= The Raft of the Medusa =

Painting by Théodore Géricault

- Le Radeau de la Méduse (French)
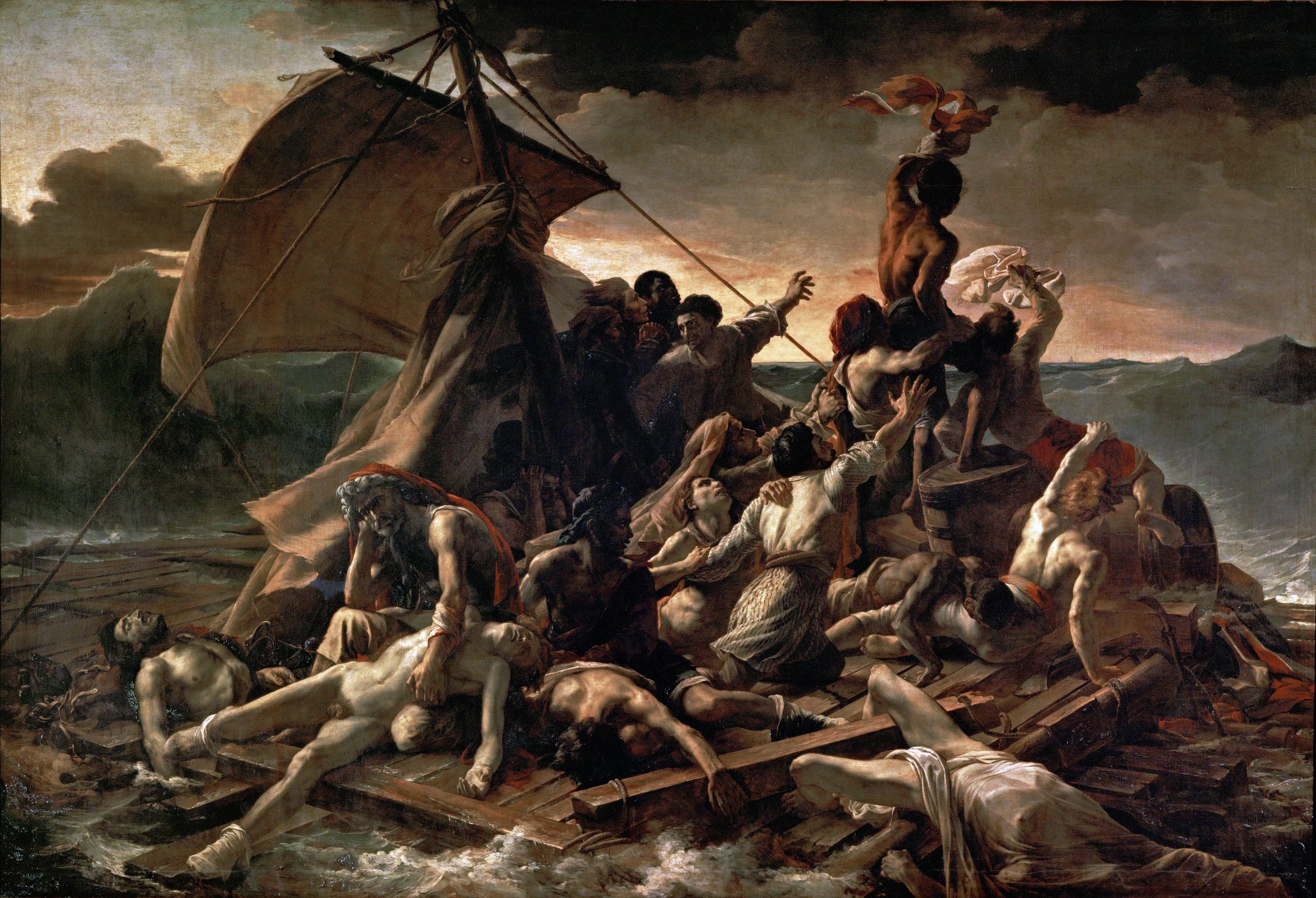
- Artist: Théodore Géricault
- Year: 1818–1819
- Medium: Oil on canvas
- Dimensions: 490 cm × 716 cm (16 ft 1 in × 23 ft 6 in)
- Location: Louvre, Paris

The Raft of the Medusa (French: Le Radeau de la Méduse [lə ʁado d(ə) la medyz])—originally titled Scène de Naufrage (Shipwreck Scene)—is an oil painting of 1818–1819 by the French Romantic painter and lithographer Théodore Géricault (1791–1824). Completed when the artist was 27, the work has become an icon of French Romanticism. At 491 by 716 cm (16 ft 1 in by 23 ft 6 in), it is an over-life-size painting that depicts a moment from the aftermath of the wreck of the French naval frigate Méduse, which ran aground off the coast of today's Mauritania on 2 July 1816. On 5 July 1816, at least 150 people were set adrift on a hurriedly constructed raft; all but 15 died in the 13 days before their rescue, and those who survived endured starvation and dehydration and practiced cannibalism. The event became an international scandal, in part because its cause was widely attributed to the incompetence of the French captain. Géricault chose this large-scale uncommissioned work to launch his career, using a subject that had already generated widespread public interest. The event fascinated him.

Théodore Géricault's social circles had close family connections with the French Navy and were directly involved in France's colonies and France's slave trade. Indeed, one of these relations, a naval officer and a slave owner, died defending France's colonial interests on the coast of west Africa in 1779 not far from the site of the Méduse shipwreck decades later.

Before Géricault began work on the final painting, he undertook extensive research and produced many preparatory sketches. He interviewed two of the survivors and constructed a detailed scale model of the raft. He visited hospitals and morgues where he could view, first-hand, the colour and texture of the flesh of the dying and dead. As he had anticipated, the painting proved highly controversial at its first appearance in the Salon of 1819, attracting passionate praise and condemnation in equal measure. However, it established his international reputation and today is widely seen as seminal in the early history of the Romantic movement in French painting.

Although The Raft of the Medusa retains elements of the traditions of history painting, in both its choice of subject matter and its dramatic presentation, it represents a break from the calm and order of the prevailing Neoclassical school. Géricault's work attracted wide attention from its first showing and was then exhibited in London. The Louvre acquired it soon after the artist's death at the age of 32. The painting's influence can be seen in the works of Eugène Delacroix, J. M. W. Turner, Gustave Courbet, and Édouard Manet.

== Background ==
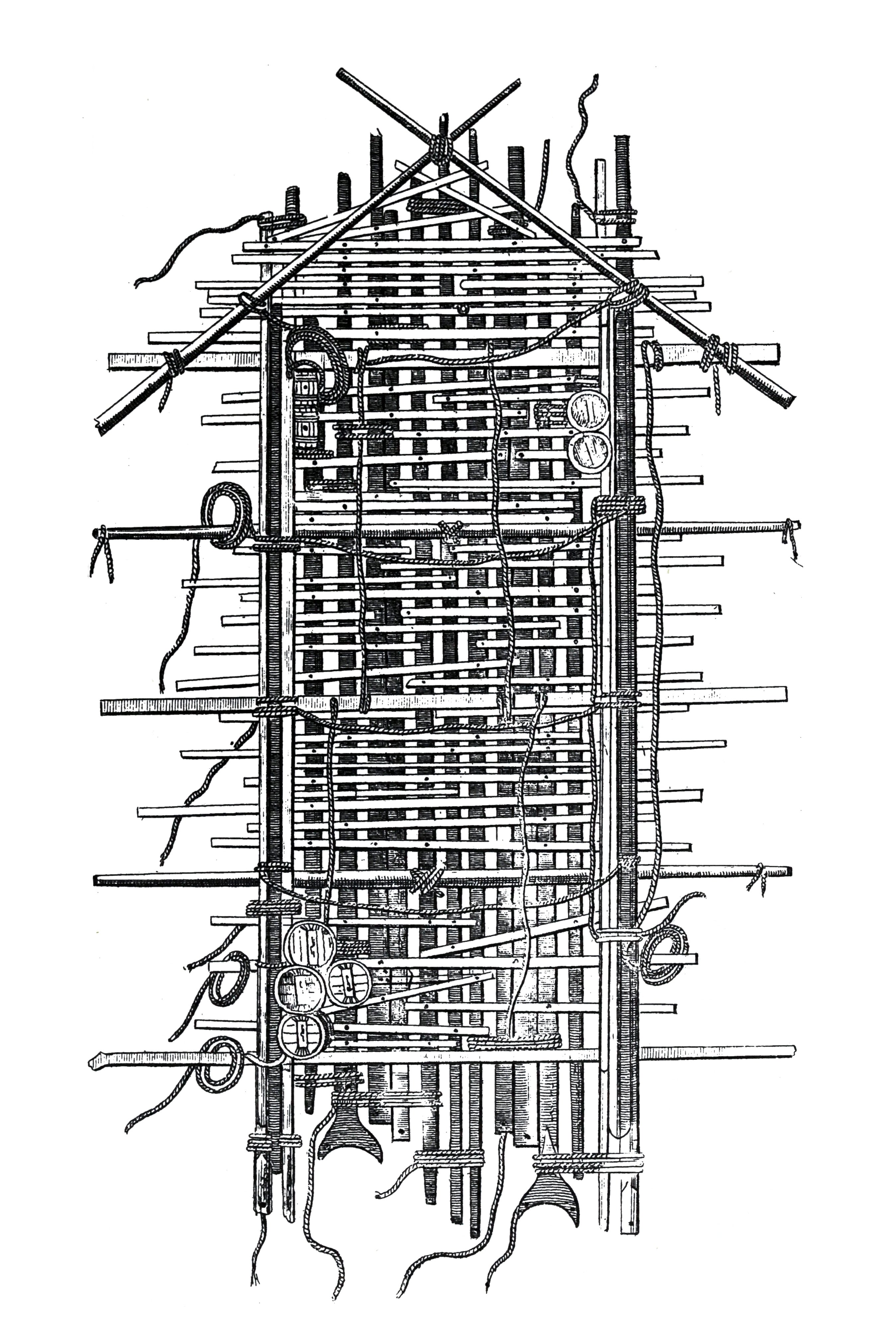
Plan of the Medusa's raft at the moment of its crew's rescue

In June 1816, the French frigate Méduse, captained by Viscount Hugues Duroy de Chaumareys, departed from Rochefort, bound for the Senegalese port of Saint-Louis. She headed a convoy of three other ships: the storeship Loire, the brig Argus and the corvette Écho. De Chaumareys, a recently returned royalist émigré, had been appointed captain of the frigate by the newly restored Bourbon administration, despite having scarcely sailed in 20 years. After the wreck, public outrage mistakenly attributed responsibility for his appointment to Louis XVIII, though this was a routine naval appointment made within the Ministry of the Navy and far outside the concerns of the monarch. The frigate's mission was to accept the British return of Senegal under the terms of France's acceptance of the Peace of Paris. The appointed French governor of Senegal, Colonel Julien-Désiré Schmaltz, and his wife and daughter were among the passengers.

In an effort to make good time, the Méduse overtook the other ships, but due to poor navigation it drifted 160 kilometres (100 mi) off course. On 2 July, it ran aground on a sandbank off the West African coast, near today's Mauritania. The collision was widely blamed on the incompetence of De Chaumareys, a returned émigré who lacked experience and ability, but had been granted his commission as a result of an act of political preferment. Efforts to free the ship failed, so, on 5 July, the frightened passengers and crew started an attempt to travel the 100 km (60 mi) to the African coast in the frigate's six boats. Although the Méduse was carrying 400 people, including 160 crew, there was space for only about 250 in the boats. The remainder of the ship's complement and half of a contingent of marine infantrymen intended to garrison Senegal—at least 146 men and one woman—were piled onto a hastily built raft, that partially submerged once it was loaded. Seventeen crew members opted to stay aboard the grounded Méduse. The captain and crew aboard the other boats intended to tow the raft, but after only a few miles the raft was turned loose. For sustenance the crew of the raft had only a bag of ship's biscuit (consumed on the first day), two casks of water (lost overboard during fighting) and six casks of wine.

According to critic Jonathan Miles, the raft carried the survivors "to the frontiers of human experience. Crazed, parched and starved, they slaughtered mutineers, ate their dead companions and killed the weakest." After 13 days, on 17 July 1816, the raft was rescued by the Argus by chance—no particular search effort was made by the French for the raft. By this time only 15 men were still alive; the others had been killed or thrown overboard by their comrades, died of starvation, or had thrown themselves into the sea in despair. The incident became a huge public embarrassment for the French monarchy, only recently restored to power after Napoleon's defeat in 1815.

== Description ==
The Raft of the Medusa portrays the moment when, after 13 days adrift on the raft, the remaining 15 survivors view a ship approaching from a distance. According to an early British reviewer, the work is set at a moment when "the ruin of the raft may be said to be complete". The painting is on a monumental scale of 491 cm × 716 cm (193 in × 282 in), so that most of the figures rendered are life-sized and those in the foreground almost twice life-size, pushed close to the picture plane and crowding onto the viewer, who is drawn into the physical action as a participant.

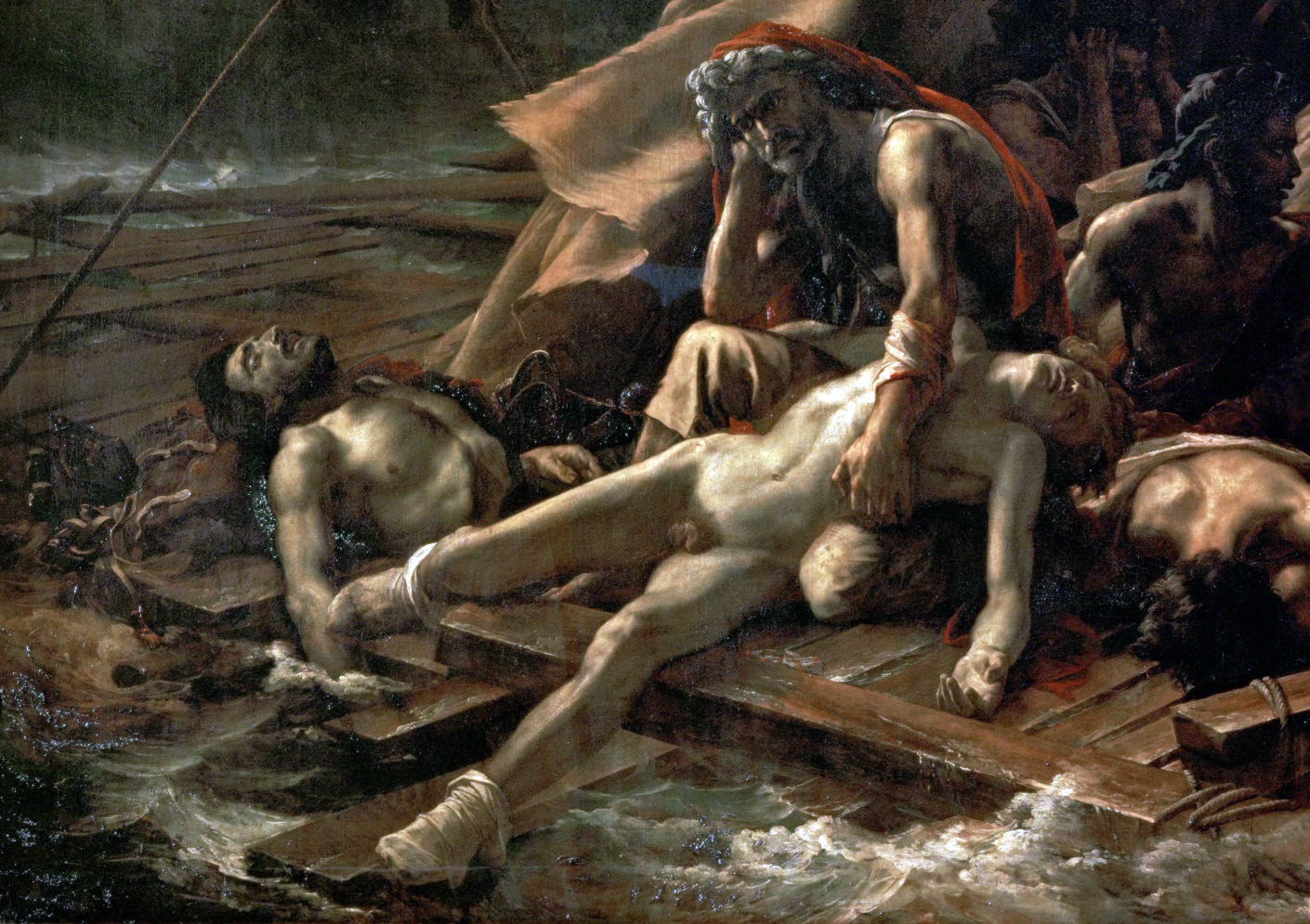
Detail from the lower left corner of the canvas showing two dying figures

The makeshift raft is shown as barely seaworthy as it rides the deep waves, while the men are rendered as broken and in utter despair. One old man holds the corpse of his son at his knees; another tears his hair out in frustration and defeat. A number of bodies litter the foreground, waiting to be swept away by the surrounding waves. The men in the middle have just viewed a rescue ship; one points it out to another, and an African crew member, Jean Charles, stands on an empty barrel and frantically waves his handkerchief to draw the ship's attention.

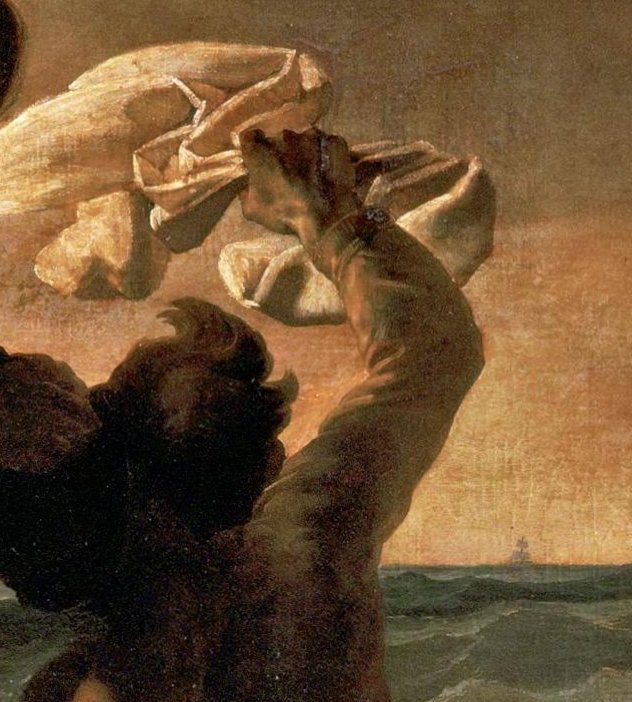
Detail of the crew member waving his handkerchief to draw the ship's attention

The pictorial composition of the painting is constructed on a pyramidal structure. The horizontal grouping of dead and dying figures in the foreground forms the base from which the survivors emerge, surging upward towards the emotional peak, where the central figure waves desperately at a rescue ship.

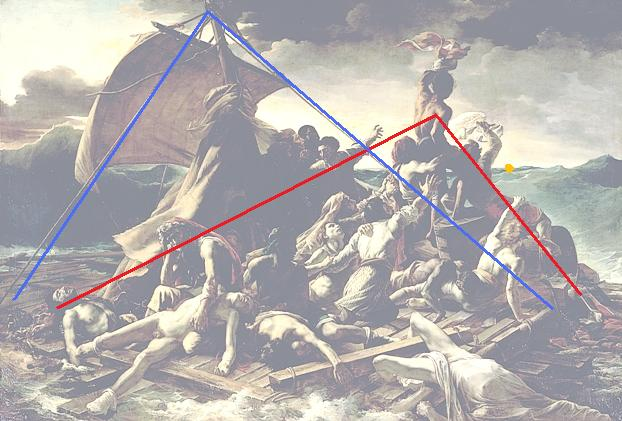
Diagram showing the outline of the two pyramidal structures that form the basis of the work. The position of the Argus rescue vessel is indicated by the yellow dot.

The viewer's attention is first drawn to the centre of the canvas, then follows the directional flow of the survivors' bodies, viewed from behind and straining to the right. According to the art historian Justin Wintle, "a single horizontal diagonal rhythm [leads] us from the dead at the bottom left, to the living at the apex." Two other diagonal lines are used to heighten the dramatic tension. One follows the mast and its rigging and leads the viewer's eye towards an approaching wave that threatens to engulf the raft, while the second, composed of reaching figures, leads to the distant silhouette of the Argus, the ship that eventually rescued the survivors.

Géricault's palette is composed of pallid flesh tones, and the murky colours of the survivors' clothes, the sea and the clouds. Overall the painting is dark and relies largely on the use of sombre, mostly brown pigments, a palette that Géricault believed was effective in suggesting tragedy and pain. The work's lighting has been described as "Caravaggesque", after the Italian artist closely associated with tenebrism—the use of violent contrast between light and dark. Even Géricault's treatment of the sea is muted, being rendered in dark greens rather than the deep blues that could have afforded contrast with the tones of the raft and its figures. From the distant area of the rescue ship, a bright light shines, providing illumination to an otherwise dull brown scene.

== Execution ==
=== Research and preparatory studies ===
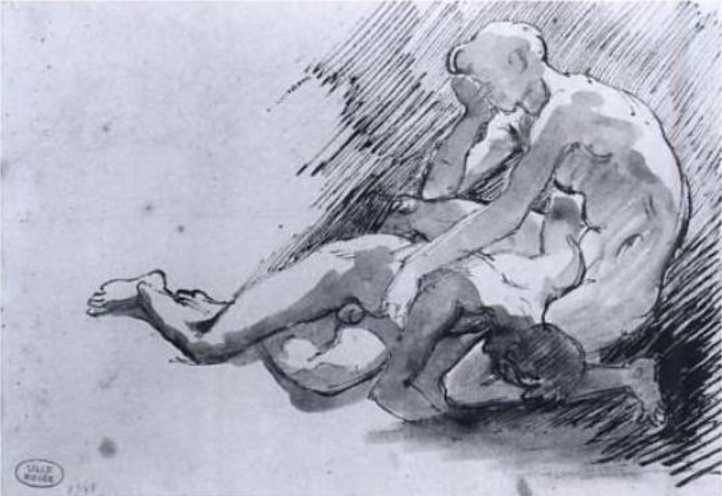
Géricault's Study for "The Raft of the Medusa", pen and brown ink, 17.6 cm × 24.5 cm, Musee des Beaux-Arts, Lille, France

Géricault was captivated by accounts of the widely publicised 1816 shipwreck, and realised that a depiction of the event might be an opportunity to establish his reputation as a painter. Having decided to proceed, he undertook extensive research before he began the painting. In early 1818, he met with two survivors: Henri Savigny, a surgeon, and Alexandre Corréard, an engineer from the École nationale supérieure d'arts et métiers. Their emotional descriptions of their experiences largely inspired the tone of the final painting. According to the art historian Georges-Antoine Borias, "Géricault established his studio across from Beaujon hospital. And here began a mournful descent. Behind locked doors he threw himself into his work. Nothing repulsed him. He was dreaded and avoided."

Earlier travels had exposed Géricault to victims of insanity and plague, and while researching the Méduse his effort to be historically accurate and realistic led to an obsession with the stiffness of corpses. To achieve the most authentic rendering of the flesh tones of the dead, he made sketches of bodies in the morgue of the Hospital Beaujon, studied the faces of dying hospital patients, brought severed limbs back to his studio to study their decay, and for a fortnight drew a severed head, borrowed from a lunatic asylum and stored on his studio roof.

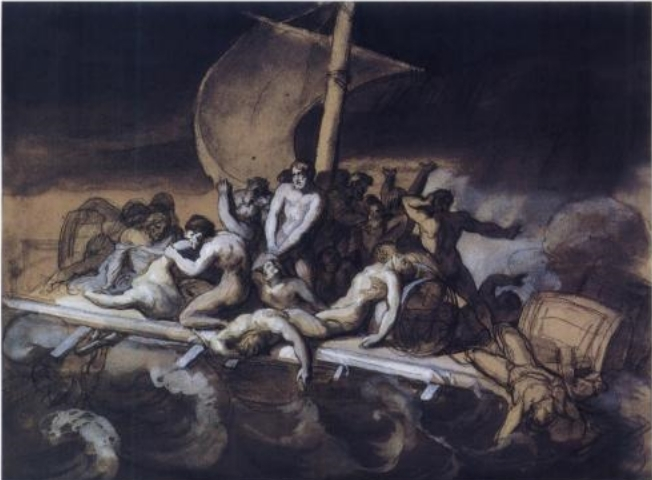
Cannibalism on the Raft of the Medusa, crayon, ink wash, and gouache on paper, 28 cm × 38 cm, Louvre. This study is darker than the final work, and the positions of the figures differ significantly from those of the later painting.

He worked with Corréard, Savigny and another of the survivors, the carpenter Lavillette, to construct an accurately detailed scale model of the raft, which was reproduced on the finished canvas, even showing the gaps between some of the planks. Géricault posed models, compiled a dossier of documentation, copied relevant paintings by other artists, and went to Le Havre to study the sea and sky. Despite suffering from fever, he travelled to the coast on a number of occasions to witness storms breaking on the shore, and a visit to artists in England afforded further opportunity to study the elements while crossing the English Channel.

He drew and painted numerous preparatory sketches while deciding which of several alternative moments of the disaster he would depict in the final work. The painting's conception proved slow and difficult for Géricault, and he struggled to select a single pictorially effective moment to best capture the inherent drama of the event.

Among the scenes he considered were the mutiny against the officers from the second day on the raft, the cannibalism that occurred after only a few days, and the rescue. Géricault ultimately settled on the moment, recounted by one of the survivors, when they first saw, on the horizon, the approaching rescue ship Argus—visible in the upper right of the painting—which they attempted to signal. The ship, however, passed by. In the words of one of the surviving crew members, "From the delirium of joy, we fell into profound despondency and grief."

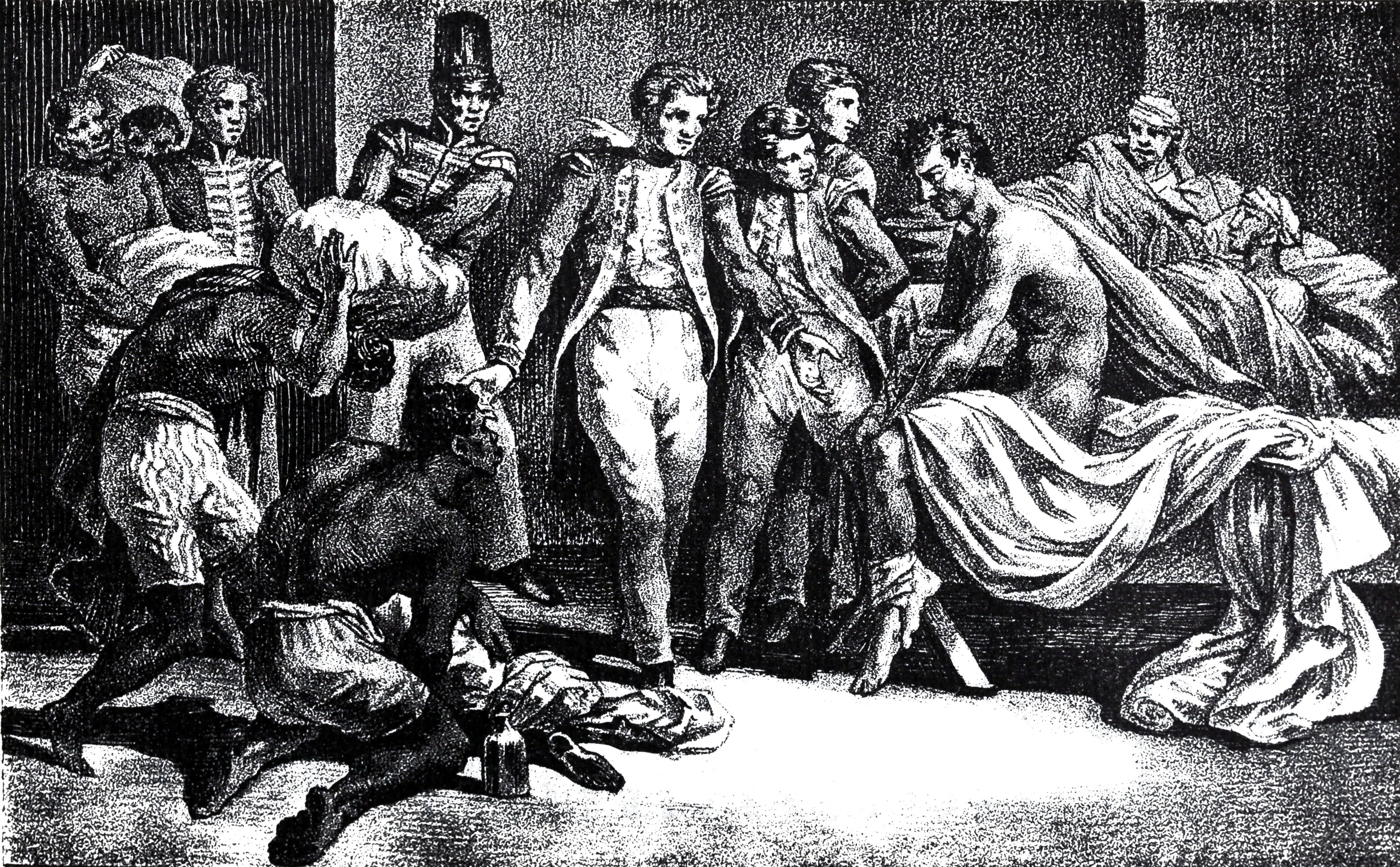
Sailors of the Méduse detained by the British after the sinking. They were returned to France afterwards. Lithograph by Charles Motte, after Théodore Géricault.

To a public well-versed in the particulars of the disaster, the scene would have been understood to encompass the aftermath of the crew's abandonment, focusing on the moment when all hope seemed lost—the Argus reappeared two hours later and rescued those who remained.

The author Rupert Christiansen points out that the painting depicts more figures than had been on the raft at the time of the rescue—including corpses which were not recorded by the rescuers. Instead of the sunny morning and calm water reported on the day of the rescue, Géricault depicted a gathering storm and dark, heaving sea to reinforce the emotional gloom.

=== Final work ===
Géricault, who had just been forced to break off a painful affair with his aunt, shaved his head and, from November 1818 to July 1819, lived a disciplined monastic existence in his studio in the Faubourg du Roule, with meals brought by his concierge and only occasional evenings out. He and his 18-year-old assistant, Louis-Alexis Jamar, slept in a small room adjacent to the studio; occasionally there were arguments and on one occasion Jamar walked off; after two days Géricault persuaded him to return. In his orderly studio, the artist worked in a methodical fashion in complete silence and found that even the noise of a mouse was sufficient to break his concentration.

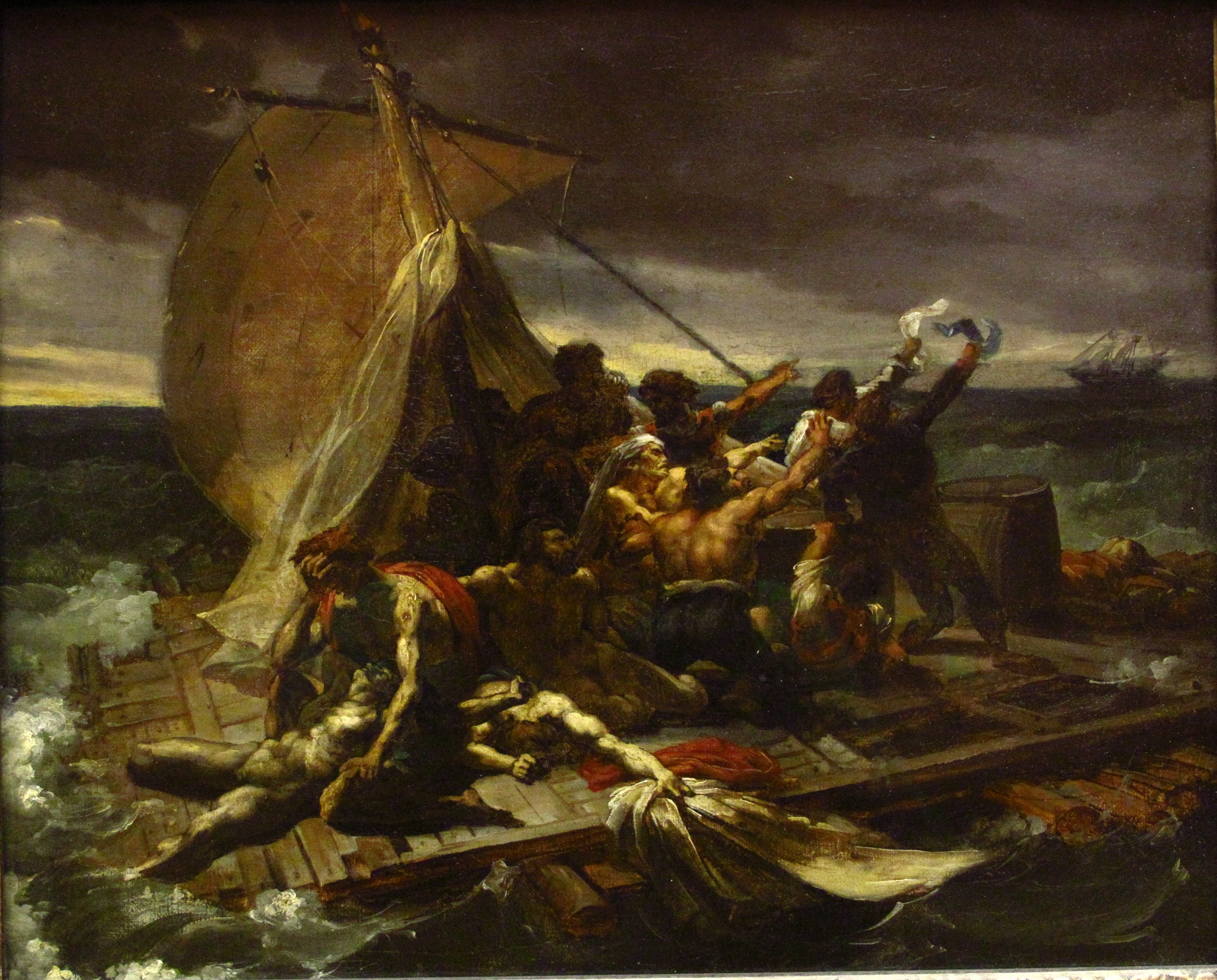
Study c. 1818–19, 38 cm × 46 cm, Louvre. This preparatory oil sketch nearly fully realises the positions of the figures in the final work.

He used friends as models, most notably the painter Eugène Delacroix, who modelled for the figure in the foreground with face turned downward and one arm outstretched. Two of the raft's survivors are seen in shadow at the foot of the mast; three of the figures were painted from life—Corréard, Savigny and Lavillette. Jamar posed nude for the dead youth shown in the foreground about to slip into the sea, and was also the model for two other figures.

Much later, Delacroix—who would become the standard-bearer of French Romanticism after Géricault's death—wrote, "Géricault allowed me to see his Raft of Medusa while he was still working on it. It made so tremendous an impression on me that when I came out of the studio I started running like a madman and did not stop till I reached my own room."

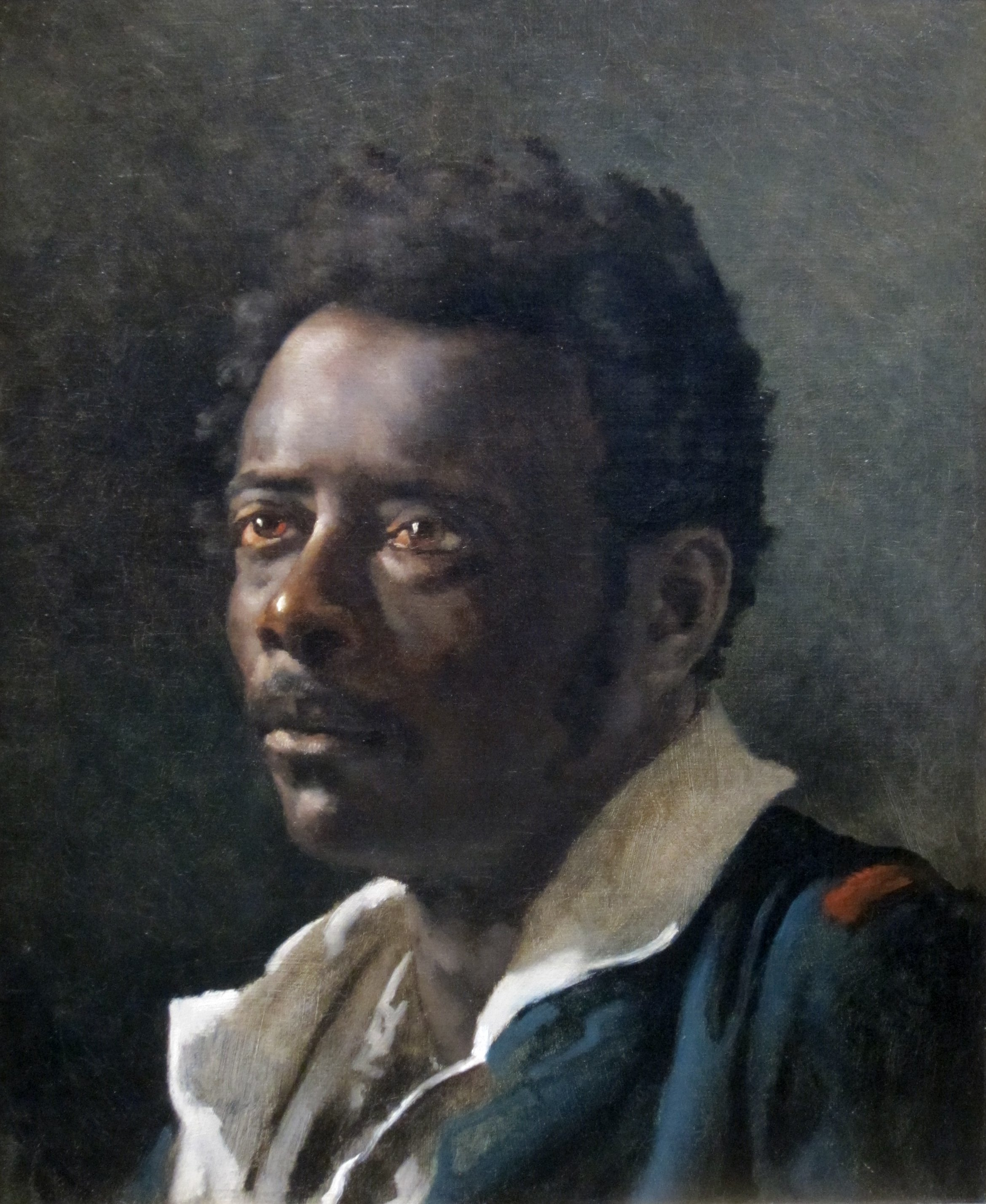
Portrait Study of Joseph, oil on canvas painting by Théodore Géricault, c. 1818–19, Getty Center. Joseph served as model for at least two Black individuals in the final version of the artist's representation of Medusa's raft.

Géricault, who was an abolitionist, hired a Haitian model named Joseph to paint at least two Black individuals on the raft. Most notably, Joseph served as a model for what is considered to be a representation of Jean Charles, a military officer waving a dark red handkerchief in hopes of being noticed by the passing ship. Influenced by an ancient Greek Classical sculpture titled Belvedere Torso and with his back turned toward the viewer, Joseph's silhouette is placed atop the pyramidal grouping of survivors in the composition's right half. In addition, a small rendering of Joseph's face, with his gaze directed toward the spectator, is placed within a group of three figures positioned between the wooden mast and the supporting rope on the mast's right-hand side.

Géricault painted with small brushes and viscous oils, which allowed little time for reworking and were dry by the next morning. He kept his colours apart from each other: his palette consisted of vermilion, white, naples yellow, two different yellow ochres, two red ochres, raw sienna, light red, burnt sienna, crimson lake, Prussian blue, peach black, ivory black, Cassel earth and bitumen. Bitumen has a velvety, lustrous appearance when first painted, but over a period of time discolours to a black treacle, while contracting and thus creating a wrinkled surface, which cannot be renovated. As a result of this, details in large areas of the work can hardly be discerned today.

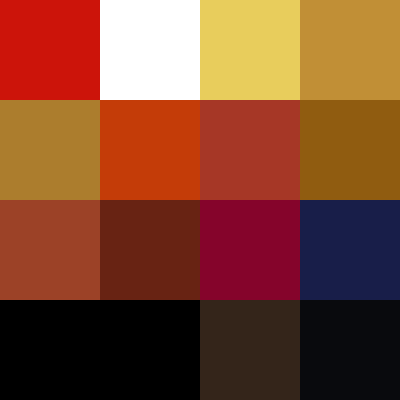
The main 16 colours used for the painting

Géricault drew an outline sketch of the composition onto the canvas. He then posed models one at a time, completing each figure before moving onto the next, as opposed to the more usual method of working over the whole composition. The concentration in this way on individual elements gave the work both a "shocking physicality" and a sense of deliberate theatricality—which some critics consider an adverse effect. Over 30 years after the completion of the work, his friend Montfort recalled:

[Géricault's method] astonished me as much as his intense industry. He painted directly on the white canvas, without rough sketch or any preparation of any sort, except for the firmly traced contours, and yet the solidity of the work was none the worse for it. I was struck by the keen attention with which he examined the model before touching brush to canvas. He seemed to proceed slowly, when in reality he executed very rapidly, placing one touch after the other in its place, rarely having to go over his work more than once. There was very little perceptible movement of his body or arms. His expression was perfectly calm ...

Working with little distraction, the artist completed the painting in eight months; the project as a whole took 18 months.

== Influences ==
The Raft of the Medusa fuses many influences from the Old Masters, from the Last Judgment (1536–1541) and Sistine Chapel ceiling (1508–1512) of Michelangelo and Raphael's Transfiguration (1516–1520), to the monumental approach of Jacques-Louis David and Antoine-Jean Gros, to contemporary events. By the 18th century, shipwrecks had become a recognised feature of marine art—as well as an increasingly common occurrence, for more journeys were made by sea. Claude Joseph Vernet created many such images in the 1700s, achieving naturalistic colour through direct observation—unlike other artists at that time—and was said to have tied himself to the mast of a ship in order to witness a storm.

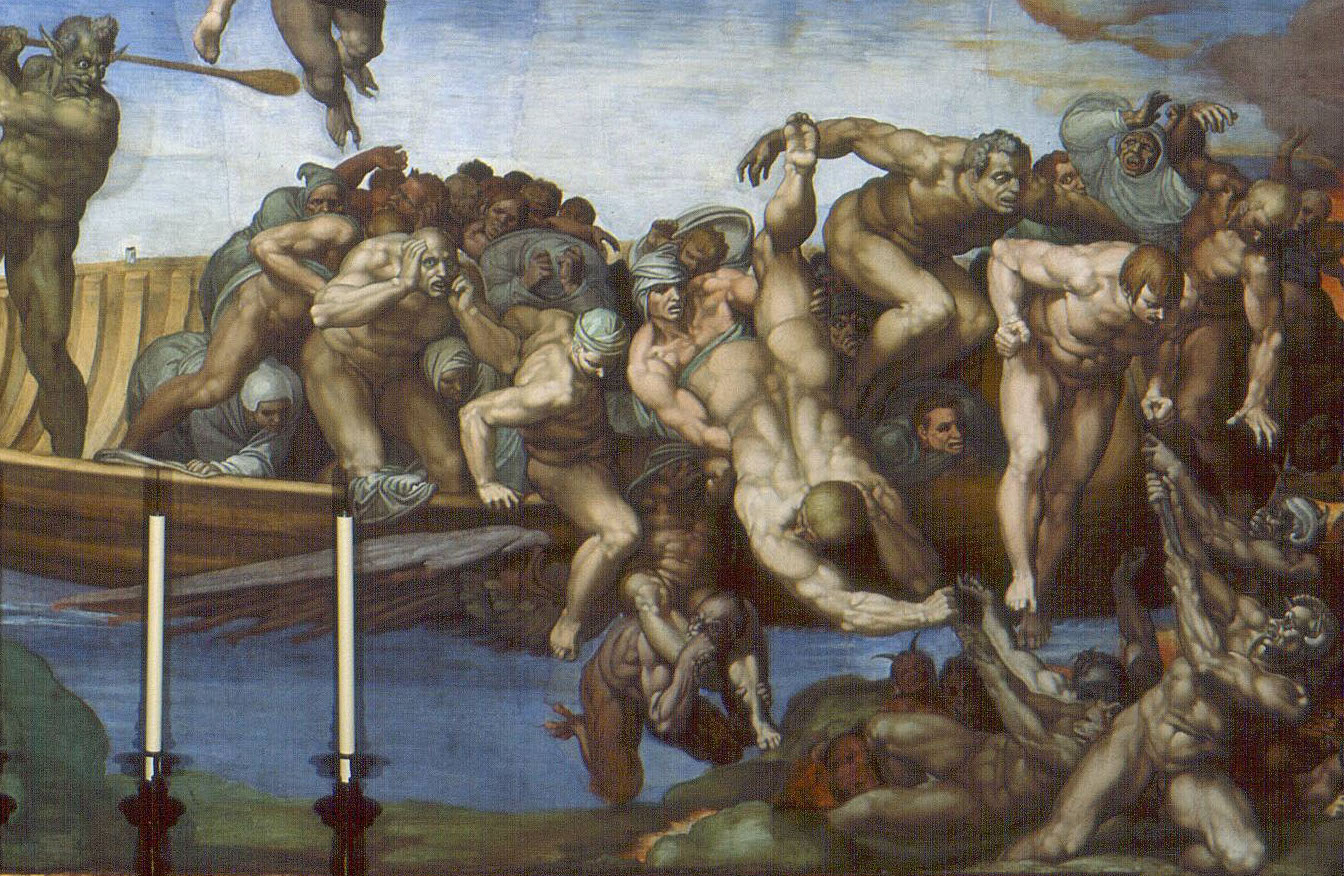
Michelangelo. Detail of The Last Judgment in the Sistine Chapel. Géricault said, "Michelangelo sent shivers up my spine, these lost souls destroying each other inevitably conjure up the tragic grandeur of the Sistine Chapel."

Although the men depicted on the raft had spent 13 days adrift and suffered hunger, disease and cannibalism, Géricault pays tribute to the traditions of heroic painting and presents his figures as muscular and healthy. According to the art historian Richard Muther, there is still a strong debt to Classicism in the work. The fact that the majority of the figures are almost naked, he wrote, arose from a desire to avoid "unpictorial" costumes. Muther observes that there is "still something academic in the figures, which do not seem to be sufficiently weakened by privation, disease, and the struggle with death".

The influence of Jacques-Louis David can be seen in the painting's scale, in the sculptural tautness of the figures and in the heightened manner in which a particularly significant "fruitful moment"—the first awareness of the approaching ship—is described. In 1793, David also painted an important current event with The Death of Marat. His painting had an enormous political impact during the revolution in France, and it served as an important precedent for Géricault's decision to paint a contemporary event as well. David's pupil, Antoine-Jean Gros, had, like David, represented "the grandiosities of a school irredeemably associated with a lost cause", but in some major works, he had given equal prominence to Napoleon and anonymous dead or dying figures. Géricault had been particularly impressed by the 1804 painting Bonaparte Visiting the Plague-Victims of Jaffa, by Gros.

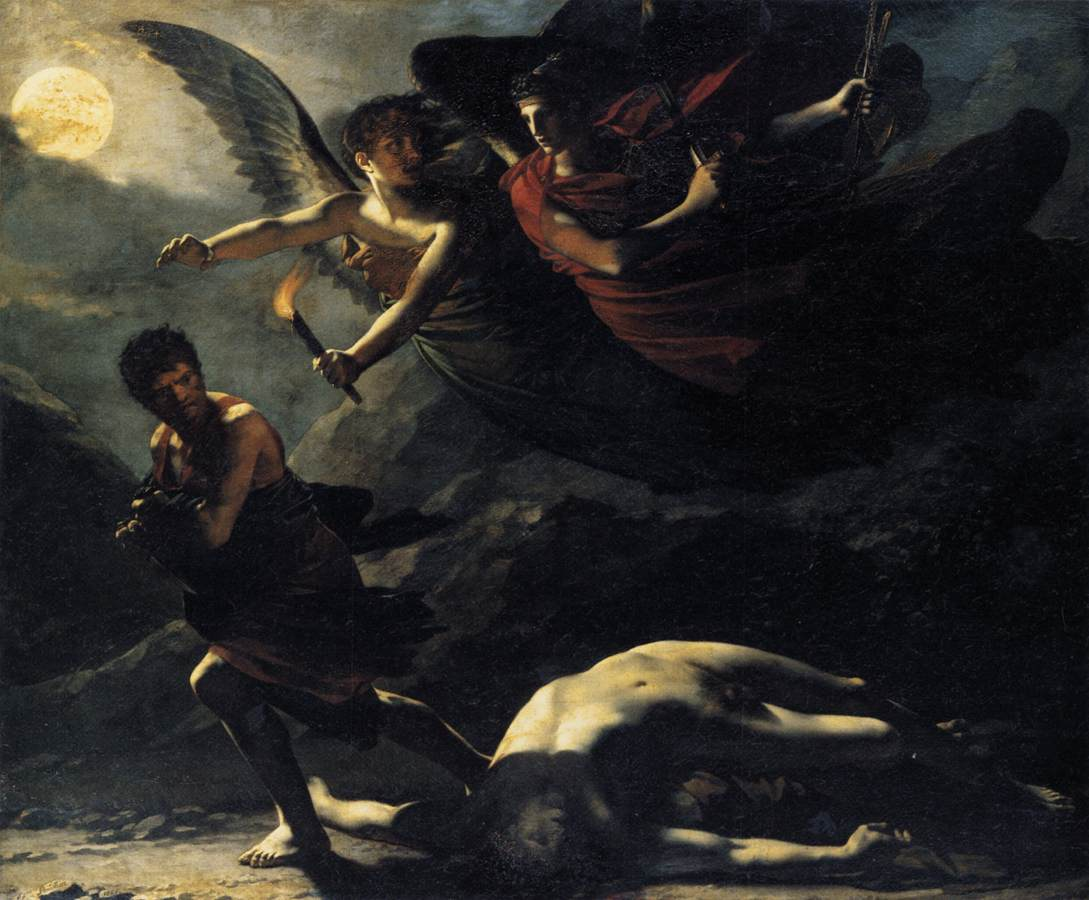
Pierre-Paul Prud'hon. Justice and Divine Vengeance Pursuing Crime, 1808, 244 cm × 294 cm, J. Paul Getty Museum, Getty Center, Los Angeles. The darkness and the sprawling naked figure were an influence on Géricault's painting.

The young Géricault had painted copies of work by Pierre-Paul Prud'hon, whose "thunderously tragic pictures" include his masterpiece, Justice and Divine Vengeance Pursuing Crime, where oppressive darkness and the compositional base of a naked, sprawled corpse obviously influenced Géricault's painting.

The foreground figure of the older man may be a reference to Ugolino from Dante's Inferno—a subject that Géricault had contemplated painting—and seems to borrow from an 1806 painting of Ugolini by Henry Fuseli that Géricault may have known from prints. In Dante, Ugolino is guilty of cannibalism, which was one of the most sensational aspects of the days on the raft. Géricault seems to allude to this through the borrowing from Fuseli. An early study for The Raft of the Medusa in watercolour, now in the Louvre, is much more explicit, depicting a figure gnawing on the arm of a headless corpse.

Several English and American paintings, including The Death of Major Pierson (1783) by John Singleton Copley—also painted within two years of the event—had established a precedent for a contemporary subject. Copley had also painted several large and heroic depictions of disasters at sea which Géricault may have known from prints: Watson and the Shark (1778), in which a black man is central to the action, and which, like The Raft of the Medusa, concentrated on the actors of the drama rather than the seascape; The Defeat of the Floating Batteries at Gibraltar, September 1782 (1791), which was an influence on both the style and subject matter of Géricault's work; and Scene of a Shipwreck (1790s), which has a strikingly similar composition. A further important precedent for the political component was the works of Francisco Goya, particularly his The Disasters of War series of 1810–12, and his 1814 masterpiece The Third of May 1808. Goya also produced a painting of a disaster at sea, called simply Shipwreck (date unknown), but although the sentiment is similar, the composition and style have nothing in common with The Raft of the Medusa. It is unlikely that Géricault had seen the picture.

== Exhibition and reception ==
The Raft of the Medusa was first shown at the 1819 Paris Salon, under the title Scène de Naufrage (Shipwreck Scene), although its real subject would have been unmistakable for contemporary viewers. The exhibition was sponsored by Louis XVIII and featured nearly 1,300 paintings, 208 sculptures and numerous other engravings and architectural designs. Géricault's canvas was the star at the exhibition: "It strikes and attracts all eyes" (Le Journal de Paris). Louis XVIII visited three days before the opening and reportedly said: "Monsieur, vous venez de faire un naufrage qui n'en est pas un pour vous", freely translated as "Monsieur Géricault, your shipwreck is certainly no disaster". The critics were divided: the horror and "terribilità" of the subject exercised fascination, but devotees of classicism expressed their distaste for what they described as a "pile of corpses", whose realism they considered a far cry from the "ideal beauty" represented by Girodet's Pygmalion and Galatea, which triumphed the same year. Géricault's work expressed a paradox: how could a hideous subject be rendered as a powerful painting, and how could the painter reconcile art and reality? Marie-Philippe Coupin de la Couperie, a French painter and contemporary of Géricault, provided one answer: "Monsieur Géricault seems mistaken. The goal of painting is to speak to the soul and the eyes, not to repel." The painting had fervent admirers too, including French writer and art critic Auguste Jal, who praised its political theme, its liberal position—its advancement of the negro and critique of ultra-royalism—and its modernity. The historian Jules Michelet approved: "our whole society is aboard the raft of the Medusa".

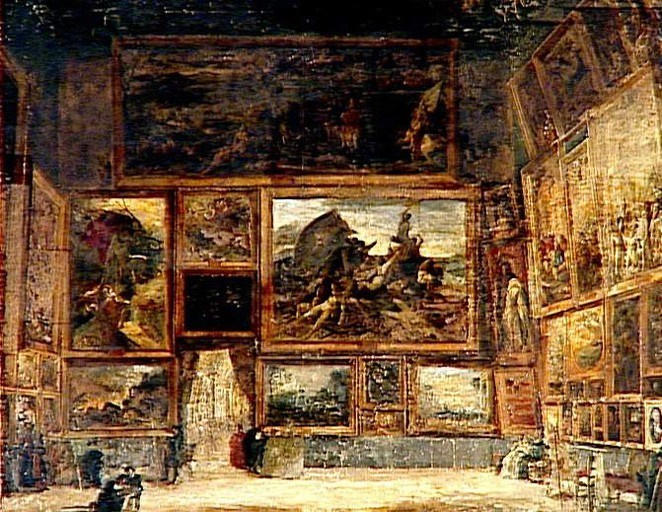
Nicolas Sebastien Maillot's Raft of the Medusa shown in Salon Carré of the Louvre, 1831, Louvre, shows Géricault's Raft hanging alongside works by Poussin, Lorrain, Rembrandt and Caravaggio.

Géricault had deliberately sought to be both politically and artistically confrontational. Critics responded to his aggressive approach in kind, and their reactions were either ones of revulsion or praise, depending on whether the writer's sympathies favoured the Bourbon or Liberal viewpoint. The painting was seen as largely sympathetic to the men on the raft, and thus by extension to the anti-imperial cause adopted by the survivors Savigny and Corréard. The decision to place a black man at the pinnacle of the composition was a controversial expression of Géricault's abolitionist sympathies. The art critic Christine Riding has speculated that the painting's later exhibition in London was planned to coincide with anti-slavery agitation there. According to art critic and curator Karen Wilkin, Géricault's painting acts as a "cynical indictment of the bungling malfeasance of France's post-Napoleonic officialdom, much of which was recruited from the surviving families of the Ancien Régime".

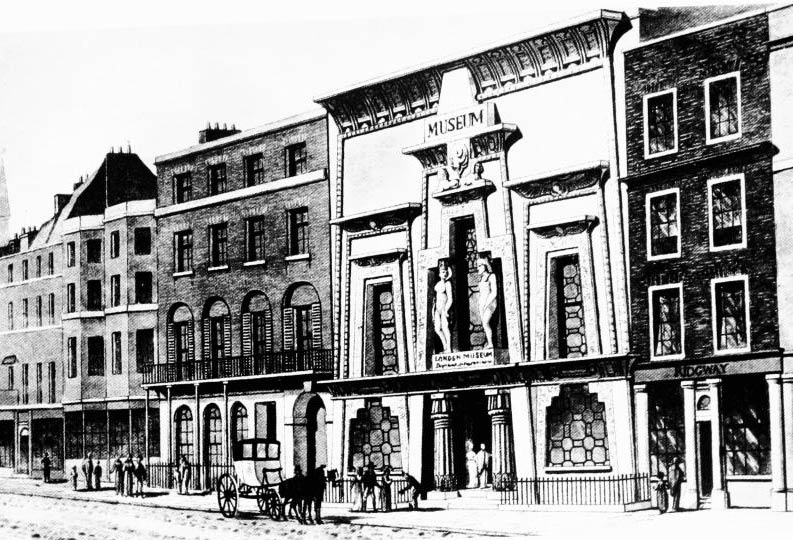
In 1820, Géricault successfully exhibited the painting in the Egyptian Hall in Piccadilly, London.

The painting generally impressed the viewing public, although its subject matter repelled many, thus denying Géricault the popular acclaim which he had hoped to achieve. At the end of the exhibition, the painting was awarded a gold medal by the judging panel, but they did not give the work the greater prestige of selecting it for the Louvre's national collection. Instead, Géricault was awarded a commission on the subject of the Sacred Heart of Jesus, which he clandestinely offered to Delacroix, whose finished painting he then signed as his own. Géricault retreated to the countryside, where he collapsed from exhaustion, and his unsold work was rolled up and stored in a friend's studio.

Géricault arranged for the painting to be exhibited in London in 1820, where it was shown at William Bullock's Egyptian Hall in Piccadilly, London, from 10 June until the end of the year, and viewed by about 40,000 visitors. During this time, it also upstaged Christ's Entry into Jerusalem by Benjamin Haydon. The reception in London was more positive than that in Paris, and the painting was hailed as representative of a new direction in French art. It received more positive reviews than when it was shown at the Salon. In part, this was due to the manner of the painting's exhibition: in Paris it had initially been hung high in the Salon Carré—a mistake that Géricault recognised when he saw the work installed—but in London it was placed close to the ground, emphasising its monumental impact. There may have been other reasons for its popularity in England as well, including "a degree of national self-congratulation", the appeal of the painting as lurid entertainment, and two theatrical entertainments based around the events on the raft which coincided with the exhibition and borrowed heavily from Géricault's depiction. From the London exhibition Géricault earned close to 20,000 francs, which was his share of the fees charged to visitors, and substantially more than he would have been paid had the French government purchased the work from him. After the London exhibition, Bullock brought the painting to Dublin early in 1821, but the exhibition there was far less successful, in large part due to a competing exhibition of a moving panorama, "The Wreck of the Medusa" by the Marshall brothers firm, which was said to have been painted under the direction of one of the survivors of the disaster.

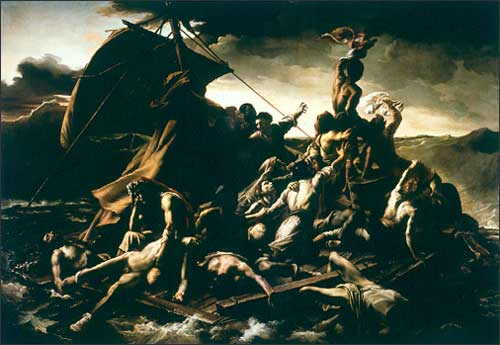
Copy of the work by Pierre-Désiré Guillemet and Étienne-Antoine-Eugène Ronjat, a full-size copy, 1859–60, 493 cm × 717 cm, Musée de Picardie, Amiens

The Raft of the Medusa was championed by the curator of the Louvre, comte de Forbin who purchased it for the museum from Géricault's heirs after his death in 1824. The painting now dominates its gallery there. The display caption tells us that "the only hero in this poignant story is humanity".

At some time between 1826 and 1830 American artist George Cooke made a copy of the painting in a smaller size, (130.5 cm × 196.2 cm; 4.28 ft × 6.44 ft), which was shown in Boston, Philadelphia, New York and Washington, D.C. to crowds who knew about the controversy surrounding the shipwreck. Reviews favoured the painting, which also stimulated plays, poems, performances and a children's book. It was bought by a former admiral, Uriah Phillips, who left it in 1862 to the New York Historical Society, where it was miscatalogued as by Gilbert Stuart and remained inaccessible until the mistake was uncovered in 2006, after an enquiry by Nina Athanassoglou-Kallmyer, a professor of art history at the University of Delaware. The university's conservation department undertook restoration of the work.

Because of deterioration in the condition of Géricault's original, the Louvre in 1859–60 commissioned two French artists, Pierre-Désiré Guillemet and Étienne-Antoine-Eugène Ronjat, to make a full-size copy of the original for loan exhibitions.

In the autumn of 1939, the Medusa was packed for removal from the Louvre in anticipation of the outbreak of war. A scenery truck from the Comédie-Française transported the painting to Versailles on the night of 3 September. Some time later, the Medusa was moved to the Château de Chambord where it remained until after the end of the Second World War.

== Interpretation and legacy ==
In its insistence on portraying an unpleasant truth, The Raft of the Medusa was a landmark in the emerging Romantic movement in French painting, and "laid the foundations of an aesthetic revolution" against the prevailing Neoclassical style. Géricault's compositional structure and depiction of the figures are classical, but the subject's contrasting turbulence represents a significant shift in artistic direction and creates an important bridge between Neoclassical and Romantic styles. By 1815, Jacques-Louis David, then in exile in Brussels, was both the leading proponent of the popular history painting genre, which he had perfected, and a master of the Neoclassical style. In France, both history painting and the Neoclassical style continued through the work of Antoine-Jean Gros, Jean Auguste Dominique Ingres, François Gérard, Anne-Louis Girodet de Roussy-Trioson, Pierre-Narcisse Guérin—teacher of both Géricault and Delacroix—and other artists who remained committed to the artistic traditions of David and Nicolas Poussin.

In his introduction to The Journal of Eugène Delacroix, Hubert Wellington wrote about Delacroix's opinion of the state of French painting just prior to the Salon of 1819. According to Wellington, "The curious blend of classic with realistic outlook which had been imposed by the discipline of David was now losing both animation and interest. The master himself was nearing his end, and exiled in Belgium. His most docile pupil, Girodet, a refined and cultivated classicist, was producing pictures of astonishing frigidity. Gérard, immensely successful painter of portraits under the Empire—some of them admirable—fell in with the new vogue for large pictures of history, but without enthusiasm."

The Raft of the Medusa contains the gestures and grand scale of traditional history painting; however, it presents ordinary people, rather than heroes, reacting to the unfolding drama. Géricault's raft pointedly lacks a hero, and his painting presents no cause beyond sheer survival. The work represents, in the words of Christine Riding, "the fallacy of hope and pointless suffering, and at worst, the basic human instinct to survive, which had superseded all moral considerations and plunged civilised man into barbarism".

The artist's abolitionist views are said to have been expressed in his decision to prominently feature at least two Black individuals, particularly the dominant figure seen waving a dark red handkerchief. According to scholars Klaus Berger and Diane Chalmers Johnson, Géricault made "him the focal point of the drama, the strongest and most perceptive of the survivors, in a sense, the 'hero of the scene.'" They argue that the artist's choice to do so was not a "last-minute" decision as evidenced by early sketches for the work, including a portrait study of the Haitian model Joseph, and point to Géricault's concerns regarding the "extreme cruelties" of illegal slave trade in the French colonies. Depicting a Black figure as a hero to convey an abolitionist message was uncommon at the time, as the official symbol of the French abolitionist group, the Société des amis des Noirs, was an emblem, originally created by Josiah Wedgewood, titled “Am I Not a Man and a Brother?” (or “Ne suis-je pas ton frere?”) that depicts a Black man begging on one knee for liberation. Scholar Susan Libby highlights how this trope of a helpless, subservient slave became commonplace in European art. Gericault's choice to place the Black man as the active “hero” deviated from popular ideas about enslaved people. The subject of marine tragedy was undertaken by J. M. W. Turner, who, like many English artists, probably saw Géricault's painting when it was exhibited in London in 1820. His A Disaster at Sea (c. 1835) chronicled a similar incident, this time a British catastrophe, with a swamped vessel and dying figures also placed in the foreground. Placing a person of color in the centre of the drama was revisited by Turner, with similar abolitionist overtones, in his The Slave Ship (1840).

The unblemished musculature of the central figure waving to the rescue ship is reminiscent of the Neoclassical; however, the naturalism of light and shadow, the authenticity of the survivors' desperation, and the emotional character of the composition set it apart from Neoclassical austerity. It was a further departure from the religious or classical themes of earlier works, as it depicted contemporary events featuring ordinary, unheroic figures. Both the choice of subject matter and the heightened manner in which the dramatic moment is depicted are typical of Romantic painting—strong indications of the extent to which Géricault had moved from the prevalent Neoclassical movement.

Hubert Wellington said that while Delacroix was a lifelong admirer of Gros, the dominating enthusiasm of his youth was for Géricault. The dramatic composition of Géricault, with its strong contrasts of tone and unconventional gestures, stimulated Delacroix to trust his own creative impulses on a large work. Delacroix said, "Géricault allowed me to see his Raft of Medusa while he was still working on it." The painting's influence is seen in Delacroix's The Barque of Dante (1822) and reappears as inspiration in Delacroix's later works, such as The Shipwreck of Don Juan (1840). According to Wellington, Delacroix's masterpiece of 1830, Liberty Leading the People, springs directly from Géricault's The Raft of the Medusa and Delacroix's own The Massacre at Chios. Wellington wrote that "While Géricault carried his interest in actual detail to the point of searching for more survivors from the wreck as models, Delacroix felt his composition more vividly as a whole, thought of his figures and crowds as types, and dominated them by the symbolic figure of Republican Liberty which is one of his finest plastic inventions."

The art historian Albert Elsen believed that The Raft of the Medusa and Delacroix's Massacre at Chios inspired the grandiose sweep of Auguste Rodin's monumental sculpture The Gates of Hell. He wrote that "Delacroix's Massacre at Chios and Géricault's Raft of the Medusa confronted Rodin on a heroic scale with the innocent nameless victims of political tragedies ... If Rodin was inspired to rival Michelangelo's Last Judgment, he had Géricault's Raft of the Medusa in front of him for encouragement." Kenneth Clark described the painting is the "chief example of romantic pathos expressed through the nude; and that obsession with death, which drove Géricault to frequent mortuary chambers and places of public execution, gives truth to his figures of the dead and the dying. Their outlines may be taken from the classics, but they have been seen again with a craving for violent experience."

While Gustave Courbet could be described as an anti-Romantic painter, his major works like A Burial at Ornans (1849–1850) and The Artist's Studio (1855) owe a debt to The Raft of the Medusa. The influence is not only in Courbet's enormous scale, but in his willingness to portray ordinary people and current political events, and to record people, places and events in real, everyday surroundings. The 2004 exhibition at the Clark Art Institute, Bonjour Monsieur Courbet: The Bruyas Collection from the Musee Fabre, Montpellier, sought to compare the 19th-century Realist painters Courbet, Honoré Daumier, and early Édouard Manet with artists associated with Romanticism, including Géricault and Delacroix. Citing The Raft of the Medusa as an instrumental influence on Realism, the exhibition drew comparisons between all of the artists. The critic Michael Fried sees Manet directly borrowing the figure of the man cradling his son for the composition of Angels at the Tomb of Christ.

In contemporary art historical discourse, artist Luc Tuymans has referenced The Raft of the Medusa as an influence, noting its impact on his approach to composition and the representation of historical imagery.

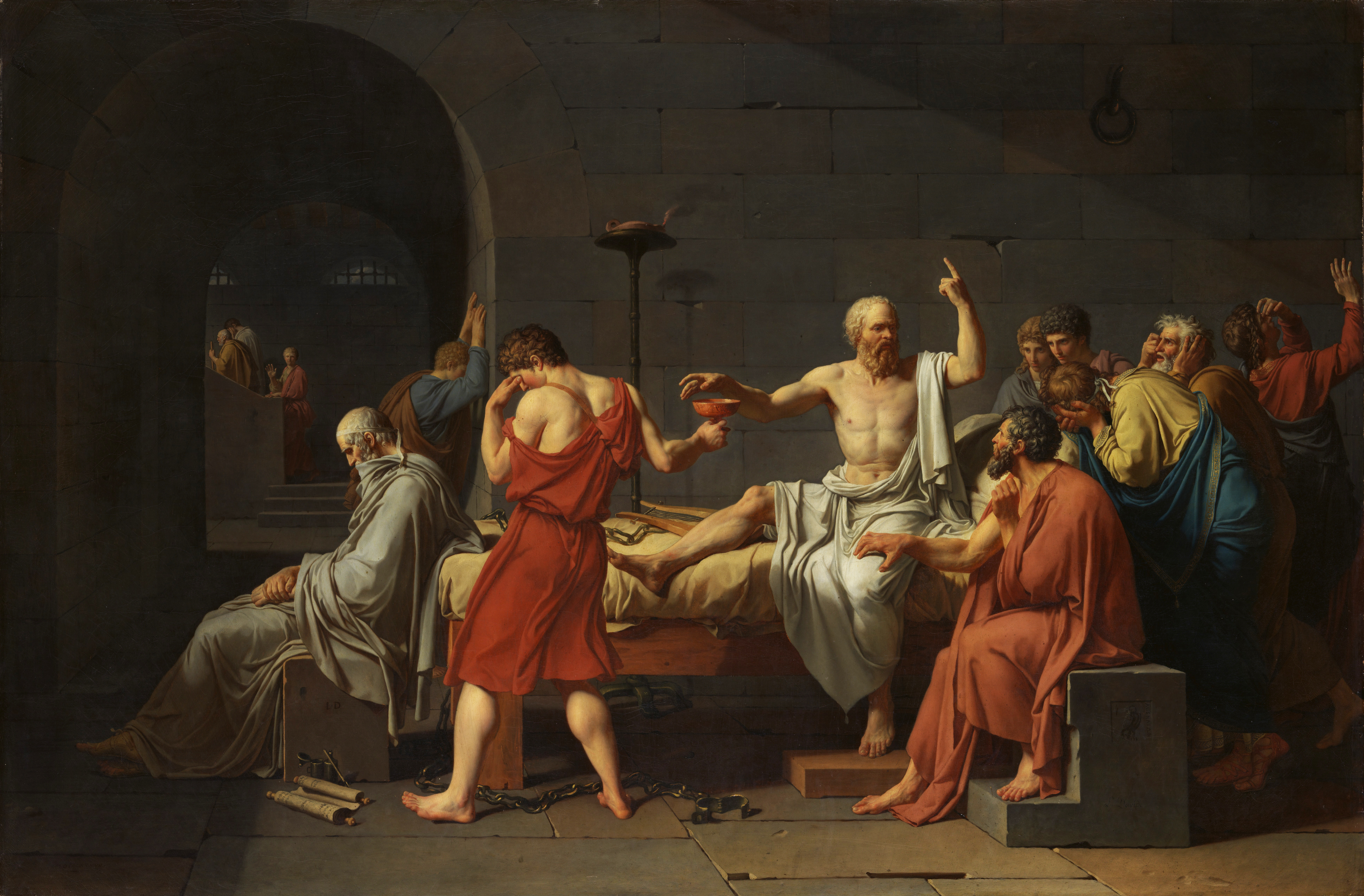
Jacques-Louis David, The Death of Socrates 1787, 129.5 cm × 196.2 cm, Metropolitan Museum of Art. David represented the Neoclassical style, from which Géricault sought to break.

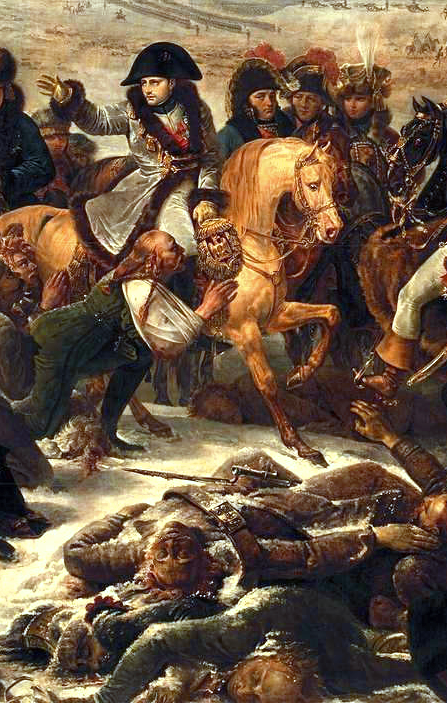
Antoine-Jean Gros, detail from Napoleon on the battlefield of Eylau, 1807, Louvre. Like Gros, Géricault had seen and felt the exhilaration of violence, and was distraught by the human consequences.

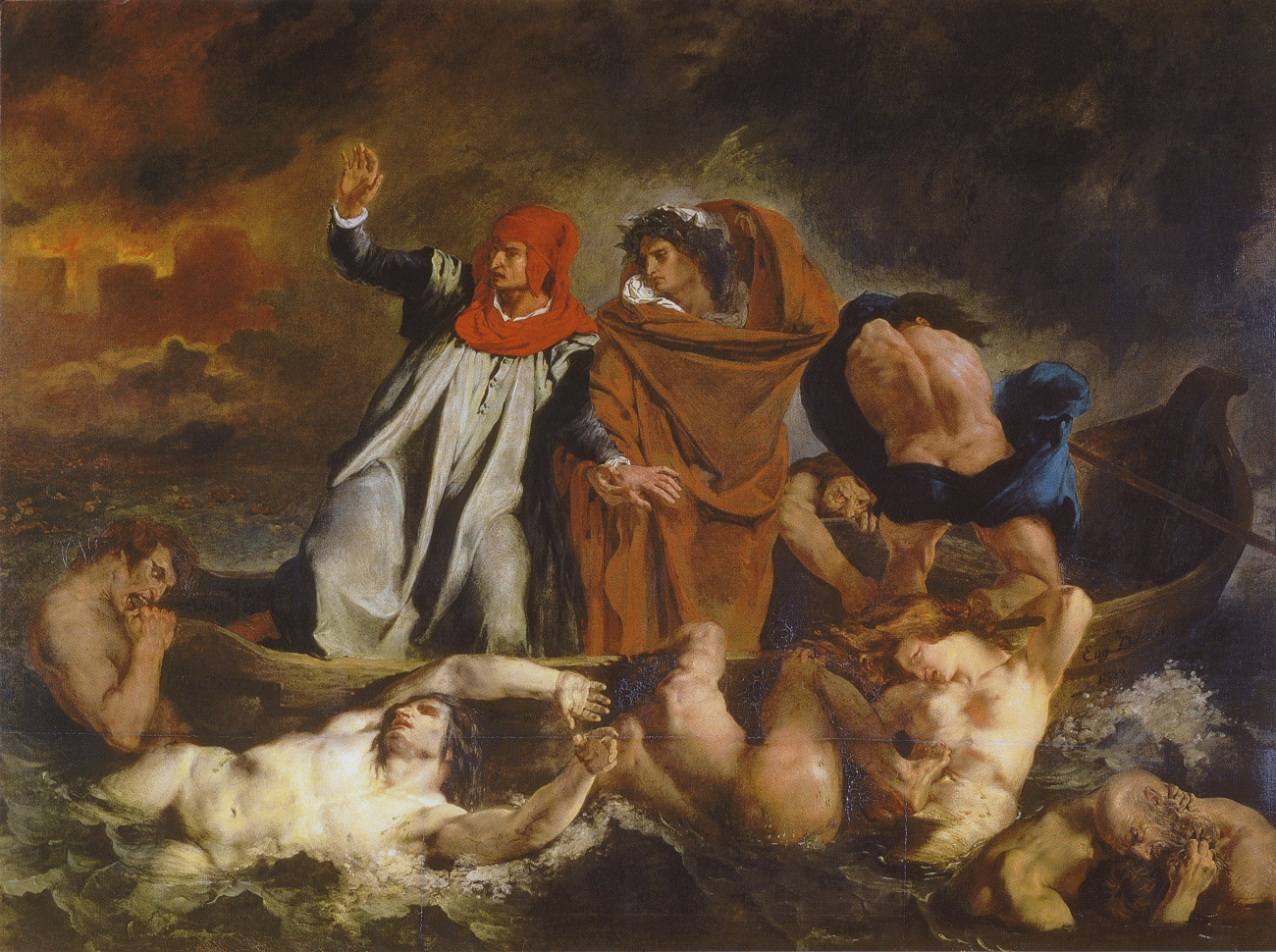
Eugène Delacroix, The Barque of Dante, 1822. The Raft of the Medusa's influence on the work of the young Delacroix was immediately apparent in this painting, as well as in later works.

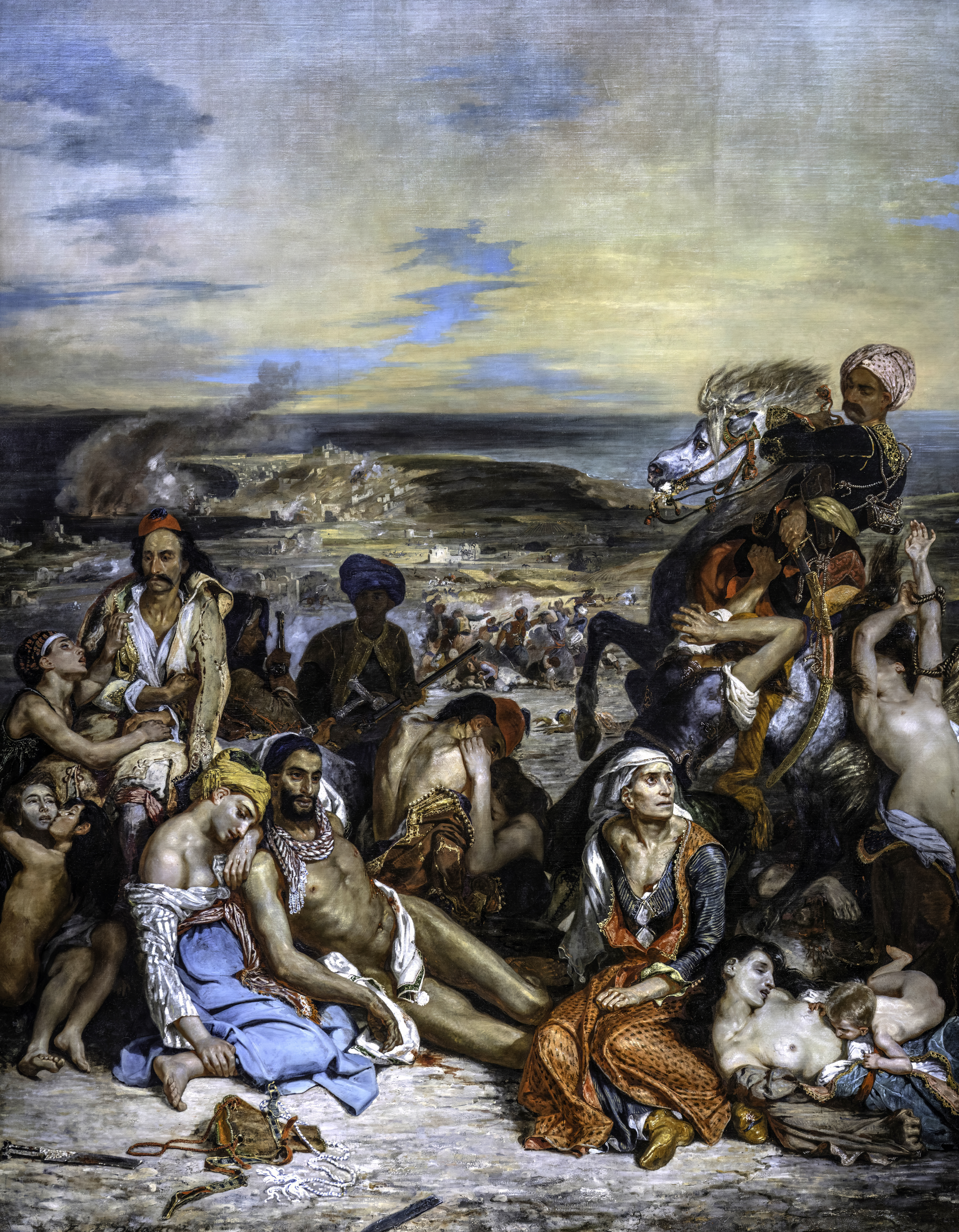
Eugène Delacroix, Massacre at Chios, 1824, 419 cm × 354 cm, Louvre. This painting springs directly from Géricault's The Raft of the Medusa and was painted in 1824, the year Géricault died.

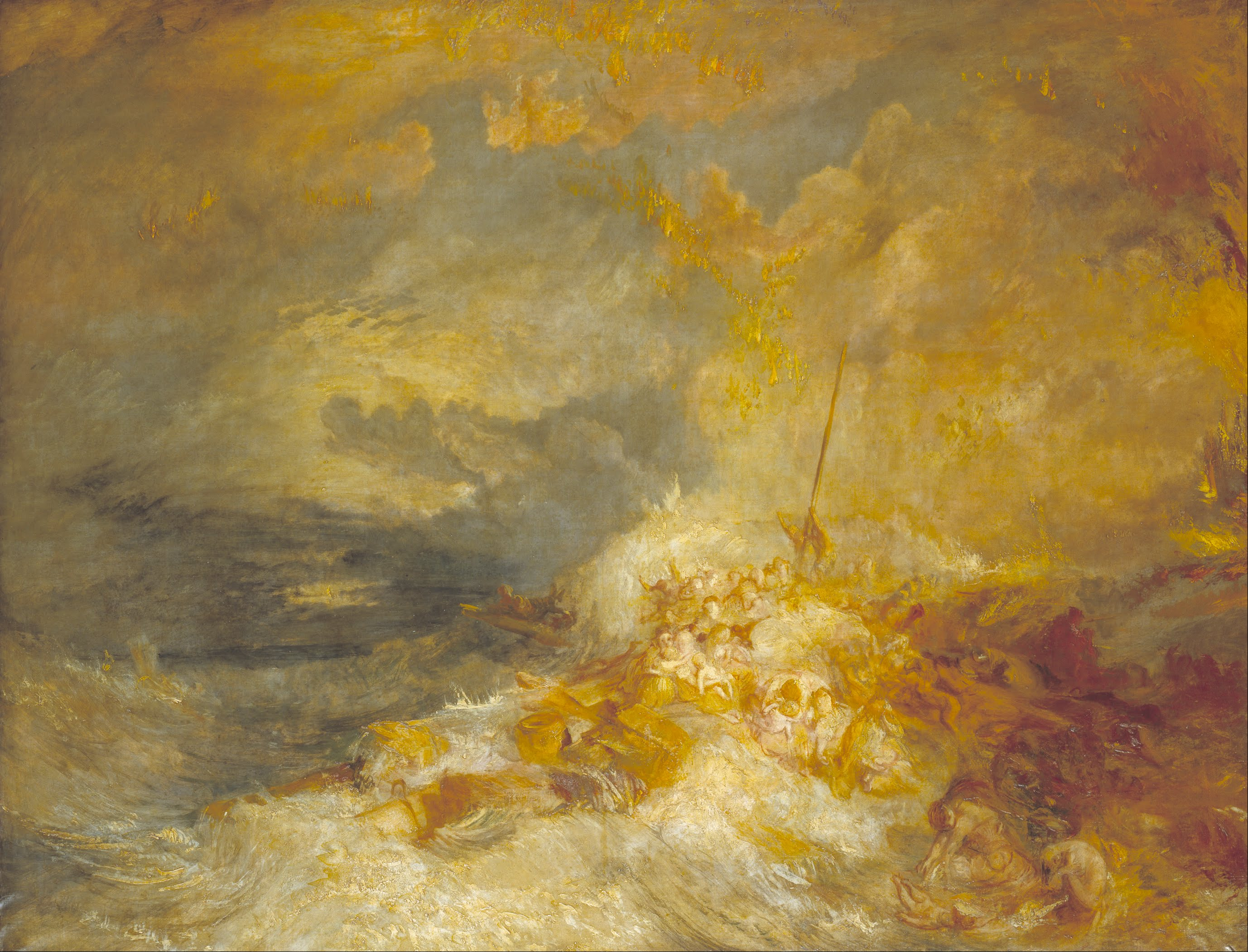
J. M. W. Turner, A Disaster at Sea (also known as The Wreck of the Amphitrite), c. 1833–35, 171.5 cm × 220.5 cm, Tate, London. Turner probably saw Géricault's painting when it was exhibited in London in 1820.

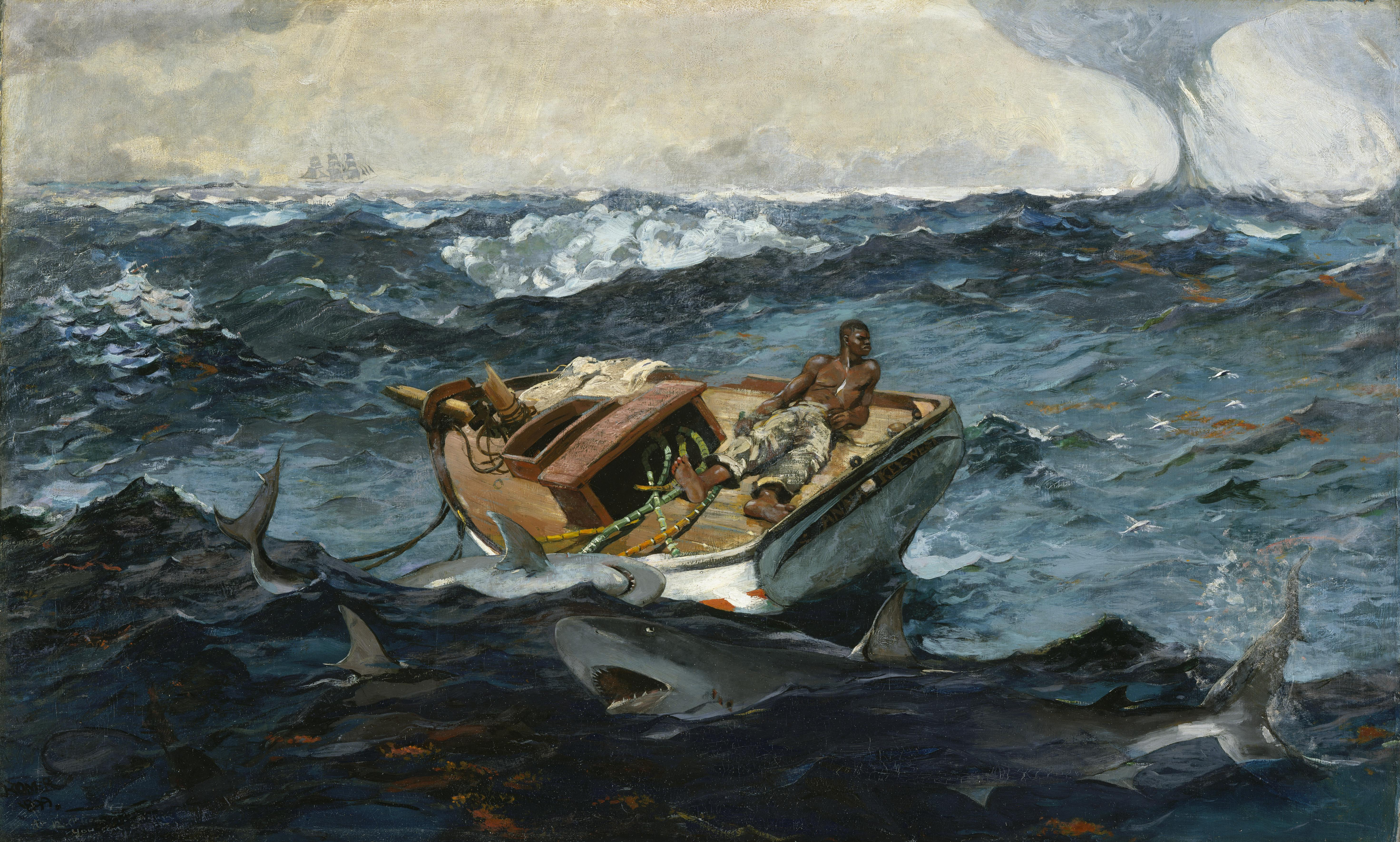
Winslow Homer, The Gulf Stream, 1899, 71.5 cm × 124.8 cm, Metropolitan Museum of Art

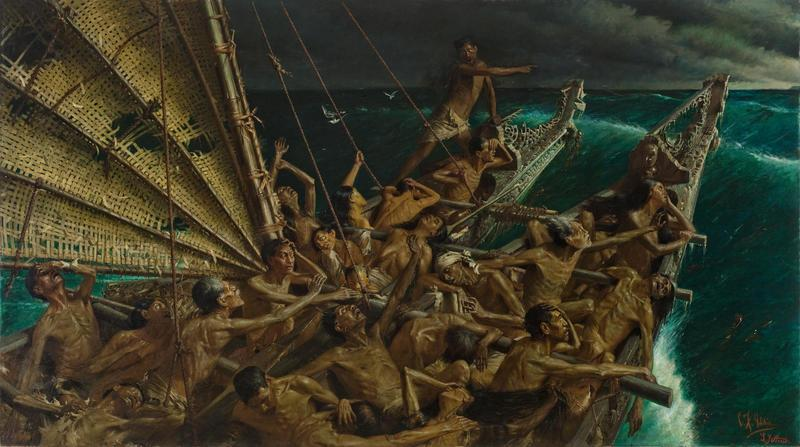
Louis John Steele and Charles Goldie, 1899, 138 cm × 245 cm, Auckland Art Gallery. The artists were familiar with Géricault's painting and it influenced their work The Arrival of the Maoris in New Zealand.

== General and cited references ==
- Alhadeff, Albert. The Raft of the Medusa: Géricault, Art, and Race, Prestel, 2002, ISBN 978-3-7913-2782-2.
- Barnes, Julian. A History of the World in 10½ Chapters. London: Jonathan Cape, 1989. ISBN 0-09-954012-6. Chapter 5, Shipwreck, is an analysis of the painting.
- Barnes, Julian. "Géricault: Catastrophe into Art", in Barnes, Julian. Keeping an Eye Open: Essays on Art. London: Jonathan Cape; New York: Alfred A. Knopf, 2015, pp. 13-41. Barnes describes the actual shipwreck and the extent to which the painting reflects it.
- Berger, Klaus. Gericault: Drawings & Watercolors. New York: H. Bittner and Company, 1946.
- Boime, Albert. Art in an Age of Counterrevolution 1815–1848. Chicago: University of Chicago Press, 2004. ISBN 0-226-06337-2.
- Borias, Georges-Antoine. Géricault: The Raft of the 'Medusa' (film). The Roland Collection of Films on Art. Directed by Touboul, Adrien, 1968.
- Eitner, Lorenz. Géricault's 'Raft of the Medusa'. New York: Phaidon, 1972. ISBN 0-8021-4392-X.
- Eitner, Lorenz. 19th Century European Painting: David to Cézanne. Westview Press, 2002. ISBN 0-8133-6570-8.
- Elsen, Albert. The Gates of Hell by Auguste Rodin. Stanford University Press, 1985. ISBN 0-8047-1273-5.
- Fried, Michael. Manet's Modernism: Or, the Face of Painting in the 1860s. Chicago: University of Chicago Press, 1998. ISBN 0-226-26217-0.
- Grigsby, Darcy Grimaldo. Extremities: Painting Empire in Post-Revolutionary France, (a study of the works of Girodet, Gros, Gericault, and Delacroix). Yale University Press, 2002. ISBN 0-300-08887-6.
- Hagen, Rose-Marie & Hagen, Rainer. What Great Paintings Say. Vol. 1. Taschen, 2007 (25th ed.). 374–377. ISBN 3-8228-4790-9.
- McKee, Alexander. Wreck of the Medusa: The Tragic Story of the Death Raft. London: Souvenir Press, 1975. ISBN 0-451-20044-6.
- McKee, Alexander (2007). Wreck of the Medusa: Mutiny, Murder, and Survival on the High Seas. Skyhorse Publishing. ISBN 978-1602391864.
- Miles, Jonathan. The Wreck of the Medusa: The Most Famous Sea Disaster of the Nineteenth Century. Atlantic Monthly Press, 2007. ISBN 978-0-87113-959-7.
- Muther, Richard. The History of Modern Painting Vol. 1. London: J.M. Dent, 1907.
- Néret, Gilles. Eugène Delacroix: The Prince of Romanticism. Taschen, 2000. ISBN 3-8228-5988-5.
- Nicholas, Lynn H. (1994). The Rape of Europa: the Fate of Europe's Treasures in the Third Reich and the Second World War. New York: Alfred A. Knopf. ISBN 978-0-679-40069-1. OCLC 246524635.
- Noon, Patrick & Bann, Stephen. Crossing the Channel: British and French Painting in the Age of Romanticism. London: Tate Publishing, 2003. ISBN 1-85437-513-X. (See also "Riding" below.)
- Novotny, Fritz. Painting and Sculpture in Europe, 1780 to 1880. Baltimore: Penguin Books, 1960.
- Riding, Christine. "The Raft of the Medusa in Britain". In: Noon, Patrick & Bann, Stephen. Crossing the Channel: British and French Painting in the Age of Romanticism. London: Tate Publishing, June 2003. ISBN 1-85437-513-X.
- Riding, Christine. "The Fatal Raft: Christine Riding Looks at British Reaction to the French Tragedy at Sea Immortalised in Gericault's Masterpiece 'The Raft of the Medusa'" History Today, February 2003.
- Rowe Snow, Edward. Tales of Terror and Tragedy. New York: Dodd Mead, 1979. ISBN 0-396-07775-7.
- Savigny, Jean Baptiste Henri; Corréard, Alexandre. Undertaken by Order of the French Government, Comprising an Account of the Shipwreck of the Medusa, the Sufferings of the Crew, and the Various Occurrences on Board the Raft, in the Desert of Zaara, at St. Louis, and at the Camp of Daccard. To which are Subjoined Observations Respecting the Agriculture of the Western Coast of Africa, from Cape Blanco to the Mouth of the Gambia. London: Cockburn, 1818.
- Wellington, Hubert, ed. (1980) [1951]. The Journal of Eugène Delacroix: A Selection. Ithaca, NY: Cornell University Press. ISBN 0-8014-9196-7 – via the Internet Archive..
- Wintle, Justin. Makers of Nineteenth Century Culture. London: Routledge, 2001. ISBN 0-415-26584-3.
