= Agostino Aglio =

Italian painter, decorator, and engraver (1777–1857)

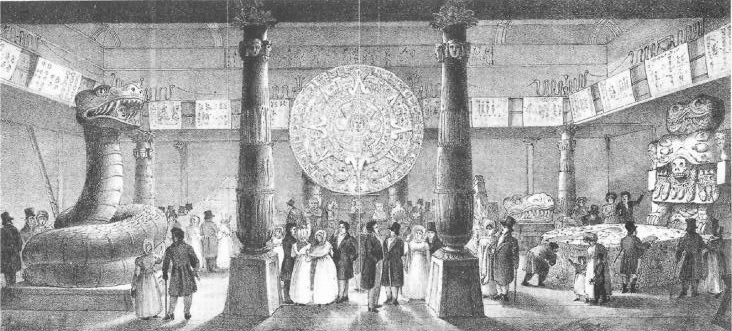
Engraving by Aglio, of the 1824 Ancient Mexico exhibition, a collection of New World antiquities organised by William Bullock.

The now demolished church of St Mary Moorfields, London: Aglio painted the panoramic fresco of the Crucifixion behind the high altar.

Agostino Aglio (15 December 1777 – 30 January 1857) was an Italian painter, decorator, and engraver.

== Biography ==
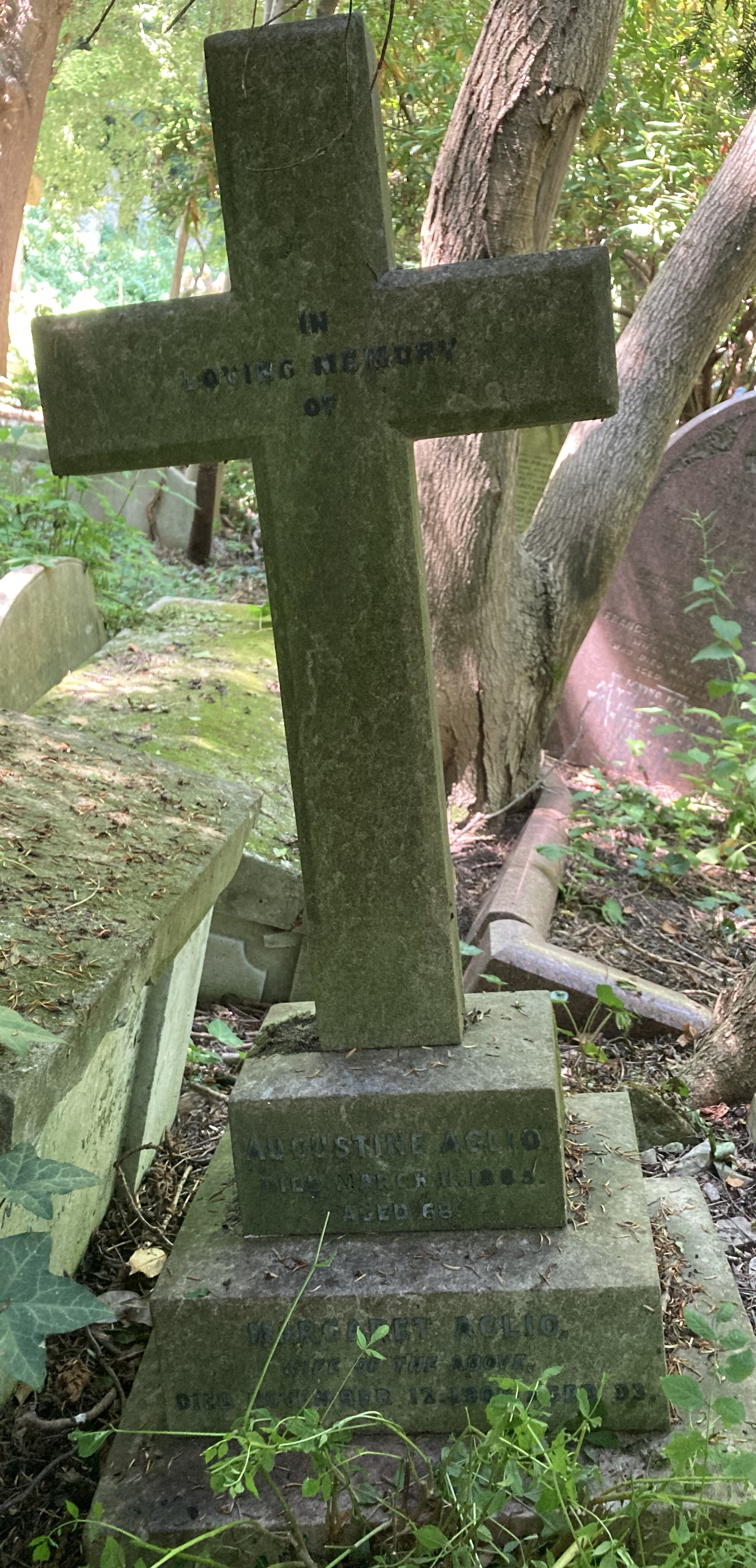
Grave of Agostino Aglio in Highgate Cemetery

He was born at Cremona. He initially studied at the Brera Academy under Giocondo Albertolli, and then traveled to Rome to work under Campovecchio Mantovano. In 1803 he came to England to assist William Wilkins, the well-known architect, in the production of his Antiquities of Magna Graecia which was published in 1807. For many years Aglio was employed in the decoration of theaters, churches, and country mansions both in England and Ireland. In 1819, he was employed, along with the architect Giovanni Battista Comolli, in painting vast frescoes for the Roman Catholic Church of St Mary Moorfields, London. Between the years 1820 and 1830, he published several books on art including a Collection of Capitals and Friezes drawn from the Antique and Antiquities of Mexico illustrated with over 1000 plates, drawn from the originals. He also painted a portrait of Queen Victoria, which was engraved.

A street in modern-day Cremona is named after the artist. He died on 30 January 1857 and was buried on the west side of Highgate Cemetery.
