= Ancient Mexico =

19th century exhibition in London, England

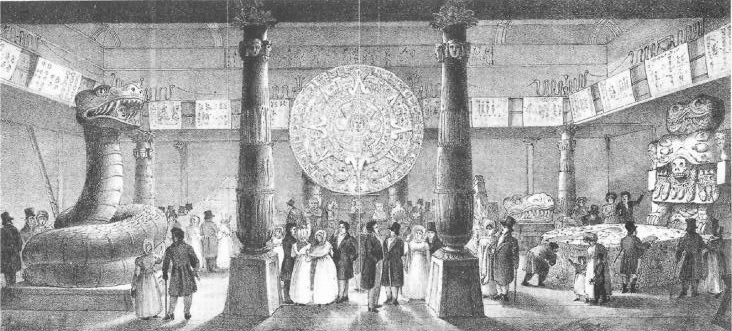
Engraving by Agostino Aglio of the 1824 Ancient Mexico exhibition

Ancient Mexico was an exhibition by William Bullock of casts of Aztec artefacts and both copies and originals of Aztec codices, held in 1824 in the Egyptian Hall in Piccadilly, London. Objects exhibited included the "calendar stone" (described as "Montezuma's watch"), the statue of Coatlicue (called "Teoyamiqui"), the Stone of Tizoc, and an unidentified statue of a giant serpent.
