= Antiquities of Mexico =

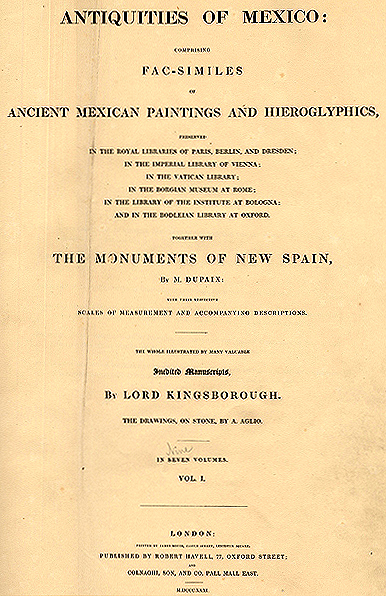
- Title page of volume 1
- Author: Edward King, Viscount Kingsborough
- Publisher: A. Aglio (Vols. 1–5), R. Havell (Vols. 6–7), H.G. Bohn (Vols. 8–9)
- Publication date: 1830–1848
- Publication place: London, England
- Media type: elephant folio
- Pages: 9 vols.
- OCLC: 5852094

Antiquities of Mexico is a compilation of facsimile reproductions of Mesoamerican literature such as Maya codices, Mixtec codices, and Aztec codices, and also historical accounts and explorers' descriptions of archaeological ruins. It was assembled and published by Edward King, Viscount Kingsborough, in the early decades of the 19th century. While much of the material pertains to pre-Columbian cultures, there are also documents relevant to studies of the Spanish conquest of the Aztec Empire. Antiquities of Mexico was produced to make copies of rare manuscripts in European collections available for study by scholars.

The work consists of nine volumes, each published in a large elephant folio format. It was originally planned as ten, but Lord Kingsborough died before the full work could be completed.

Kingsborough commissioned the Italian landscape painter Agostino Aglio to furnish the reproduction drawings and lithographs of the Mesoamerican artworks and codices used to illustrate the volumes. Born in Cremona and resident in London since 1803, Aglio had previously illustrated antiquities of Ancient Egypt and Magna Græcia on behalf of the English architect William Wilkins. Aglio spent the better part of six years travelling to the libraries and museums of Europe to examine and draw all of the "Ancient Mexican" documents, artifacts, and manuscripts known in European collections of the time.

Many of the facsimiles of codices are hand-colored.
