= Pierre-Désiré Guillemet =

French painter

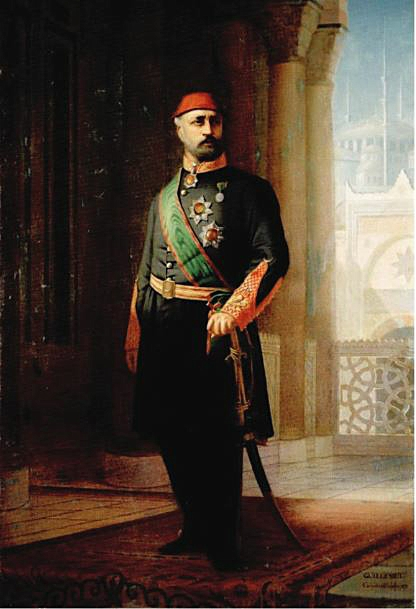
Portrait of Sultan Abdulaziz

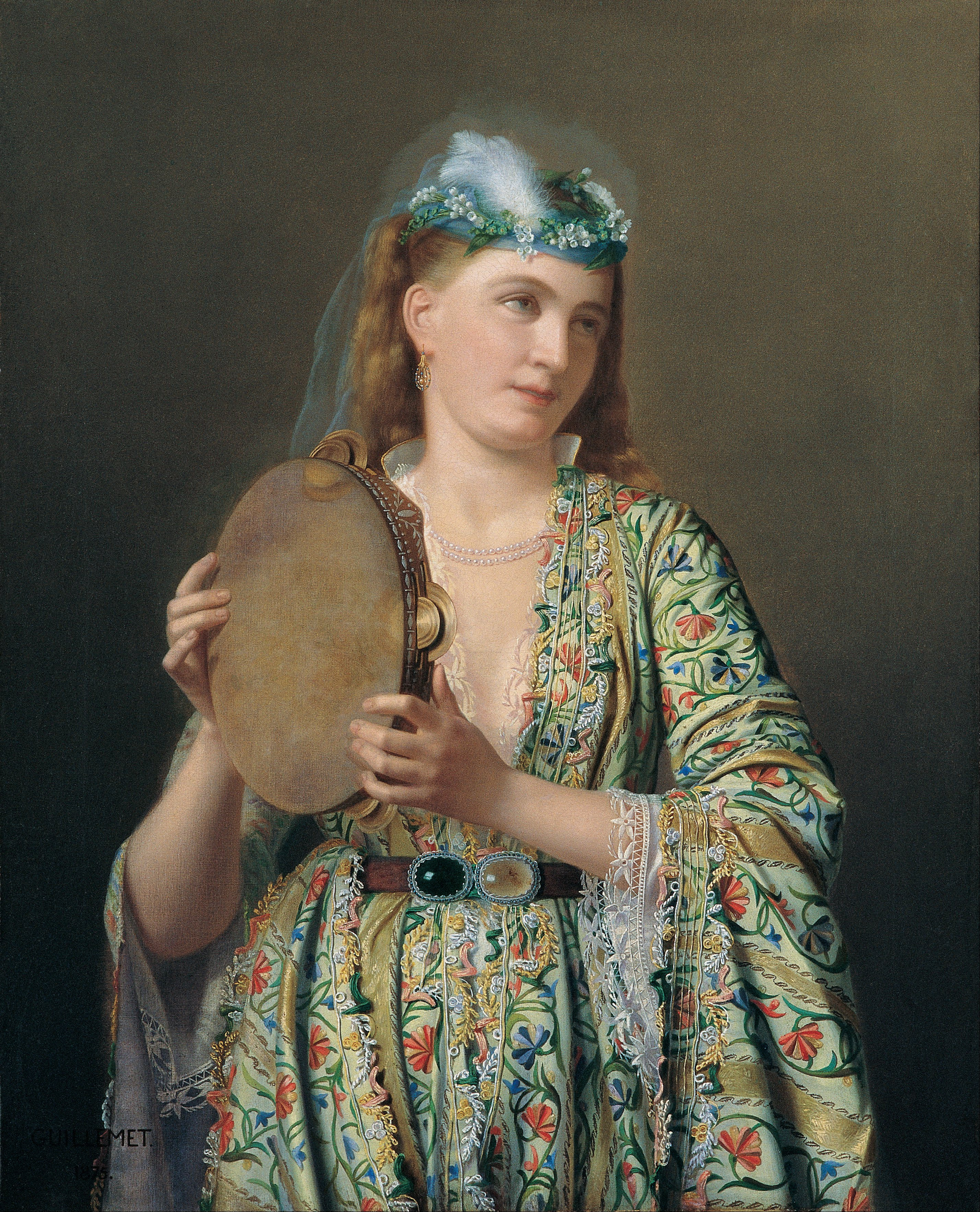
Courtier Playing the Tambourine

Pierre-Désiré Guillemet (29 March 1827, Lyon – 29 April 1878, Istanbul) was a French history painter. He is primarily known for the Orientalist works he painted during the thirteen years he lived in Istanbul.

== Biography ==
He was a student at the École Nationale Supérieure des Beaux-Arts de Lyon from 1844 to 1847, followed by studies in Paris with Hippolyte Flandrin. From 1857 to 1863, he regularly exhibited historical scenes and portraits at all the Parisian salons. Until 1869, he made numerous copies of portraits of Napoléon III and the Empress Eugénie for use in various government buildings throughout France.

In 1860, together with Étienne-Antoine-Eugène Ronjat, he created a full size copy of The Raft of the Medusa by Gericault. It was ordered by Émilien de Nieuwerkerke, Manager of the Louvre, to be loaned for exhibitions, as the original had deteriorated to the point where it was too delicate to move.

In 1864, he accompanied Emmanuel Miller in his quest to collect ancient Greek and Roman antiquities from the European holdings of the Ottoman Empire and transport them to France, the most notable of which was Las Incantadas, a Roman pillared portico with reliefs from Salonica, which they removed to the shock and outrage of the city's population.

In 1865, he went to Istanbul, at the request of Sultan Abdulaziz, an enthusiastic admirer of European arts and sciences, to paint his portrait in Western style. The Sultan was sufficiently pleased with it to name Guillemet the "Palace Painter'. He brought his wife there in 1866, and would remain for the rest of his life.

In 1873, he presented the paintings of Şeker Ahmed Pasha; the first exhibition of works by a Turkish artist. The following year, he opened a drawing and painting academy in Beyoğlu, the European quarter of Istanbul; becoming the first of its kind there. He and his wife gave lessons in Western-style painting; primarily watercolors and pastels. In 1876, his students exhibited their works for the first time. The school gained recognition from many European artists and had the personal support of Sultan Abdulaziz, who allowed Guillemet to paint the women of his harem.

In 1877, he inaugurated the "Imperial Art School" (Mekteb-i Sanayi-i Chabane); serving as its director. This served as the inspiration for the "School of Fine Arts" (Sanâyi-i Nefîse Mektebi, now known as the Mimar Sinan Fine Arts University), which was founded by Osman Hamdi Bey in 1883.

During the Russo-Turkish War, he died of typhoid fever; contracted while trying to assist the refugees and wounded who were pouring into Istanbul. He was interred in the Pangaltı Catholic Cemetery, in the Feriköy district.
