= A Disaster at Sea =

Painting by J. M. W. Turner

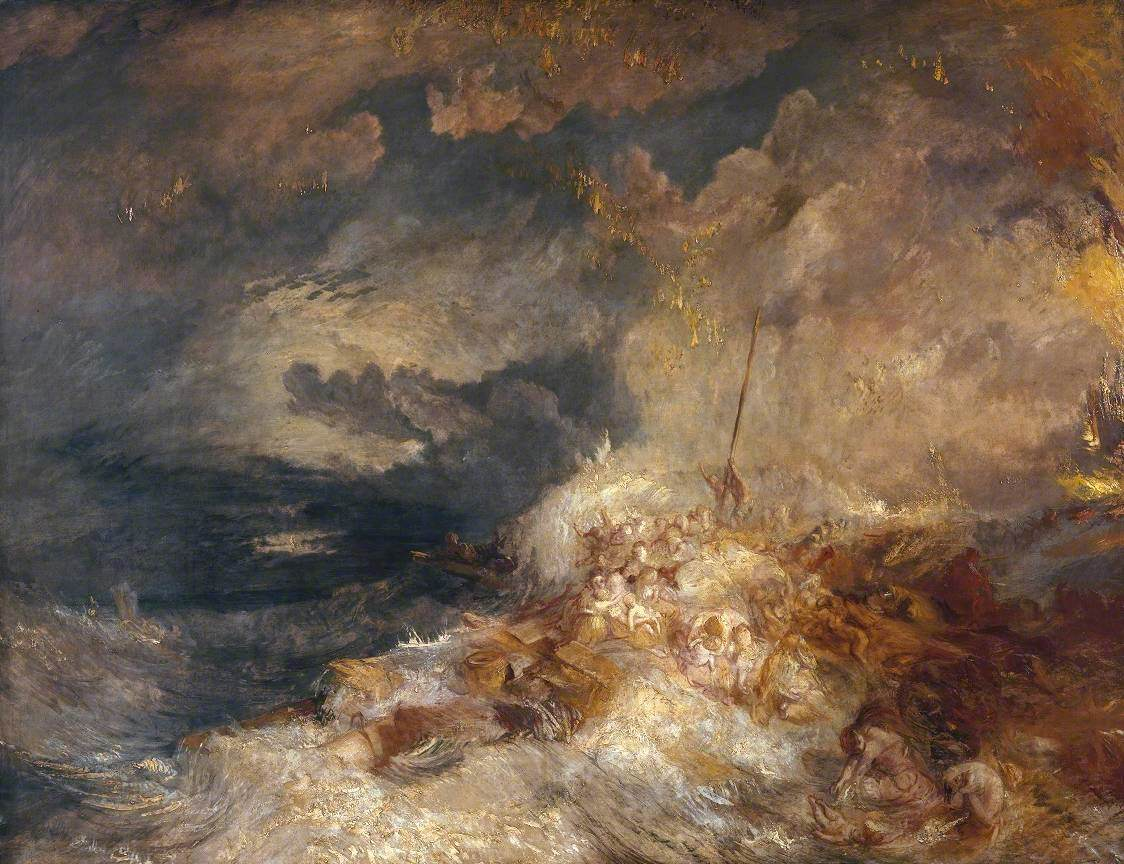
- Artist: J. M. W. Turner
- Year: c.1835
- Type: Oil on canvas, landscape painting
- Dimensions: 171.4 cm × 220.3 cm (67.5 in × 86.7 in)
- Location: Tate Britain, London

A Disaster at Sea is a c. 1835 seascape painting by the British artist J.M.W. Turner. It depicts a ship floundering at sea with those on board clinging desperately to the sinking vessel. The painting was never exhibited in Turner's lifetime and is likely to be unfinished, although by the latter stages of Turner's career his Romantic style became increasingly abstract and impressionist.

The work is generally held to be inspired by the loss of Amphitrite, a vessel carrying convicts being transported to Australia, off Boulogne in August 1833. It has also been suggested that it may have been based on Hibernia, a ship that caught fire in the Atlantic Ocean with too few lifeboats on board.

Stylistically and the thematically the painting draws on the 1819 work The Raft of the Medusa by Théodore Géricault which Turner had seen when it was displayed in London in the early 1820s. The painting was part of the Turner Bequest to the United Kingdom in 1856. It is now part of the collection of the Tate Britain in Pimlico.

== See also ==
- The Wreck of a Transport Ship, an 1810 painting by Turner
- List of paintings by J. M. W. Turner

== Bibliography ==
- Bailey, Anthony. J.M.W. Turner: Standing in the Sun. Tate Enterprises, 2013.
- Delgado, James P.The Great Museum of the Sea: A Human History of Shipwrecks. Oxford University Press, 2025.
- Reynolds, Graham. Turner. Thames & Hudson, 2022.
- Thompson, Carl. Shipwreck in Art and Literature: Images and Interpretations from Antiquity to the Present Day. Taylor & Francis, 2014.
