= William Bullock (collector) =

Naturalist and collector from England

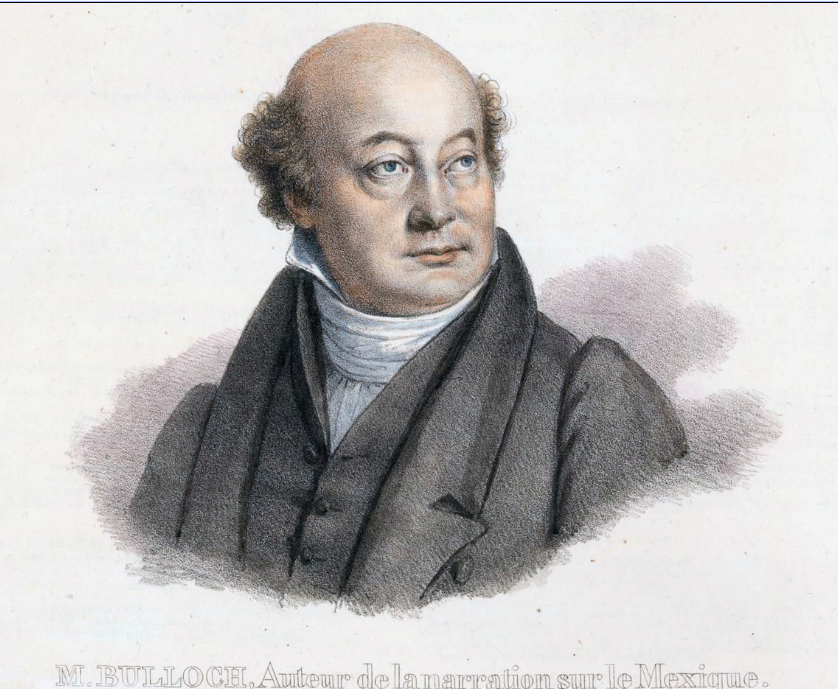
- Bullock by Jean-Henri Marlet
- Born: c. 1773; England, Great Britain
- Died: 7 March 1849 (aged c. 76); London, England, British Empire
- Scientific career
- Fields: Naturalist, antiquarian

William Bullock (c. 1773 – 7 March 1849) was an English traveller, natural history specimen collector, showman, and antiquarian. He established what was called Bullock's Museum, first in Liverpool which he then moved to London. He established Egyptian Hall where he held popular exhibitions. His collections were publicly auctioned in 1819. A few animal species were described on the basis of specimens from his collection. These include the birds Merops bulocki and Bullock's oriole Icterus bullockii (named after him and his namesake son).

== Life ==
Little is known of Bullock's early life. He came from a family that held travelling shows of waxworks. He had at least three brothers of whom George was particularly close. George was a sculptor, cabinetmaker and mason who died in 1818 while working on furnishing the home of Sir Walter Scott. William began as a goldsmith and jeweller in Birmingham. From the 1790s to 1891 he ran a home museum in Sheffield. By 1795, Bullock was in Liverpool, where he founded a Museum of Natural Curiosities at 24 Lord Street. While still trading as a jeweller and goldsmith, in 1801, he published a descriptive catalogue (Companion to Bullock's Museum) of the works of art, armoury, objects of natural history, and other curiosities in the collection, some of which had been brought back by members of James Cook's expeditions. He was supplying animals both live and preserved to Edward Smith-Stanley, 13th Earl of Derby. In 1809, Bullock moved to London and the collection, housed first at 22 Piccadilly and in 1812 in the newly built Piccadilly Egyptian Hall, proved extremely popular. In 1816 his financial situation improved when he purchased Napoleon's carriage which was captured in Waterloo. He exhibited it in the hall along with paintings and materials which became a major attraction earning him £35000. With this he was able to create a new Roman Gallery. His collections, which included over 32,000 items, were disposed of by auction in 1819. Some of these specimens were acquired and are held at the Royal Scottish Museum.

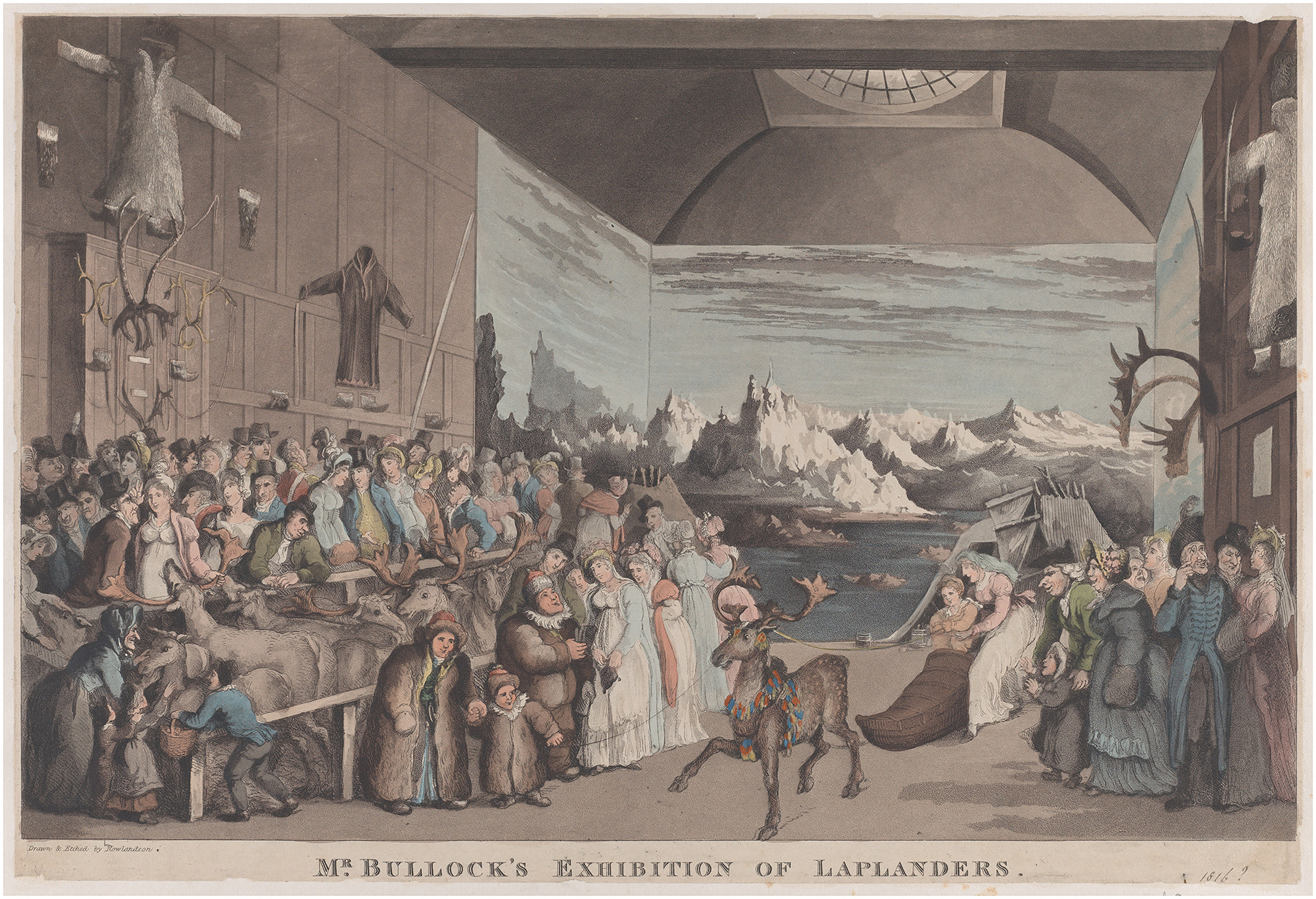
The Saami (Laplander) exhibition, 1822

In 1810, Bullock figured briefly in a law case concerning Sarah Baartman, a Khoikhoi woman brought to England for purposes of exhibition as the "Hottentot Venus". Bullock had been approached by Alexander Dunlop, the army surgeon responsible for Baartman's arrival in England, but had declined to be involved in the proposed show.

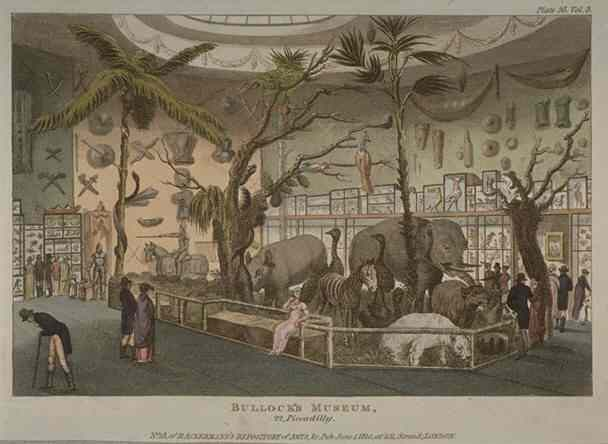
The collection displayed at 22 Piccadilly

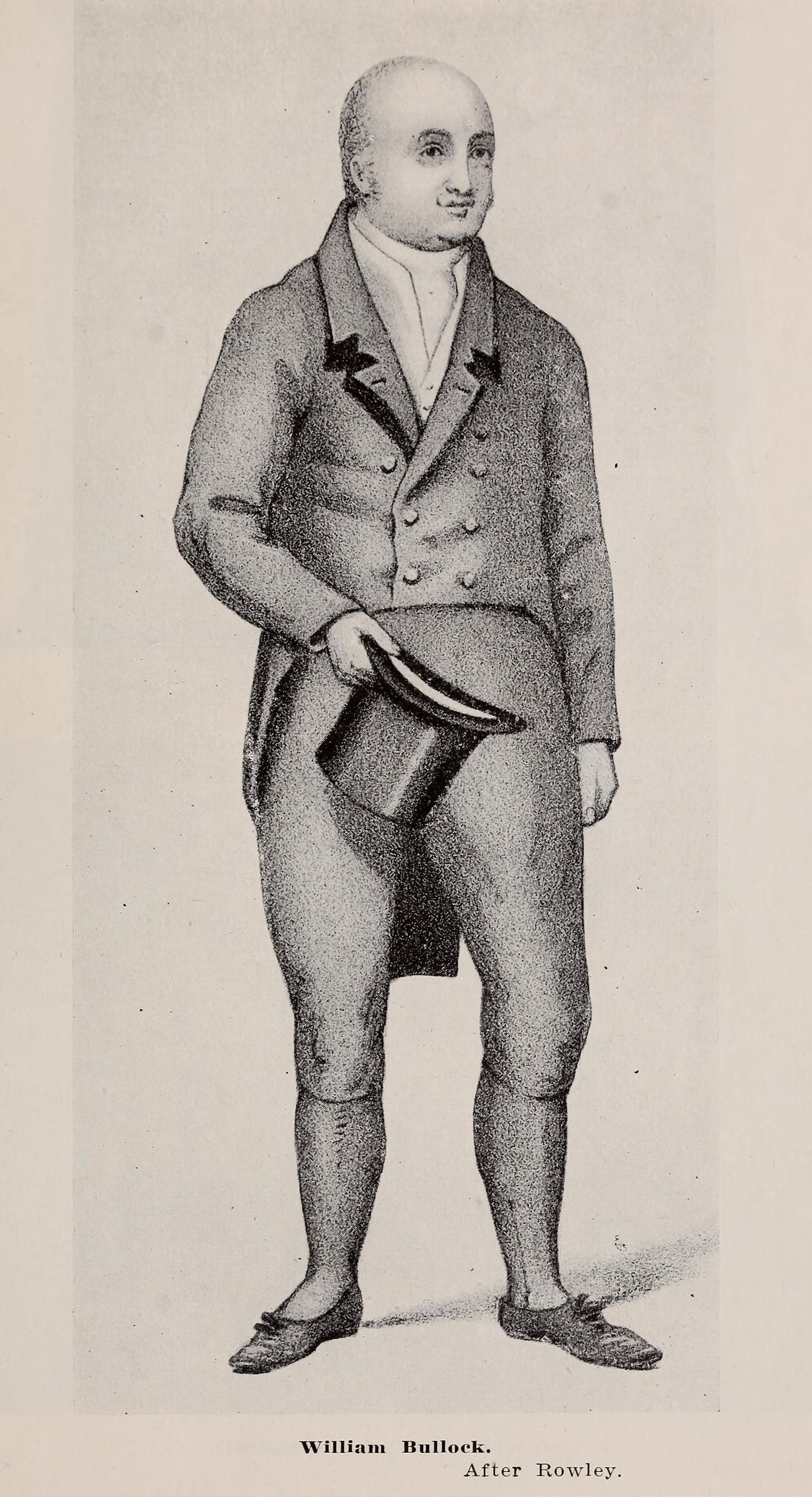
Lithograph by George Rowley

In 1821 Bullock and his namesake son collected specimens from northern Scandinavia, hiring also a Saami family and their reindeer which they exhibited in 1822 at the Egyptian hall. It had a panoramic backdrop painted and a with two huts made of reindeer skins. The reindeer were held in a pen and the public could touch them.

In 1822, Bullock went to Mexico where he became involved in silver mine speculation. He brought back many artefacts and specimens which formed a new exhibition in the Egyptian Hall. On his return from Mexico he wrote Six months in Mexico (1824). He made a second visit to Mexico along with his son William, and to the United States in 1827. Bullock bought land on the bank of the Ohio River from Thomas D. Carneal where he proposed to build a utopian community named Hygeia (a Greek word meaning health) laid out by John Buonarotti Papworth. The speculation was not a success, although some people, including Frances Trollope, took part; Bullock sold the land to Israel Ludlow, Jr. in 1846.

Bullock was back in London by 1843 and died there at 14 Halsey Terrace, Chelsea. He was buried in a now lost vault at St Mary's Church, Chelsea, on 16 March 1849. Bullock's first wife died in 1801 and they had a son William and daughter Anne Elizabeth (born 1800).

Bullock was elected a fellow of the Linnean Society in 1810 despite opposition from William E. Leach who considered him more of a showman than a naturalist. He also became a fellow of the Horticultural, Geological, Wernerian, and other learned societies, and published several pamphlets on natural history.

== Works ==
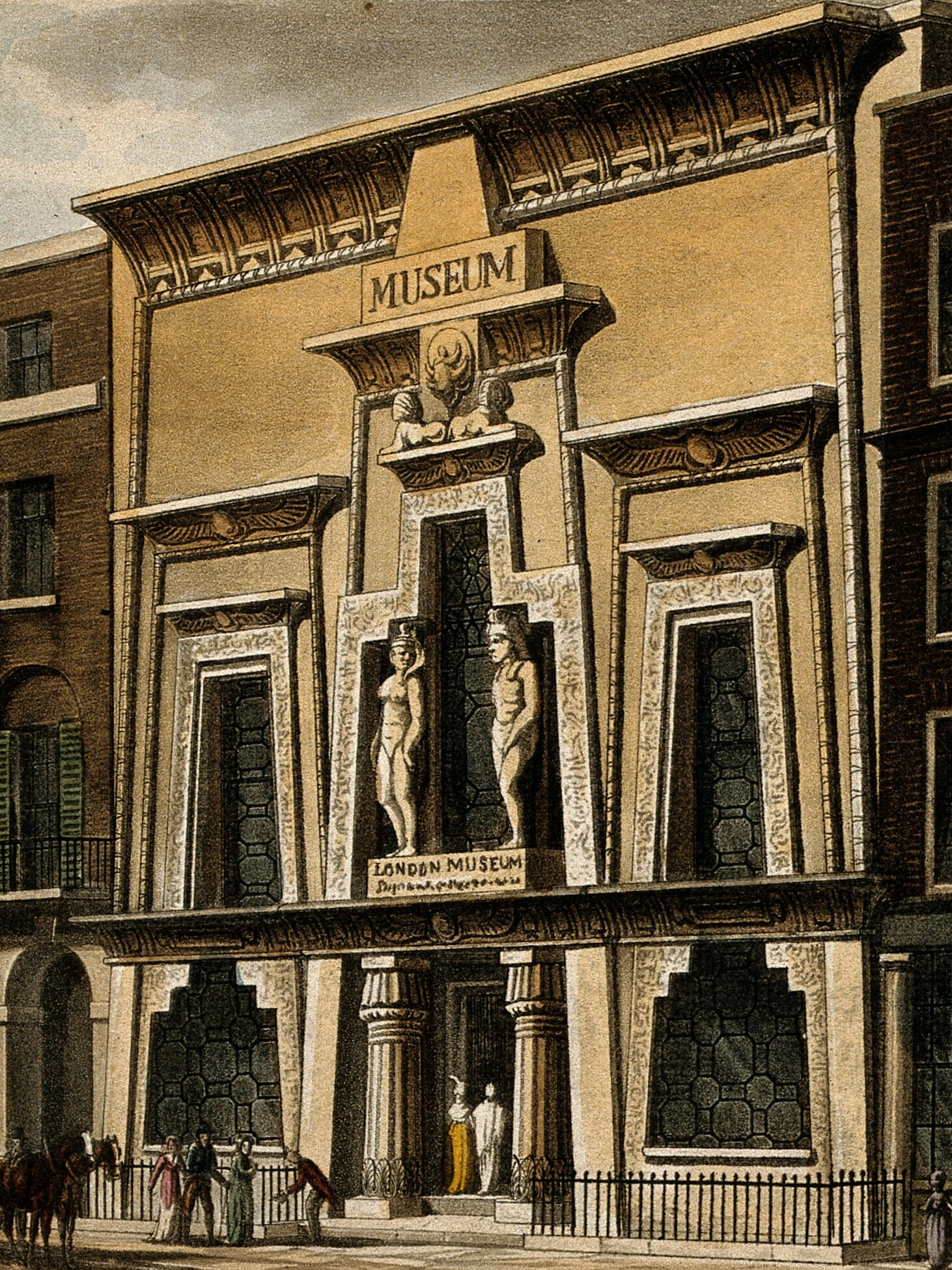
Egyptian Hall

- A Companion to the Liverpool Museum, containing a brief description of ... natural & foreign curiosities, antiquities & productions of the fine arts, open for public inspection ... at the house of William Bullock, Church Street. Liverpool: T. Schofield, printer, ca. 1801., numerous editions. (1809 edition)
- A concise and easy method of preserving objects of natural history: intended for the use of sportsmen, travellers, and others; to enable them to prepare and preserve such curious and rare articles. London: printed for the proprietor, 1818. 2. Ed.
- Six months' residence and travels in Mexico; containing remarks on the present state of New Spain, its natural productions, state of society, manufactures, trade, agriculture, and antiquities, &c.. London: John Murray, 1824.
  - Sechs Monate in Mexiko oder Bemerkungen über den gegenwärtigen Zustand Neu-Spaniens von W. Bullock. Aus dem Engl. übers. von Friedrich Schott. Dresden: Hilscher, 1825.
  - Le Mexique en 1823, ou Relation d'un voyage dans la Nouvelle-Espagne, contenant des notions exactes et peu connues sur la situation physique, morale et politique de ce pays. Paris: Alexis-Eymery, 1824.
- A description of the unique exhibition, called Ancient Mexico: collected on the spot in 1823 ... for public inspection at the Egyptian Hall, Piccadilly. London: Printed for the proprietors, 1824.
- Catalogue of the exhibition, called Modern Mexico: containing a panoramic view of the city, with specimens of the natural history of New Spain ... at the Egyptian Hall, Piccadilly. London: Printed for the proprietor, 1824
- A descriptive catalogue of the exhibition, entitled Ancient and Modern Mexico: containing a panoramic view of the present city, specimens of the natural history of New Spain ... at the Egyptian Hall, Piccadilly. London: Printed for the proprietors, 1825.
- Sketch of a journey through the Western States of North America: from New Orleans, by the Mississippi, Ohio, city of Cincinnati and falls of Niagara, to New York, in 1827. London: Miller, 1827
