= Jean-Henri Marlet =

French painter

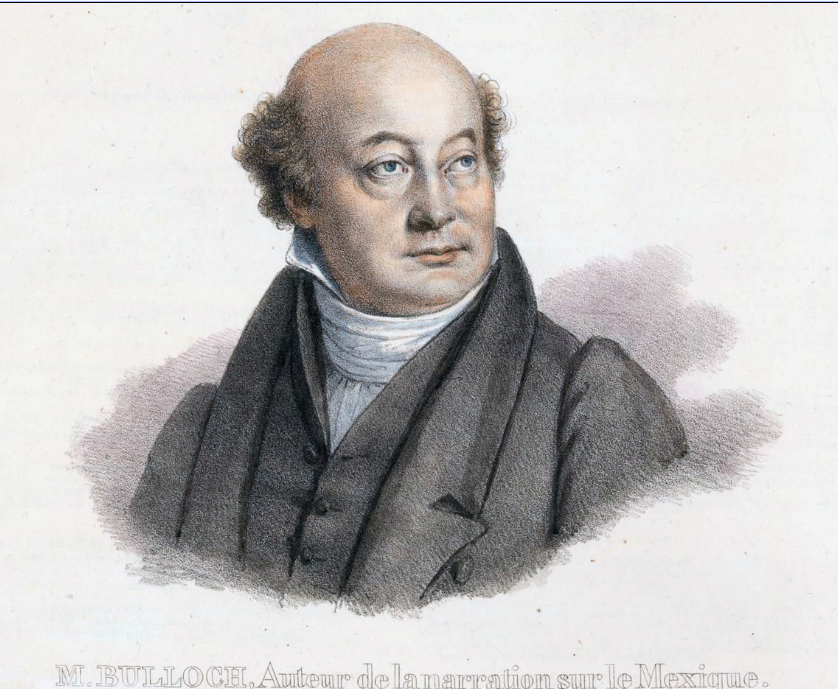
William Bullock (c. 1773–1849), English traveller, naturalist and antiquarian

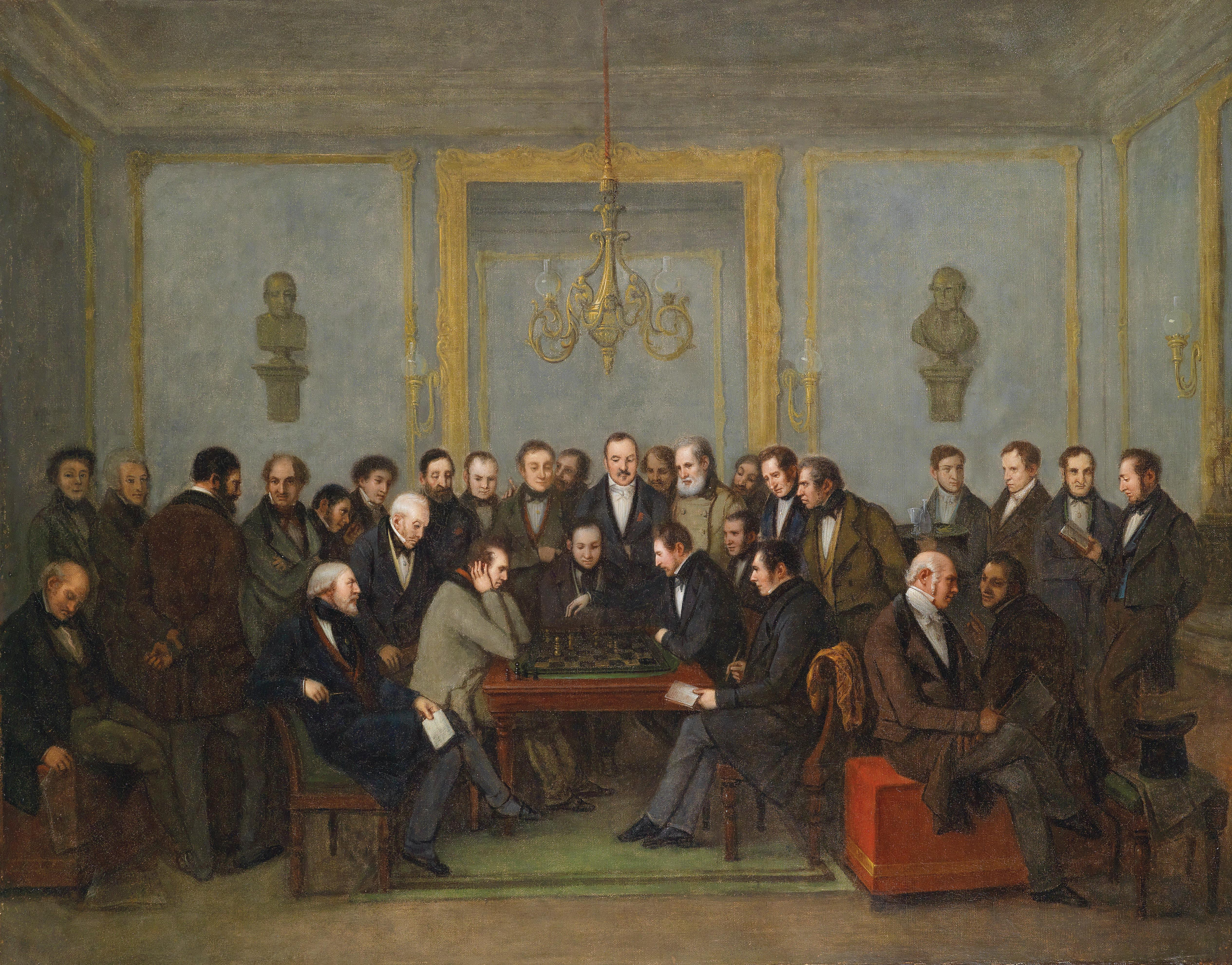
The Famous Chess Match between Howard Staunton and Pierre Charles Fournier de Saint-Amant, on 16 December 1843

Jean-Henri Marlet, aka Jean Henry Marlet (18 November 1771 – 1847), was a French painter and engraver.

He was born in Autun. He was a student at l'Académie de Dijon, and after the Revolution in the studio of Baron Jean-Baptiste Regnault. He painted large tableaux depicting historic events and was one of the first artists to use lithography in France. His proofs were made in the studios of Lasteyrie or Engelmann, then printed by himself between 1822 and 1832. During the Bourbon Restoration his images were patriotic, with a vitality equal to that of Nicolas-Toussaint Charlet, Auguste Raffet or Carle Vernet. He was responsible for a series of 72 prints showing scenes in Paris.

- 1804 : L'Enlèvement de Briséis, Scène des Champs- Élysée, Orphée jouant de la lyre, Chasse de Diane, Les Sabines sortant de Rome - these four compositions are drawn in pen.
- 1806 : Pie VII donnant sa bénédiction aux enfants au pavillon de Flore aux Tuileries, Les Nymphes de Calypso, guidées par l'Amour, allant mettre le feu au vaisseau d'Ulysse, La Chasse de Télémaque dans l'île de Calypso, Télémaque allant aux enfers, Naufrage de La Fère.
- 1808 : La Madeleine chez le pharisien pour l'église des Blancs- Manteaux, Un Nègre blessé pansé par des enfants, Visite d'Asker-Kan, ambassadeur de Perse, à M. de Champigny.
- 1810 : Une Première communion de jeunes filles, Un Atelier de jeunes peintres, Asker-Kan recevant des dames dans son salon à la manière persane, Trait de la vie de Fénélon, Sujets de la vie de Télémaque, Cortége de Leurs Majestés traversant la Galerie du Musée pour se rendre à la chapelle, Portrait de M. Audry, médecin, donnant des consultations chez lui.
- 1812 : La Malédiction paternelle, La Réconciliation, Raphaël recevant le pape Léon X dans son atelier lui fait voir le tableau de la Sainte Famille commandé par François Ier.
- 1814 : Charles-Quint ramassant le pinceau du Titien, Distribution d'aliments aux pauvres.
- 1817 : La Mort de l'abbé Chappe à la Californie, Sermon dans l'église du port à Clermont en Auvergne, Arrivée des prisonniers des armées alliées sur la place de Jode à Clermont, Raphaël dans son atelier peignant sa maîtresse, Concert au quinzième siècle, Buste de Louis XVIII porté en triomphe par les habitants de Nevers, Un Lutrin de village.
- 1819 : Dessins pour Les Croisades, et for La Henriade of Voltaire, Le Retour de l'exilé, Le Duc d'Angoulême visitant le Mont-de-Piété, La Reddition de Huningue, Les Missionnaires au mont Valérien.

Marlet also produced genre paintings and portraits of celebrities. He was awarded a medal in 1822, and several awards in Paris.
