= Peach black =

Peach black is a grey-black pigment originally obtained from burnt peach stones. Other early formulations included aniline black and soot from burnt petroleum or wax. According to some sources, the pigment has a tendency to green, making it useful for darkening foliage and ground cover.
