= The Barque of Dante (Manet) =

Painting by Edouard Manet

Barque of Dante (Manet)
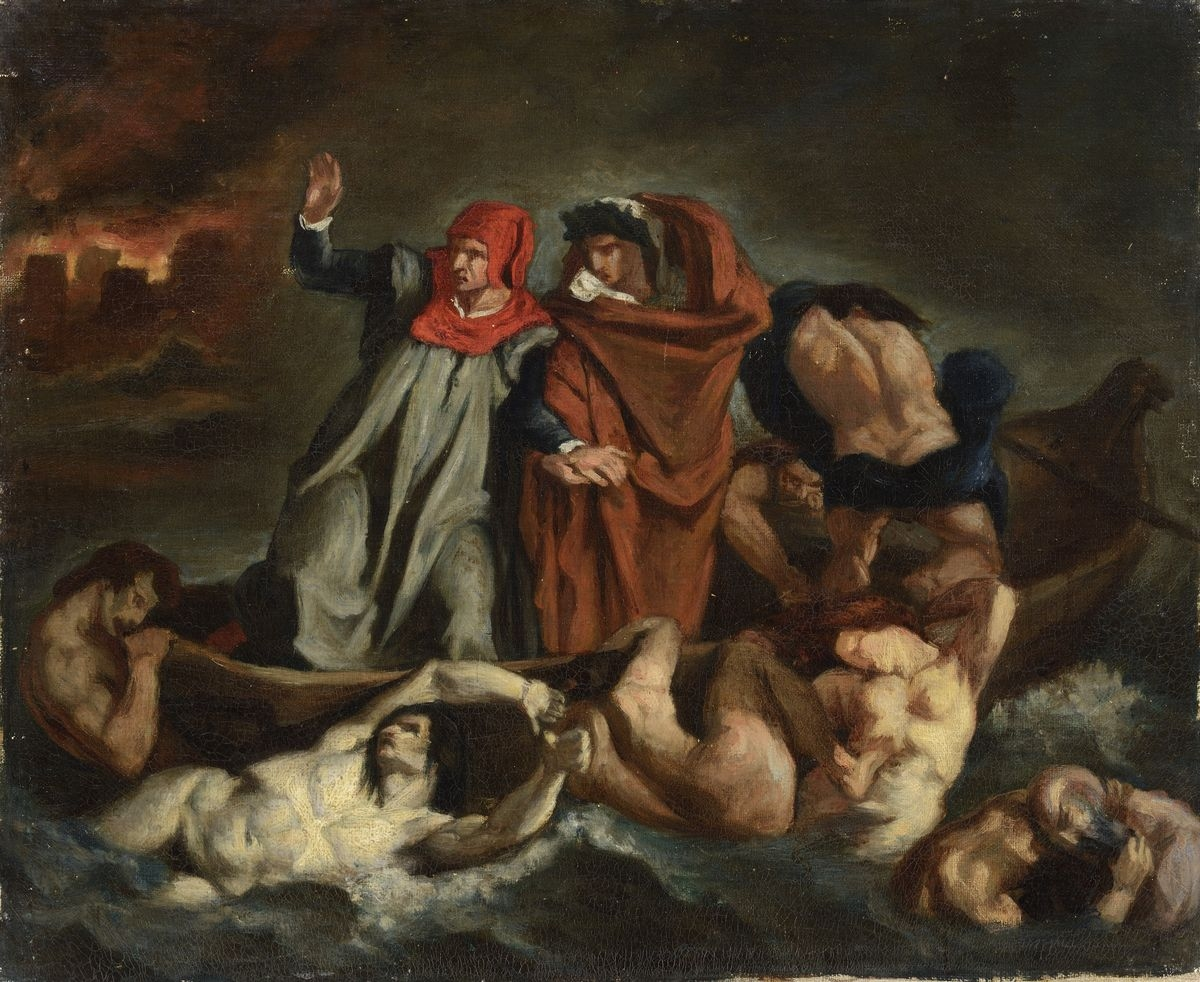
- Artist: Édouard Manet
- Year: 1854 to 1858
- Type: Oil paint on canvas
- Dimensions: 36 by 46 centimetres (14 in × 18 in)
- Location: Museum of Fine Arts of Lyon, Lyon

The Barque of Dante is an oil on canvas painting by Édouard Manet, after The Barque of Dante by Eugène Delacroix, executed between 1854 and 1858. It is now in the Museum of Fine Arts of Lyon.

The painting depicts events from canto eight of Dante Alighieri's Inferno, in which Dante is escorted across the River Styx by his guide, the classical poet Virgil. The City of the Dead burns in the background.

A second version of the subject, c. 1853, is held by the Metropolitan Museum of Art in New York City.

== Gallery ==
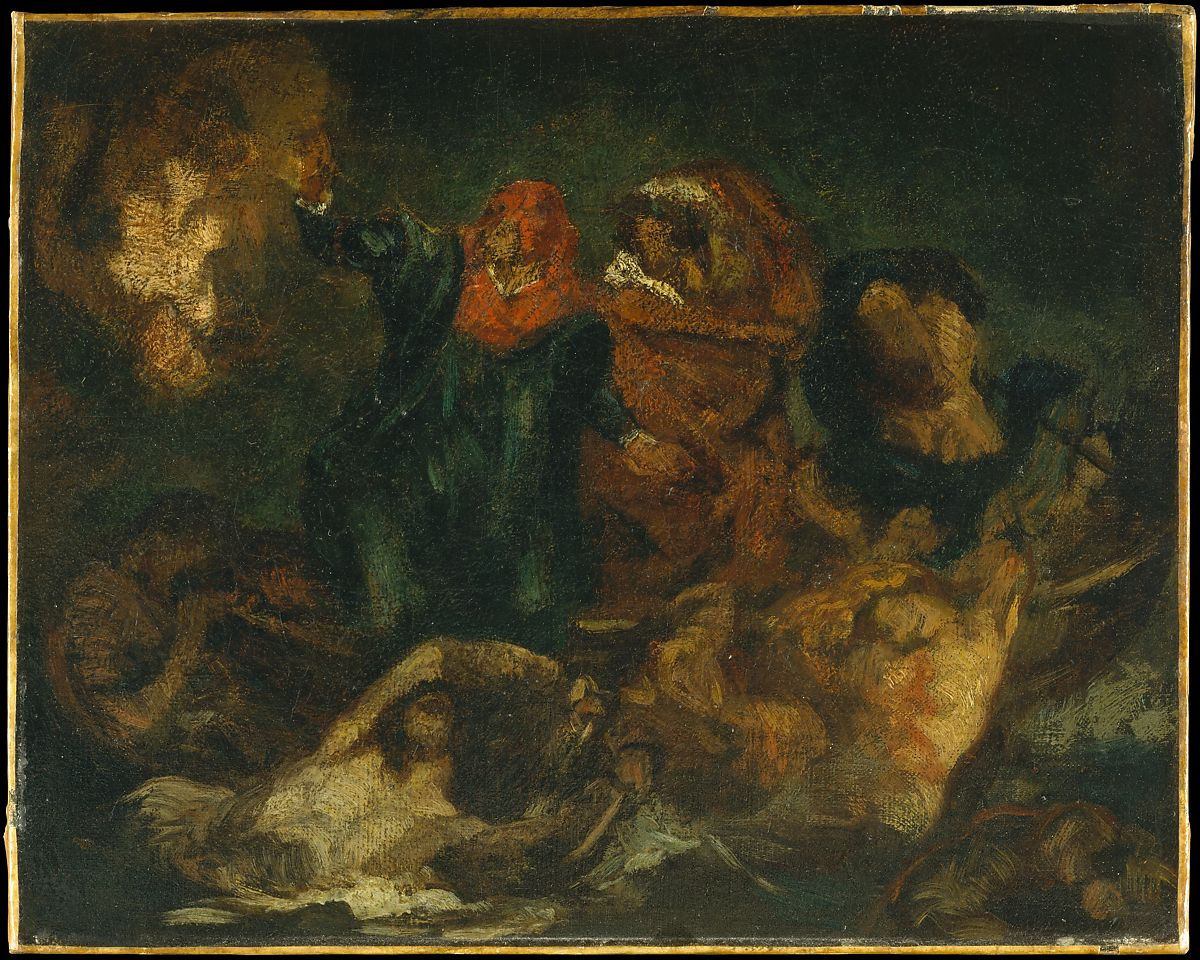
Barque of Dante by Manet, ca. 1853, Metropolitan Museum of Art, New York

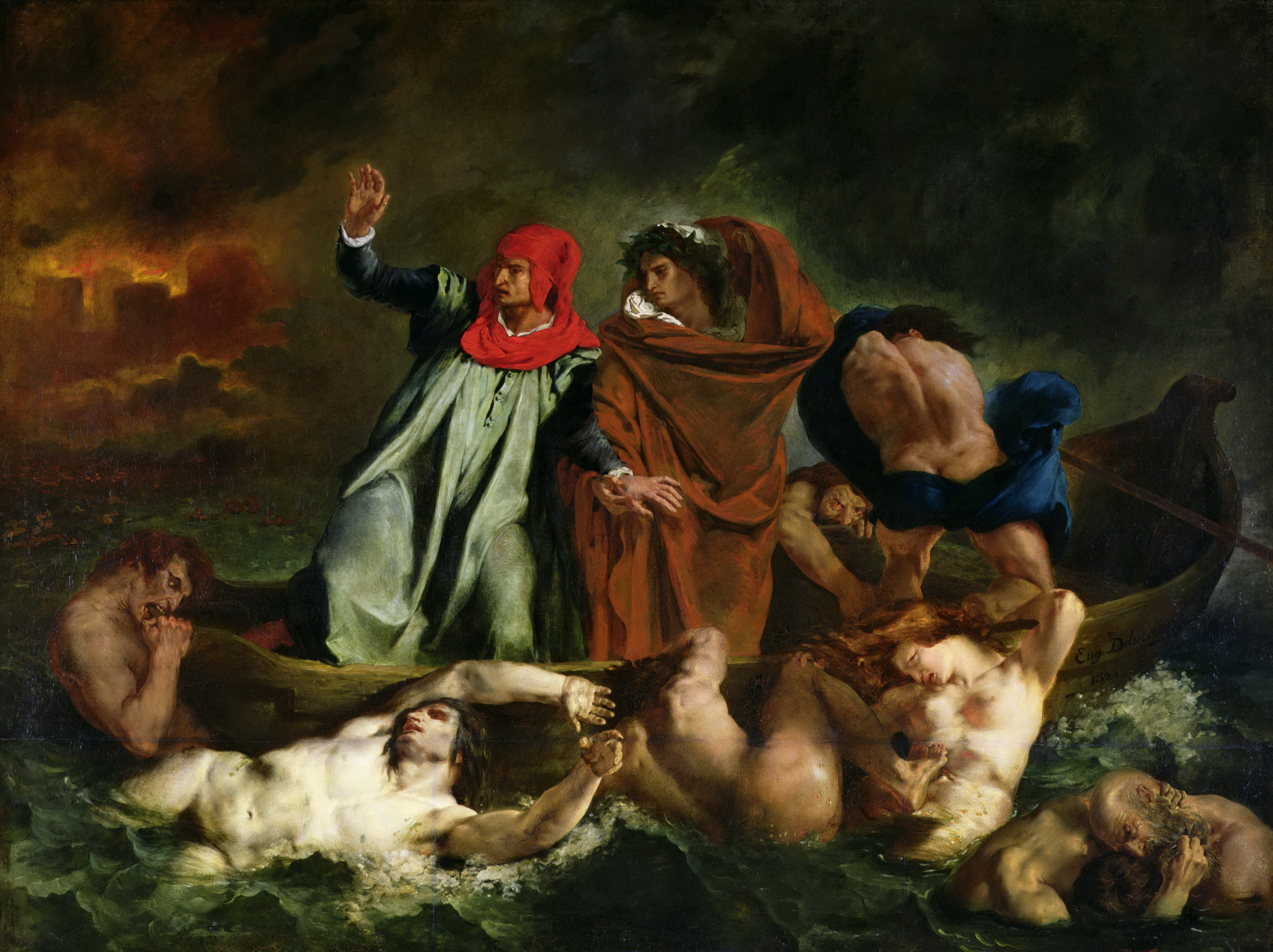
Barque of Dante by Delacroix, 1822, The Louvre, Paris

== See also ==
- List of paintings by Édouard Manet
