= Erecura =

Chthonic goddess of the Roman period

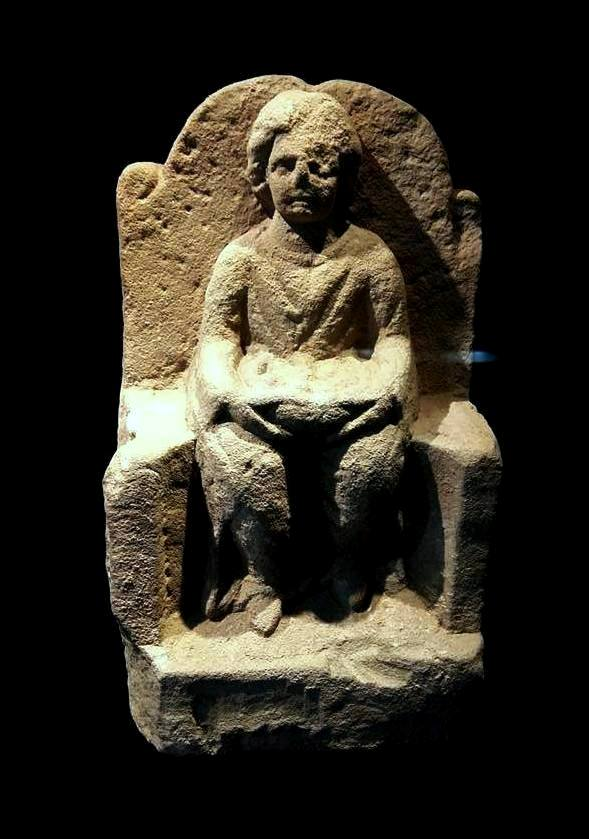
Seated figure of Erecura (Aericura) from Bad Cannstatt, 2nd or 3rd century AD (Landesmuseum Württemberg).

Erecura or Herecura (also Aeracura or Eracura, among many other spellings) was an ancient goddess of the underworld, known only from Latin inscriptions of the Roman period. She appears most often as the partner of the underworld god Dis Pater, with whom she forms an infernal couple, but she is also named on her own. Her cult is attested chiefly in Germania Superior, with further dedications in Italy, in the Danubian and Alpine provinces, and by isolated finds in Gaul, Dacia, Britain and North Africa. The origin of her cult and the meaning of her name are disputed. She is generally seen as Celtic, although a Germanic, Illyrian, or mixed origin have also been proposed.

== Name ==
The goddess's name is transmitted only in Latin inscriptions, and no ancient author mentions her. It is recorded in a wide range of spellings, among them Erecura, Eracura, Aercura (also Aeracura, Aerecura, Araecura, Aericura), and Herecura (also Haricura). (Note: Modern editors mentioning the goddess' name have also applied other variants, including Aeraecura, Eraecura, Ericura, Ercura, and Herequra. However, those do not occur on written inscriptions. The case of Veracura, read by some scholars on AE 1929, 228, but considered erroneous by others, is debated.) By comparing the attested spellings, György Németh has argued that the original form of the name was Ērecura. (Note: Németh observes that the last two syllables are always -cura, while the variation falls on the first two. Word-initial H- appears in only a few of the dedications, and since h was no longer pronounced the spellings with and without it stand for the same sound. The first vowel is long, written E or AE.) A masculine counterpart, the god Arecurius, is recorded on a single dedication from Corbridge in Britain.

The meaning and origin of the name has not been securely established. It is usually taken to be Celtic, though its sense remains obscure. Xavier Delamarre has proposed to read the name as the Celtic *Eri-cura ('west wind').

Marcel Le Glay regarded the goddess as a conflation of various goddesses, including a Celtic one. Jona Lendering has also proposed that she may have been of Illyrian origin. (Note: Lendering has proposed to place her origin in the country north of the Adriatic Sea, where she and the death god (Dis Pater or Sucellus) were jointly venerated in Aquileia, before Roman soldiers took her cult across the Alps to Germania Superior and Raetia.) Others have argued instead for a Germanic origin.

== Cult ==
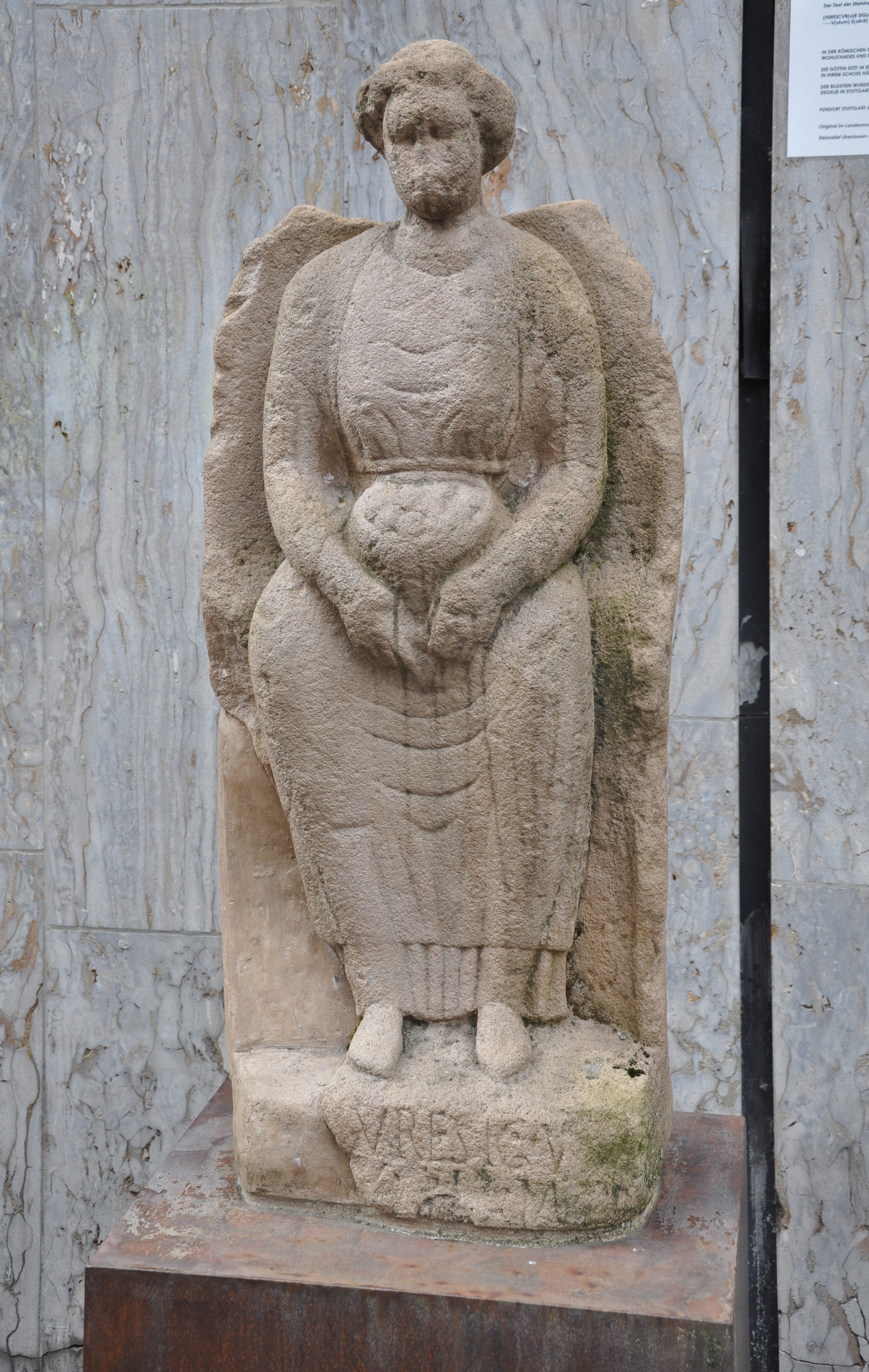
Copy of a Roman relief of Erecura from Bad Cannstatt.

Erecura is known from about 21 inscriptions, most of them from Upper Germany. Beyond this core her cult is attested in Italy, in the Danubian and Alpine provinces of Noricum, Pannonia and Raetia, and by isolated dedications in Gaul, Dacia, Britain and North Africa. Jan de Vries observed that the dedications cluster in southern Germany and the north-western Balkans, the same regions in which the hammer-god Sucellus is absent.

She appears most often beside the underworld god Dis Pater. Their pairing follows a pattern common in the western provinces, in which the male member of a divine couple bears a Latin name while the goddess keeps an indigenous one. The joint cult of Dis Pater and Erecura is recorded on votive altars from Aquileia, Carnuntum and Sulzbach near Karlsruhe. She is also honoured alone, as at Perusia in Etruria, where a married couple restored her shrine (aedes) in fulfilment of a vow, and at Bad Cannstatt and Mogontiacum.

Erecura recurs in a group of Latin curse tablets (defixiones) of the 2nd to 4th centuries AD from the Danubian and Alpine provinces: at Favianae in Noricum, at Carnuntum, at Aquincum in Pannonia Inferior, and at Brigantium (Bregenz) in Raetia. In these texts she is called upon, with Dis Pater or Pluto, to seize the persons named and hand them to the powers below. She is invoked alongside Mercury as guide of the dead, the Manes, and the three-headed Cerberus. On a tablet from Favianae she is identified with the infernal Juno (Iuno inferna), set beside Pluto as the infernal Jupiter.

== Interpretation ==
Erecura is generally understood as a chthonic goddess of the underworld. In her pairing with Dis Pater she takes the place of the classical Proserpina, the abducted queen of the dead, and she is repeatedly assimilated to that figure.

The curse tablets treat her as the consort of Dis Pater or Pluto. On one of the tablets from Aquincum she is asked to commend the cursed to Dis Pater, a function Andrea Barta compares to that of Proserpina, the wife of Pluto, in other spells. The same reading as queen of the underworld underlies her identification with the infernal Juno on a tablet from Favianae, where she is named Iuno inferna beside Pluto as the infernal Jupiter. Stefano Magnani has suggested that the region of Aquileia was a meeting point of Celtic and Graeco-Roman traditions, where she is addressed as Domina ('lady') and the forms Hera Domina and Hera Kyria also occur.

She carries at the same time a strong association with the earth and its fertility. On two inscriptions from Thibilis in Numidia she is equated with Terra Mater, the Earth Mother, and James MacKillop suggests that she may originally have been an earth goddess later drawn into the underworld beside Dis Pater. The link between an earth goddess and the dead has been explained by the natural cycle of birth, death and renewal.

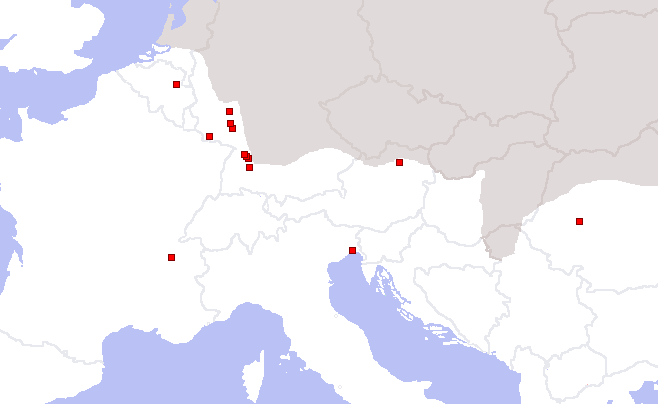
Map showing the location of inscriptions to this goddess, under various spellings.

This double character shows in her iconography. Where she is depicted, Erecura is seated and holds a basket or tray of fruit in her lap, in the manner of the Matres or Matronae. Two such seated figures come from Bad Cannstatt. On the altar from Sulzbach she wears a long robe and bears a tray of fruit, seated next to Dis Pater, who holds an unrolled scroll.

Her chthonic and funerary role is set out most fully in the so-called Tomb of Vibia, a Roman hypogeum of the second half of the 4th century on the Appian Way. In a sequence of painted panels the dead woman Vibia is carried off by the god of the underworld, brought before the enthroned tribunal of Dis Pater and Aeracura, and finally led to the banquet of the blessed. The infernal couple, whose names are written above their figures, pass judgement with the three Fata Divina beside them. The rendering of Proserpina through the "Celto-Germanic" Aeracura is treated by Francisco Marco Simón as one of the most striking features of the tomb.

== Epigraphy ==
The goddess is named in Latin inscriptions of the Roman period. They fall into two groups: votive and dedicatory inscriptions, in which she is honoured with Dis Pater or on her own, and curse tablets, which call on her as a power of the underworld.

The texts below follow the EDCS (Epigraphik-Datenbank Clauss-Slaby). In many of the dedications the word-initial H is an editorial supplement and does not survive on the stone. György Németh has questioned these supplements. Counting only the letters actually preserved, he finds most of the dedications spell the name without an initial h-, and therefore should not be emended to add a missing h-.

Inscriptions naming the goddess
Text	Find-spot	Divine name(s)	Translation	Reference	Comments
Votive and other dedications
Q(uintus) Pedanius Felix et Pedania Iuvenca aedem Aera(e)curae ex voto refecerunt	Perusia (Etruria)	Aeracura	Quintus Pedanius Felix and Pedania Iuvenca restored the shrine of Aeracura in fulfilment of a vow.	AE 1993, 651	Honoured alone. Records the repair of her aedes.
Dis pater Aeracura	Rome	Dis Pater, Aeracura	Dis Pater (and) Aeracura.	CIL VI, 142	A painted label from the Tomb of Vibia, where the pair are enthroned as judges of the dead.
[Diti Patr]i et Aerecurae M(arcus) Aurelius Gaurus vet(eranus) ex voto v(otum) s(olvit) l(ibens) m(erito)	Aquileia (Venetia et Histria)	Dis Pater, Aerecura	To Dis Pater and Aerecura, the veteran Marcus Aurelius Gaurus fulfilled his vow, willingly and deservedly.	CIL V, 725	Dedicated by an army veteran.
I(n) h(onorem) d(omus) d(ivinae) d(eae) S(anctae) Aericur(ae) et Diti Pat(ri) Veter(ius) Paternus et Adie(ctia?) Pater(na)	Sulzbach, near Karlsruhe (Germania Superior)	Aericura, Dis Pater	In honour of the Divine House, to the holy goddess Aericura and to Dis Pater, Veterius Paternus and Adiectia(?) Paterna (set this up).	CIL XIII, 6322	An enthroned pair is carved above the inscribed base.
Herecur(a)e Cottus G[all]i(?) ex voto suscept(o) posuit v(otum) s(olvit) l(ibens) l(aetus) m(erito)	Bad Cannstatt (Germania Superior)	Herecura	To Herecura, Cottus (son) of Gallus(?) set this up in fulfilment of the vow he had undertaken, gladly and deservedly.	CIL XIII, 6438	Honoured alone.
[Herec]ur(a)e sig(num) Val(erius) [...] v(otum) s(olvit) l(ibens) l(aetus) m(erito)	Bad Cannstatt (Germania Superior)	Erecura	To Herecura, Valerius [...] set up (this) image and fulfilled his vow, gladly and deservedly.	CIL XIII, 6439	Records the dedication of a signum (cult image).
In h(onorem) d(omus) d(ivinae) de(ae) (H)erecur(ae) Iul(ius) Verus pro se et su(is) posuit l(ibens) l(aetus) m(erito)	Bad Cannstatt (Germania Superior)	Erecura	In honour of the Divine House, to the goddess Herecura, Iulius Verus set (this) up for himself and his own, gladly and deservedly.	AE 1931, 67	Honoured alone.
Otacilia Matrona Herecur(a)e v(otum) s(olvit) l(ibens) l(aeta) m(erito)	Rottenburg (Sumelocenna) (Germania Superior)	Herecura	Otacilia Matrona fulfilled her vow to Herecura, gladly and deservedly.	CIL XIII, 6359	Honoured alone.
D(e)ae (H)erecur(a)e Ovinius ex voto v(ovit) l(ibens) l(aetus)	Rottenburg (Sumelocenna) (Germania Superior)	dea Erecura	To the goddess Herecura, Ovinius fulfilled his vow, gladly.	CIL XIII, 6363	Honoured alone. Engraved with I for E throughout.
H(e)r(e)c(u)r(ae) Ritie(?) V(i)ct(o)ri(nus) votum s(olvit) l(ibens)	Rottenburg (Sumelocenna) (Germania Superior)	Herecura	To Herecura, ... Victorinus fulfilled his vow, gladly.	CIL XIII, 6360	The name is reduced to its consonants (Hrcr).
[H]erecur(a)e [...]	Stockstadt am Main (Germania Superior)	Erecura	To Herecura [...]	CIL XIII, 6631a	Fragmentary. Only the goddess's name survives.
[Here]cur(a)e Vi[ctor?] v(otum) s(olvit) l(ibens) l(aetus) m(erito)	Freinsheim (Germania Superior)	Erecura	To Herecura, Vi[ctor?] fulfilled his vow, gladly and deservedly.	CIL XIII, 11695a	Fragmentary.
[Ha]erecur(a)e Liberarinia Severa pro salute Severi fili(i) v(otum) s(olvit) l(ibens) l(aeta) m(erito)	Mogontiacum (Germania Superior)	Erecura	To Haerecura, Liberarinia Severa fulfilled her vow for the well-being of her son Severus, gladly and deservedly.	AE 1956, 89	Dedicated for the health of the dedicant's son.
(H)erecur(a)e [S]extilius Cospeitus de suo donavit v(otum) s(olvit) l(ibens) m(erito)	Vieu (Lugdunensis)	Erecura	To Herecura, Sextilius Cospeitus gave (this) at his own expense in fulfilment of a vow, willingly and deservedly.	CIL XIII, 2539	Honoured alone. One of very few dedications from Gaul.
(H)er(e)cur(a)e posuim(us) Serenu(s) et Maru(us?)	Celeia (Noricum)	Erecura	To Herecura, we, Serenus and Maru(us?), set (this) up.	ILLPRON 1960	Honoured alone.
D(iti) P(atri) et Ae(re)c(urae?) Caes(ius) Iustus et Fla(vius) Fronto v(otum) s(olverunt) l(ibentes) m(erito) sac(erdote) Fl(avio) Salvino, a suo sta(tuerunt)	Carnuntum (Pannonia Superior)	Dis Pater, Aerecura	To Dis Pater and Aerecura(?), Caesius Iustus and Flavius Fronto fulfilled their vow, willingly and deservedly, Flavius Salvinus being priest. They set it up at their own expense.	CIL III, 4395	The goddess's name is heavily abbreviated.
Aer(e)cur(a)e Ael(ius) Scenoba(rbus) Ba(tonis?) fil(ius) v(otum) s(olvit) l(ibens)	Alburnus Maior (Dacia)	Aerecura	To Aerecura, Aelius Scenobarbus, son of Bato(?), fulfilled his vow, gladly.	AE 1990, 841	Honoured alone. The dedicant bears a native Illyrian name.
Terrae Matri (H)erecurae Matri deum Magnae Id(a)eae Popilia M(arci) fil(ia) Maxima taurobolium aram posuit movit fecit	Thibilis (Numidia)	Terra Mater, Erecura, Magna Mater Idaea	To Terra Mater Herecura, Great Mother of the Gods of Mount Ida, Popilia Maxima, daughter of Marcus, set up, dedicated and made an altar for a taurobolium.	CIL VIII, 5524	Herecura equated with Terra Mater and the Great Mother. A taurobolium altar.
Terrae Matri (H)erecurae Matri Magnae Id(ae)ae P(ublius) Sextilius C(ai) fil(ius) Quir(ina) Honoratus taurobolium et criobolium movit et fecit aramque po(suit)	Thibilis (Numidia)	Terra Mater, Erecura, Magna Mater Idaea	To Terra Mater Herecura, Great Mother of Mount Ida, Publius Sextilius Honoratus, son of Gaius, of the Quirina tribe, performed a taurobolium and a criobolium and set up an altar.	AE 1895, 81	A second taurobolium altar from the same sanctuary, adding a criobolium.
Curse tablets (defixiones)
Pluton sive Iovem infernum dici opor(te)t, (A)eracura Iuno inferna, acciet(e) ia(m) c(e)lerius infra scri(p)tum e(t) tradite i(n) Manibus [...]	Favianae (Noricum)	Erecura (as Iuno inferna), Pluto	Pluto, or rather the infernal Jupiter, and Aeracura, the infernal Juno: summon quickly the one written below and hand him over to the Manes [...]	AE 1950, 112	A love spell. Herecura equated with the infernal Juno.
Sa(nc)te Dite Pater et Veracura (e<t> tu Eracura) et Cerbere auxili(um) qui tenes limina inferna sive superna [...]	Carnuntum (Pannonia Superior)	Dis Pater, Eracura, Cerberus	Holy Dis Pater, and Eracura, and helpful Cerberus, you who guard the thresholds below and above [...]	AE 1929, 228	The name has traditionnaly been read Veracura by scholars. Barta, followed by Németh, sees an omitted T and rectifies et Veracura to e<t> tu Eracura. (Note: Kropp believes that Veracura is the transcription of a Greek theonym Hera kyría understood orally.)
Ito Pater, (Ae)racura! Mercuri Cylleni, ea nomina tibi dicto, tradas diris canibus! Di Manes Tartaris! [...]	Aquincum (Pannonia Inferior)	Dis Pater, Erecura, Mercurius Cyllenius	Dis Pater, Aeracura! Mercurius Cyllenius, I dictate these names to you: hand them over to the dreadful dogs! Infernal Manes in Tartarus! [...]	AE 2015, 1116	A judicial curse. The "dreadful dogs" are Cerberus. The name is written Hracura. Németh reads the initial sign as a HE ligature, giving Heracura.
Claudia, Flavia, Zosimus (A)eracura(m) rogat et petit sibi Zosimus (D)ite Patre ea nomina qu(a)e vobis do [...]	Aquincum (Pannonia Inferior)	Erecura, Dis Pater, Mercurius	Claudia, Flavia (and) Zosimus ask Aeracura, and Zosimus for himself asks Dis Pater, (to attend to) these names which I give to you [...]	Barta 2017	A two-sided tablet. The reverse invokes Mercury to carry the cursed to Tartarus.
De(fig)o amc ea(m) re(m) impl(eb)i(t) D(is) P(at)er ad era(m) Ogm(i)us salute(m) [...]	Brigantium (Bregenz, Raetia)	Dis Pater, Era(cura), Ogmius	I bind AMC and this matter. Dis Pater and Era(cura) will carry it out. May Ogmius (take away her) health [...]	Kropp 2008, 7.1/2	A love spell that invokes the Celtic god Ogmius alongside the infernal pair.
