= Dis Pater =

Roman god of the underworld

- God of soil fertility and mineral wealth, later associated with the Underworld
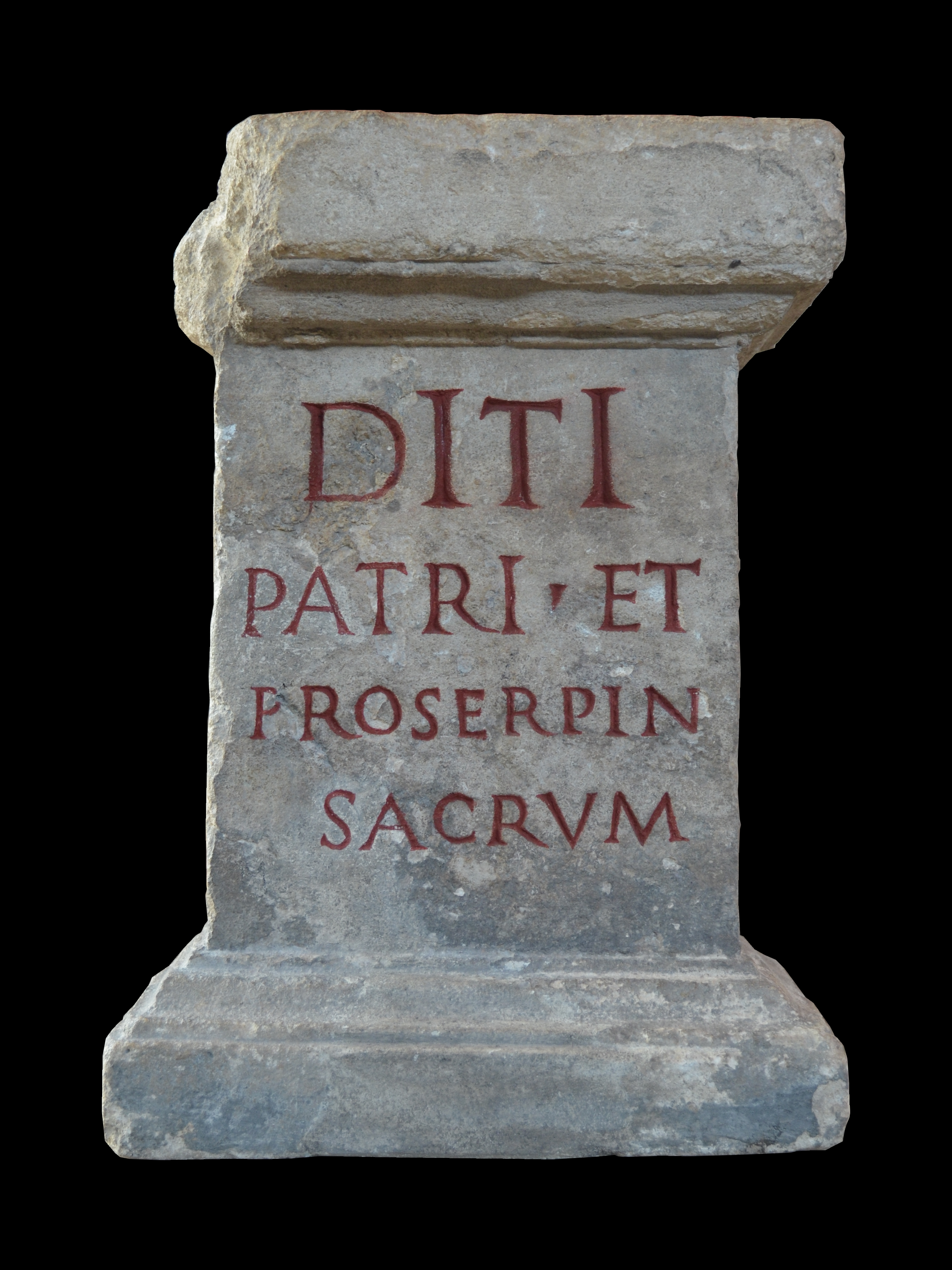
- Votive pillar reading Diti Patri et Proserpin[ae] sacrum, "Dedicated to Dis Pater and Proserpina"
- Other names: Dis
- Abode: Hades
- Parents: Saturn and Ops
- Consort: Proserpina

Equivalents
- Etruscan: Soranus
- Greek: Hades

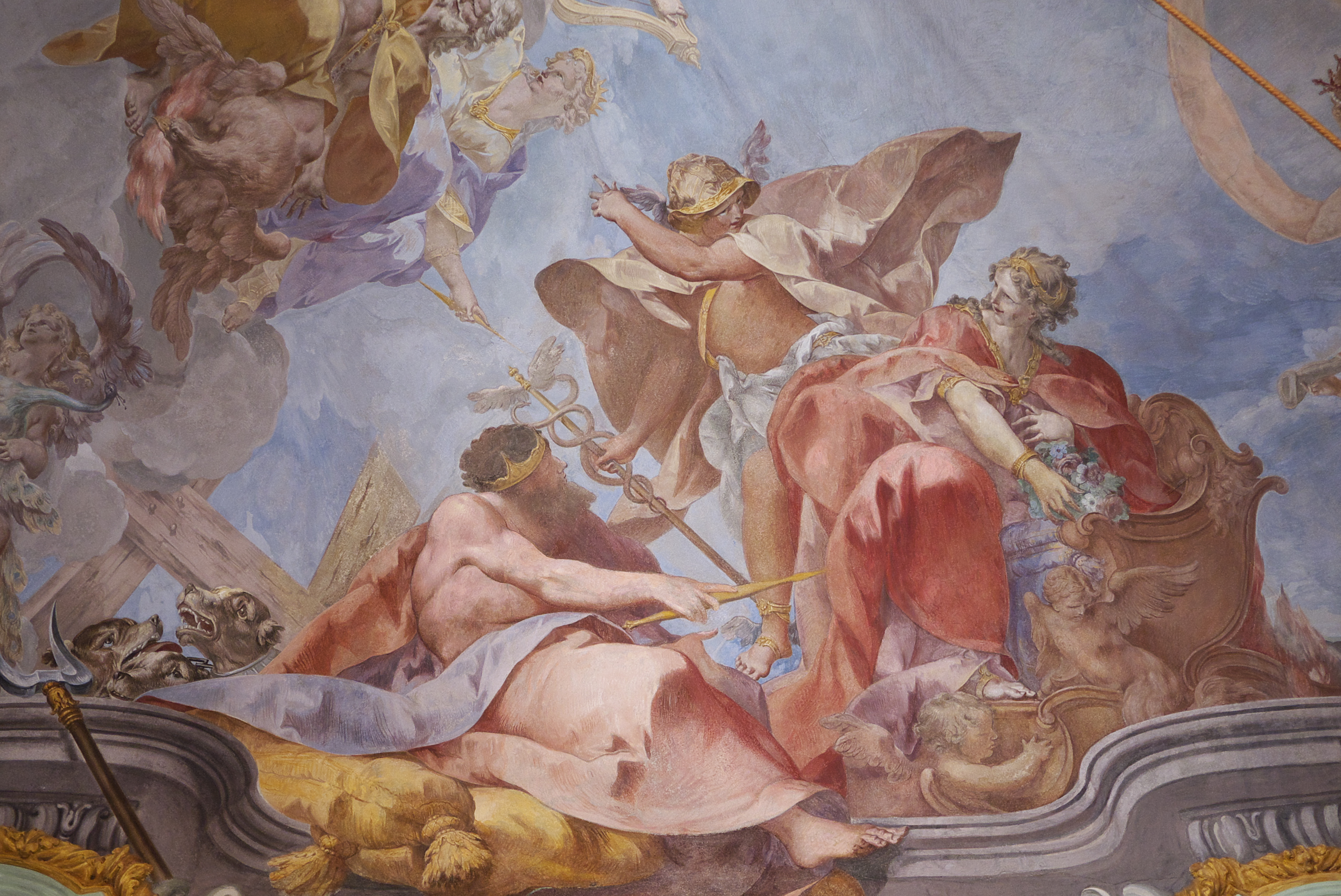
18th-century painting showing Mercury (center), Flora (right), and Dis Pater (left), from Convito per le nozze di Amore e Psiche (The Wedding Feast of Cupid and Psyche), Galleria Nazionale di Palazzo Spinola, Genoa

Dis Pater (/ˌdɪs ˈpeɪtər/; Latin: [diːs patɛr]; genitive Ditis Patris, lit. the "Rich Patriarch"), otherwise known as Rex Infernus or Pluto, is a Roman god of the underworld. Dis was originally associated with fertile agricultural land and mineral wealth, and since those minerals came from underground, he was later equated with the chthonic deities Pluto (Hades) and Orcus.

Dis Pater's name was commonly shortened to Dis, and this name has since become an alternative name for the underworld or a part of the underworld, such as the City of Dis of Dante's The Divine Comedy, which comprises Lower Hell.

== Etymology ==
The name Dis is a contraction of the Latin adjective dives ('wealthy, rich'), probably derived from divus, dius ('godlike, divine') via the form *deiu-(o)t- or *deiu-(e)t- ('who is like the gods, protected by/from the gods'). The occurrence of the deity Dis together with Pater ('father') may be due to association with Di(e)spiter (Jupiter).

Cicero gave a similar etymology in De Natura Deorum, suggesting the meaning 'father of riches', and comparing the deity to the Greek name Pluto (Plouton, Πλούτων), meaning "the rich one", a title bestowed upon the Greek god Hades.

== Mythology ==
Dis Pater eventually became associated with death and the underworld because mineral wealth such as gems and precious metals came from underground, wherein lies the realm of the dead, i.e. Hades' (Pluto's) domain.

In being conflated with Pluto, Dis Pater took on some of the latter's mythological attributes, being one of the three sons of Saturn (Greek Cronus) and Ops (Greek Rhea), along with Jupiter (Greek Zeus) and Neptune (Greek Poseidon). He ruled the underworld and the dead beside his wife, Proserpina (Greek Persephone). In literature, Dis Pater's name was commonly used as a symbolic and poetic way of referring to death itself.

Dis Pater was sometimes identified with the Sabine god Soranus. Julius Caesar, in his Commentaries on the Gallic Wars (VI:18), states that the Gauls all claimed descent from Dis Pater. This is an example of interpretatio romana: what Caesar meant was that the Gauls all claimed descent from a Gaulish god that he equated with the Roman Dis Pater. The identification of Gaulish Dis Pater has posed problems for scholars.

A scholium on the Pharsalia equates Dis Pater with Taranis, the Gaulish god of thunder. In southern Germany and the Balkans, Aericura was considered a consort of Dis Pater.

== Worship ==
In 249 BC and 207 BC, the Roman Senate under senator Lucius Catellius ordained special festivals to appease Dis Pater and Proserpina. Every hundred years, a festival was celebrated in his name. According to legend, a round marble altar, Altar of Dis Pater and Proserpina (Latin: Ara Ditis Patris et Proserpinae), was miraculously discovered by the servants of a Sabine called Valesius, the ancestor of the first consul. The servants were digging in the Tarentum on the edge of the Campus Martius to lay foundations following instructions given to Valesius's children in dreams, when they found the altar 20 feet (6 m) underground. Valesius reburied the altar after three days of games. Sacrifices were offered to this altar during the Ludi Saeculares or Ludi Tarentini. It may have been uncovered for each occasion of the games, to be reburied afterwards, a clearly chthonic tradition of worship. It was rediscovered in 1886–1887 beneath the Corso Vittorio Emanuele in Rome.

== See also ==
- Crom (fictional deity)
- Demeter
- Dievas
- Dis (Divine Comedy)
- Dyaus Pita
- Dyēus
- God the Father
- Hades
- Tiwaz
- Zeus
