= Francesca da Rimini and Paolo Malatesta Appraised by Dante and Virgil =

Painting by Ary Scheffer

Francesca da Rimini and Paolo Malatesta appraised by Dante and Virgil
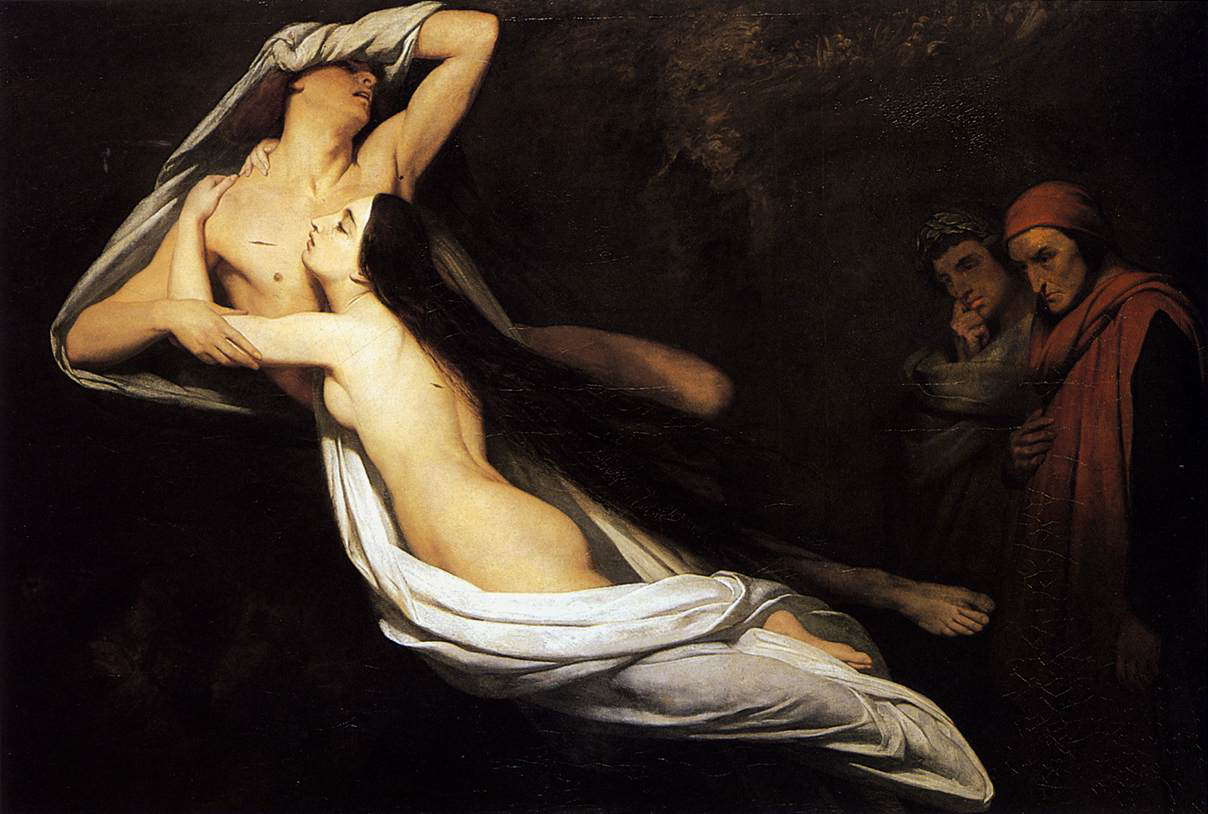
- Artist: Ary Scheffer
- Year: 1835
- Dimensions: 58.2 cm × 80.5 cm (22.9 in × 31.7 in)
- Location: The Wallace Collection; London

Francesca da Rimini and Paolo Malatesta appraised by Dante and Virgil (and several variant titles) is a composition painted in at least six very similar versions by Ary Scheffer between 1822 and 1855; all are in oils on canvas. The paintings show a scene from Dante's Inferno, of Dante and Virgil in the shadows to the right viewing the murdered lovers Francesca da Rimini and Paolo Malatesta in Hell. It "could be described as Scheffer's best work".

== Background ==
In the first volume, Inferno, of The Divine Comedy, Dante and Virgil meet Francesca and her lover Paolo in the second circle of hell, reserved for the lustful.

Da Rimini's father had forced her to marry the lame Giovanni Malatesta for political reasons, but she fell in love with Giovanni's brother Paolo. The pair carried on a love affair for many years; but when Giovanni caught them kissing, he killed them with his sword. The painting shows wounds on Paolo's chest and on Francesca's back from the stabbing.

The couple are trapped in an eternal whirlwind, doomed to be forever swept through the air just as they allowed themselves to be swept away by their passions. Dante calls out to the lovers, who are compelled to briefly pause before him, and he speaks with Francesca. She obliquely states a few of the details of her life and her death, and Dante, apparently familiar with her story, correctly identifies her by name. He asks her what led to her and Paolo's damnation, and Francesca's story strikes such a chord within Dante that he faints out of pity. The pair, depicted either during their life or following Dante, became a very popular subject in 19th-century art.

== Versions ==
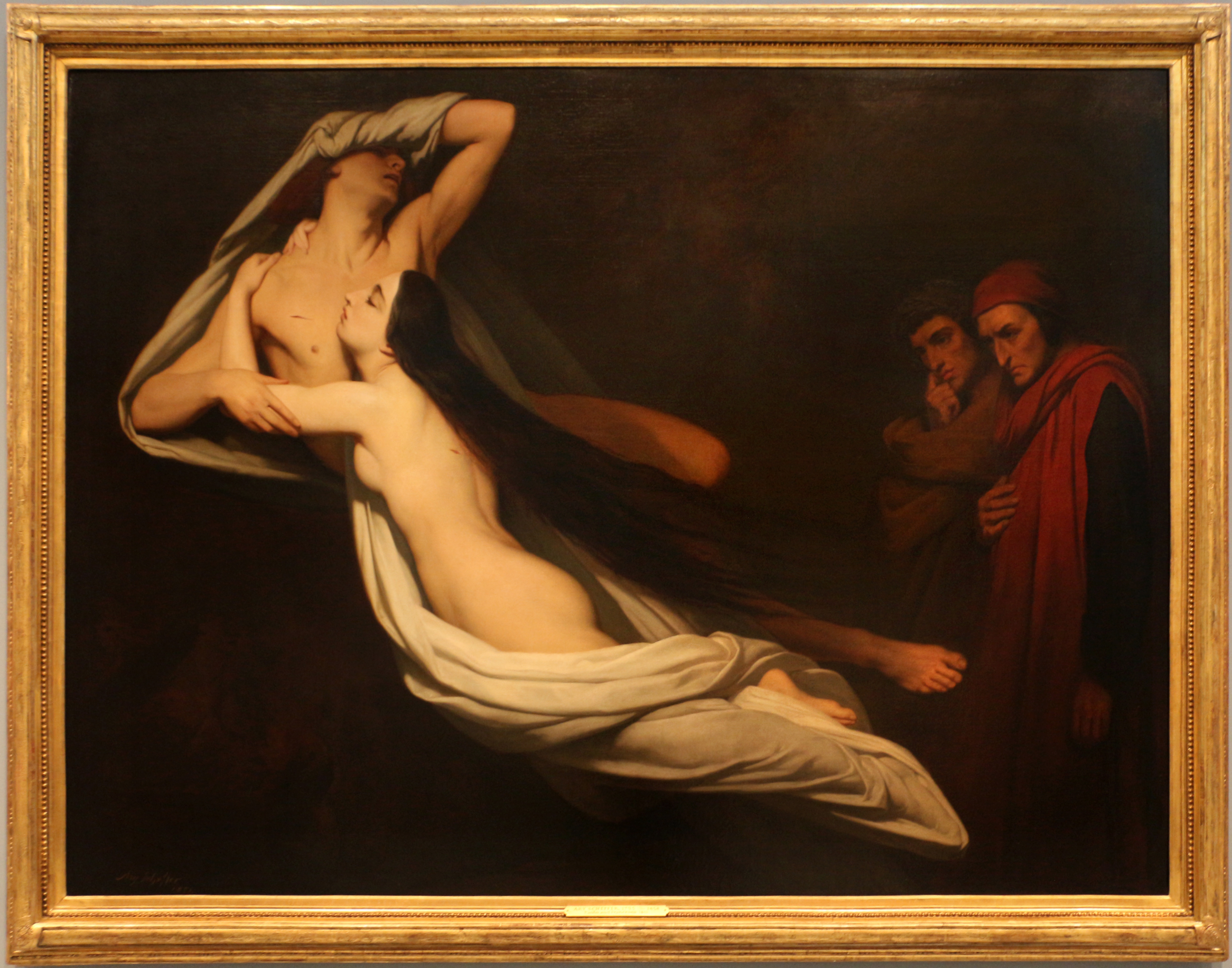
Pittsburgh version, 1851

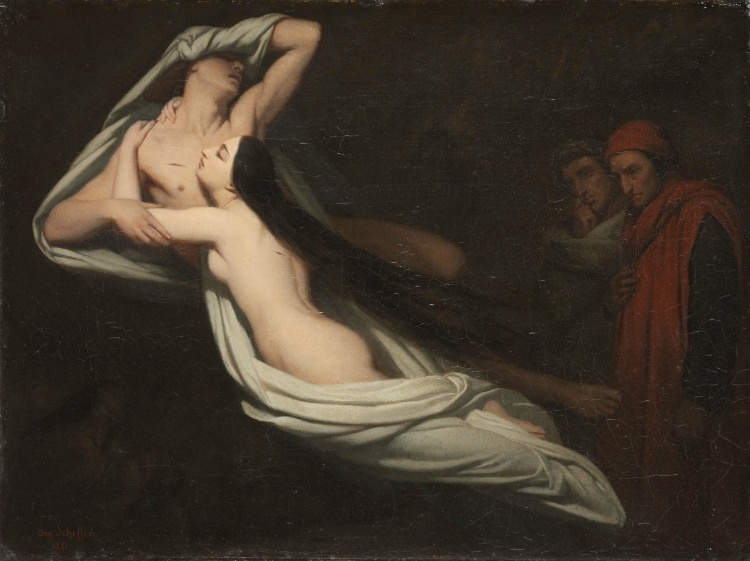
Cleveland version, 1851

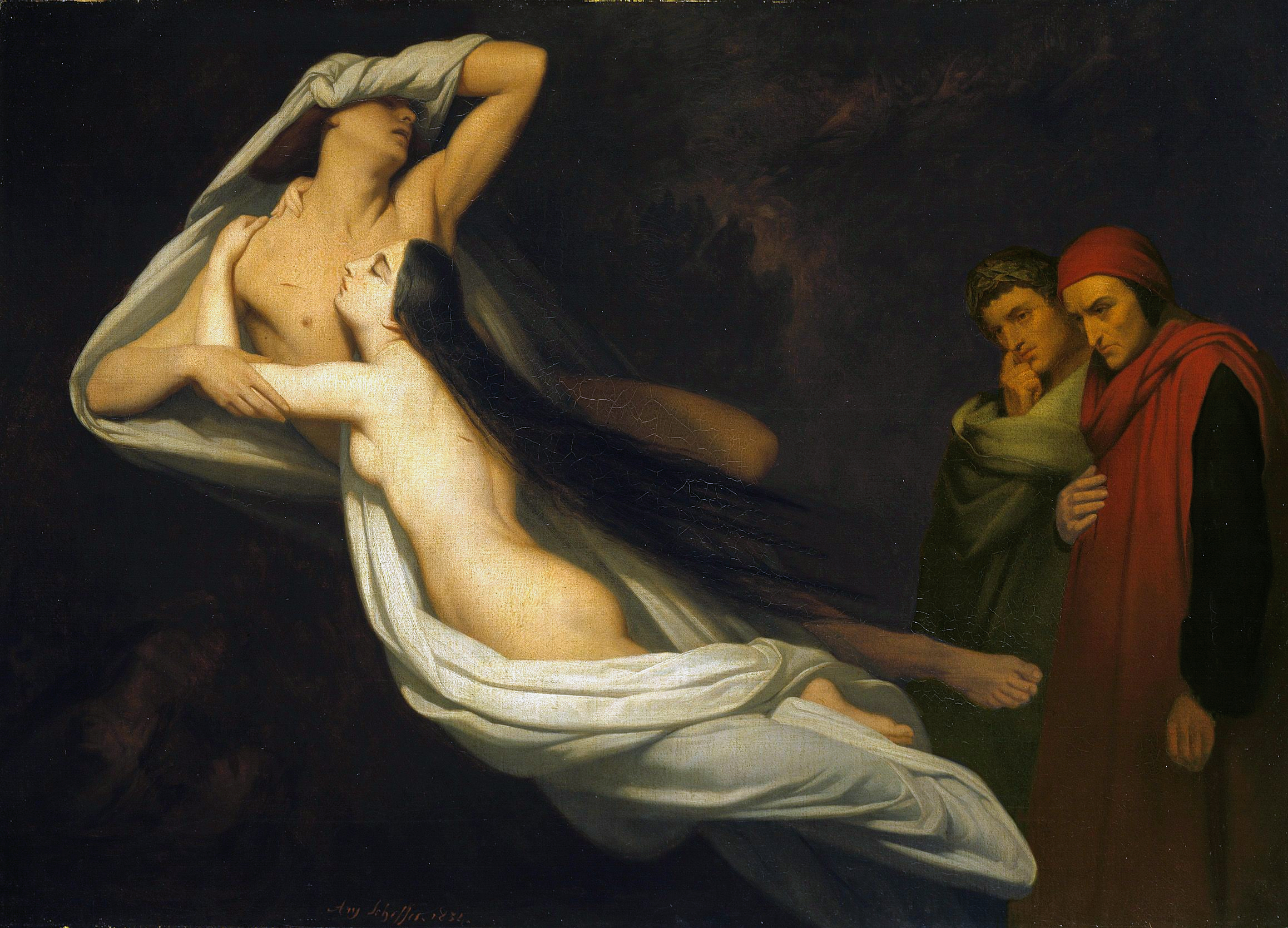
Hamburg version, 1854

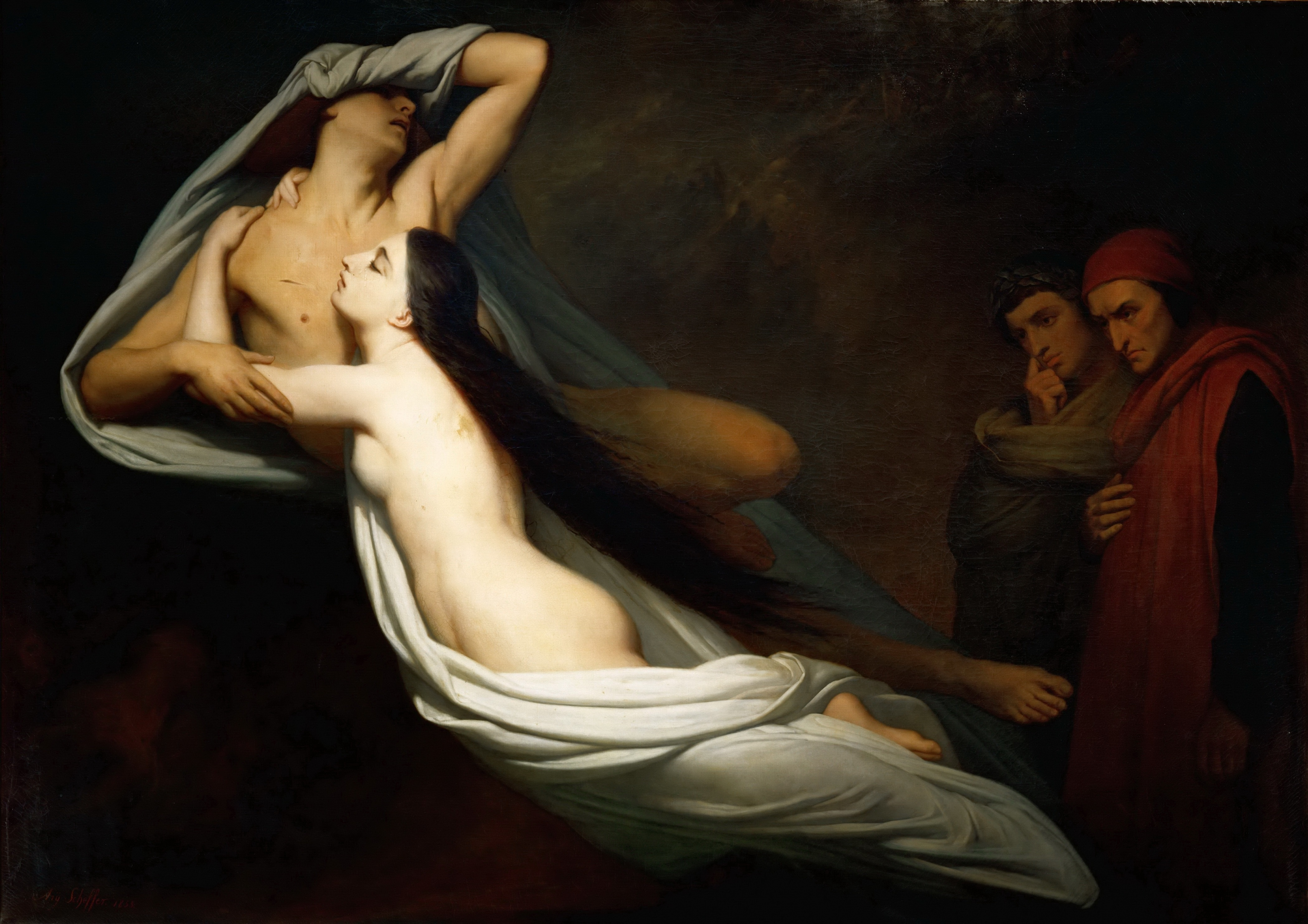
Louvre version, 1855

Like some other artists, for example William Powell Frith, Scheffer got in the habit of repeating his most successful paintings in smaller versions later in life, as his more recent works became less successful, and his role as a court painter was lost after the French Revolution of 1848.

Scheffer first exhibited a painting of Paolo and Francesca at the Paris Salon of 1822. Although well received, it was overshadowed by The Barque of Dante, the first major painting by Eugène Delacroix, which was exhibited in the same room. The current location of Scheffer's first painting of this subject is not known.

The prime version was painted in 1835 and measures 166.5 by 234 centimetres (65.6 by 92.1 in). Considered Scheffer's best version of the subject, it was acquired in 1835 by Ferdinand Philippe, Duke of Orléans, inherited in 1842 by his wife Hélène, duchesse d'Orléans, and sold in Paris in January 1853 to Anatoly Nikolaievich Demidov, 1st Prince of San Donato. A heavily decorated frame, probably designed by Félicie de Fauveau, was added while it was in the Demidoff collection. It was sold again in Paris in February 1870, bought by Richard Seymour-Conway, 4th Marquess of Hertford, and inherited by his illegitimate son Sir Richard Wallace, 1st Baronet. The work is now in the Wallace Collection in London.

The Carnegie Museum of Art in Pittsburgh has a second full-size version from 1851 which measures 172.7 by 240 cm (68.0 by 94.5 in), which it acquired in 2015. Another much smaller version from 1851 measuring 24.7 by 33.2 centimetres (9.7 by 13.1 in) hangs at the Cleveland Museum of Art, Ohio. It was acquired by the CMA in 1980, after passing through the hands of several collectors in London in the previous century.

Another smaller version dated 1854, measuring 51.7 by 81.3 centimetres (20.4 by 32.0 in), is in the Hamburger Kunsthalle. A third full-size version of 1855 is now in the Louvre in Paris; measuring 171 by 239 cm (67 by 94 in), it was acquired in 1900 from the estate of the artist's sister, Cornélia Scheffer.

Various titles are used for the different versions of the painting:

- Just Francesca da Rimini today at the Wallace Collection
- The Ghosts/Shades/Shadows of Francesca de Rimini and Paolo Malatesta Appear to Dante and Virgil by various sources, especially of the Hamburg and Paris versions.
- Dante and Virgil Encountering the Shades of Francesca da Rimini and Paolo Malatesta in the Underworld in Pittsburgh
- Dante and Virgil Meeting the Shades of Francesca da Rimini and Paolo in Cleveland
- Les ombres de Francesca da Rimini et de Paolo Malatesta apparaissent à Dante et à Virgile by the Louvre.
