= The Barque of Dante =

1822 painting by Eugène Delacroix

- La barque de Dante (French)
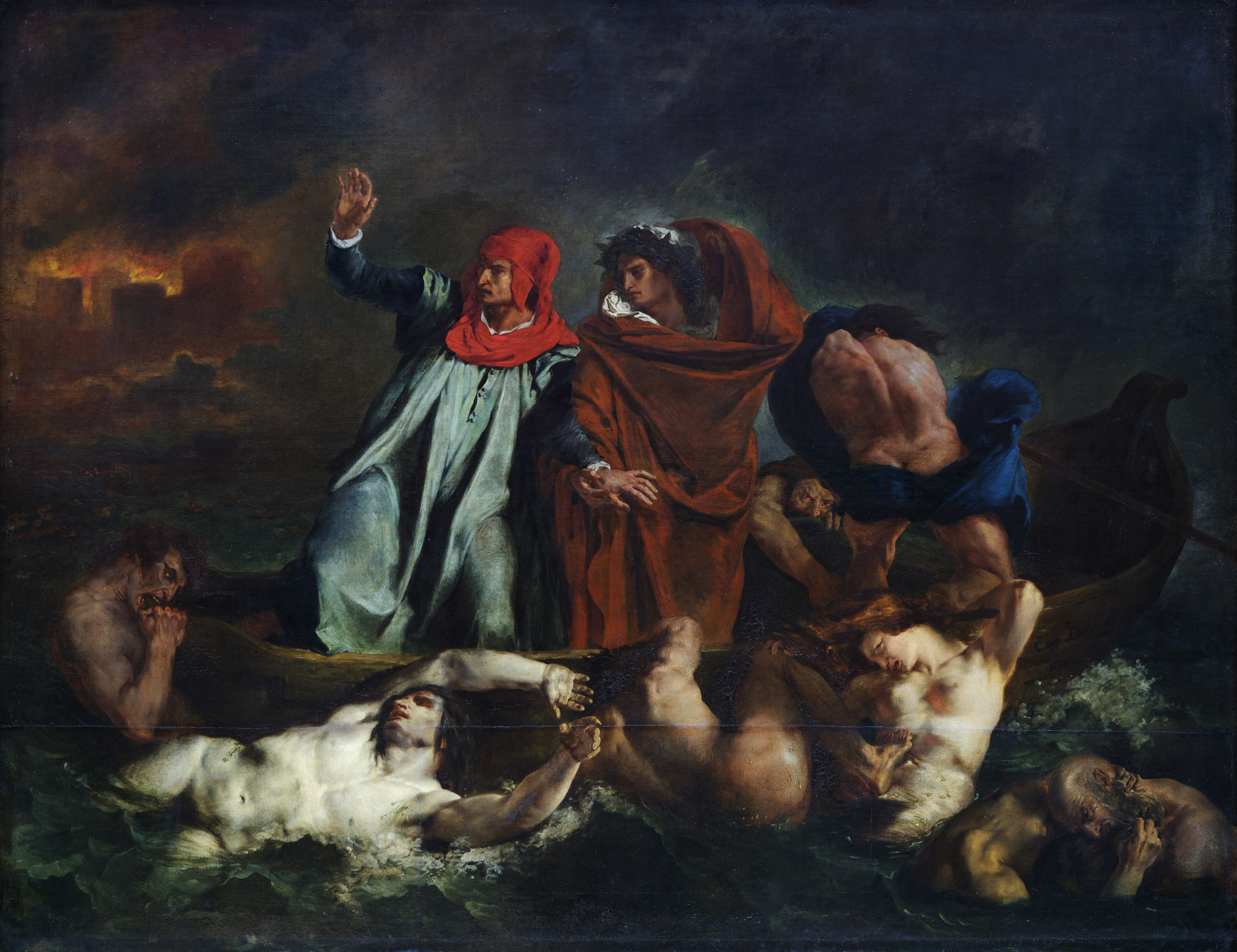
- Artist: Eugène Delacroix
- Year: 1822
- Medium: Oil on canvas
- Movement: Romanticism
- Subject: Canto VIII of Inferno
- Dimensions: 189.0 cm × 241.5 cm (74.4 in × 95.1 in)
- Location: Louvre, Paris

The Barque of Dante (French: La barque de Dante), also known as Dante and Virgil (French: Dante et Virgile), is an 1822 oil painting by the French artist Eugène Delacroix, now in the Louvre. The painting is based on Canto VIII of Dante Alighieri's poem Inferno, depicting Dante and his companion Virgil crossing the river Styx on Phlegyas's boat, onto which damned souls cling.

The Barque of Dante was Delacroix's first publicly exhibited picture, and his first entry to the Paris Salon. Delacroix had long been interested in the works of Dante, and had previously drawn an illustration depicting the same subject as The Barque of Dante. After considering another subject, Delacroix settled on a passage from Inferno that was relatively unknown in France. Delacroix worked on the painting intensively for two and a half months, finishing it a just few days before the Salon. It received a mixed reception at the Salon: while many praised the painting, such as Antoine-Jean Gros's favorable comparison to the work of Peter Paul Rubens, others critiqued its loose composition. Despite these criticisms, the The Barque of Dante was purchased from the Salon by the French state for 2,000 francs and placed in Paris's Musée du Luxembourg, guaranteeing its eventual transfer to the Louvre after Delacroix's death.

The figures in the painting were developed from advanced studies, likely of a single model who performed poses inspired by the works of Michelangelo, Rubens, and various other artists. Delacroix scholars have debated the sources and originality of the colors in the painting, with significant comparison having been drawn to Théodore Géricault's The Raft of the Medusa. Delacroix's depiction of water droplets using unmixed, vibrant colors was a significant innovation, and an early example of Delacroix's interest in a "rational" analysis of color.

== History ==
=== Creation ===
The Barque of Dante, also known as Dante and Virgil, is an 1822 oil painting by the French artist Eugène Delacroix, measuring 189.0 by 241.5 centimetres (74.4 in × 95.1 in). It was the first painting that Delacroix exhibited publicly and the first he submitted to the Paris Salon, at the time the world's foremost regular art exhibition. Delacroix had been suffering from financial issues. While he earned some money by designing machines, drawing political cartoons, and painting fine art commissions such as Virgin of the Sacred Heart, they were not enough to cover the cost of attending the École des Beaux-Arts or studying under his master Pierre-Narcisse Guérin. A purchase of his art by the state at the Salon would improve this financial situation. He had shown interest in the Salon of 1822 as early as July 26, 1821, when he wrote to his sister stating his intention to submit a painting depicting the ongoing Greek War of Independence, mentioning this subject again in a letter on September 15 to his friend. This would have been a provocative subject, as while France's liberal faction supported the Greeks, the French government was apprehensive of the conflict. Even if it was purchased by the state, political changes may have kept it from public display. Delacroix eventually abandoned the idea of portraying the conflict.

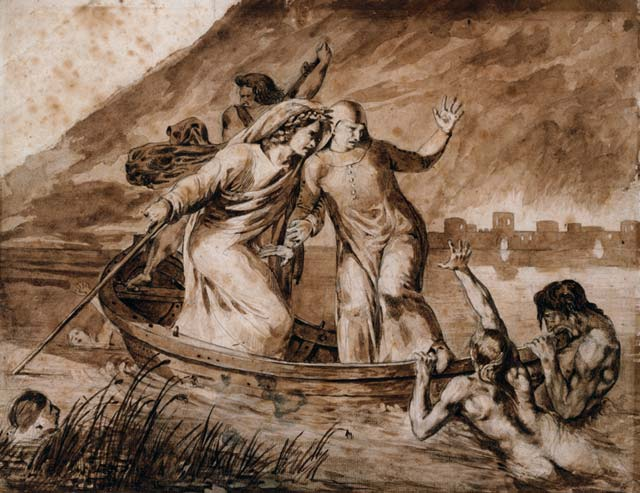
Delacroix's probable 1820 drawing of Dante

Delacroix had long possessed an interest in the works of the Italian poet Dante, whose poem The Divine Comedy describes the journey of Dante and his companion Virgil through Hell, Purgatory and Heaven. From Inferno – The Divine Comedy's first part covering the journey through Hell – Delacroix copied lines into his school notebooks, translated lines, and drew several sketches of scenes from its cantos. In 1820, while staying with his sister in the Boixe Forest, he experienced a feverish episode, during which he drew an illustration of Dante. Delacroix scholar Lee Johnson believes this to be a complex washed illustration currently held in the National Gallery of Canada. The illustration depicts the same subject as The Barque of Dante, and contains enough similarities for Johnson to consider it a study for the final painting.

By January 16, 1822, Delacroix had begun work on The Barque of Dante, referencing his earlier drawing in a letter to his sister. The chosen scene was from Canto VIII of Inferno, in which Dante and his companion Virgil cross the River Styx on Phlegyas's boat. A damned man clings onto the boat and interrogates Dante, before Virgil pushes the man back into the river. Other damned then emerge and assault the boat. Dante hears screams of anguish, first from the damned, identifying the man as Filippo Argenti, and then from the burning City of Dis, causing Dante to lean forwards in awe. The latter screams prompt Dante to notice the approaching city. This passage was not well known in France, where artists were more familiar with elements such as Paolo and Francesca or Ugolino's story. For the next two and a half months Delacroix worked intensively on the painting, eventually finishing it by April 15. Before submitting it to the Salon, he showed it to his master Guérin, who criticized the painting and did not believe it should be exhibited. The Salon accepted the painting, and since Delacroix did not have the money to purchase a suitable frame the artist and judge Antoine-Jean Gros sent the canvas to his own frame maker.

=== Exhibition ===
The entry for Dante and Virgil in the Salon of 1822's catalogue

The Salon opened on April 24, and professors from the École des Beaux-Arts soon took note of The Barque of Dante, though their reactions were mixed. Antoine-Jean Gros called it "du Rubens châtié" ('A chastised Rubens'), a positive comparison to the artist Peter Paul Rubens. Lee Johnson believes that many motifs from Rubens were placed in the painting, inspiring Gros's complement. Gros offered to mentor Delacroix for the Prix de Rome arts scholarship, though Delacroix rejected this offer in order to take an independent path. The lawyer Adolphe Thiers, in an opinion believed to reflect that of the painter François Gérard, stated "Je ne sais quel souvenir des grands artistes me saisit a l'aspect de ce tableau" ('A certain memory of the great masters stirs within me as I gaze at this painting'). Other artists were less favorable, with both Étienne-Jean Delécluze and Charles Paul Landon deriding it for its nontraditional, loose technique. Delécluze called it a tartouillade, a colloquial term for a painting that sacrificed its composition for bold colors.

On May 31, Director-General of Royal Museums comte Auguste de Forbin sent a letter to Delacroix inquiring if he may purchase the painting for the state, and if so at what price. Delacroix requested 2,400 francs (equivalent to €1,215.78 in 2025), though he left the final price to Forbin, who paid 2,000 francs (equivalent to €1,013.15 in 2025). It was purchased on July 16 and placed in Paris's Musée du Luxembourg, a museum for living artists from which paintings would be transferred to the Louvre upon their artist's death. This early career success, guaranteeing that Delacroix would eventually have a work in the Louvre, greatly encouraged the artist.

By 1859, the painting was suffering from blistering paint. In December, Delacroix wrote to comte Émilien de Nieuwerkerke expressing concern that the painting may be destroyed if it was not immediately relined by adding new canvas or transferred to a new canvas entirely. He wrote again in February 1860, requesting he be the one to retouch the cracks that would form after a relining. The request was granted, and Delacroix had nearly completed the work by summer 1860 when new blisters appeared. Blisters once again formed late that year, but eventually work was finished on February 8, 1861. Delacroix's assistant Pierre Andrieu claims to have been personally entrusted with the painting's restoration, though this claim is doubtful given Delacroix's insistence that he be the one to repaint it.

In November 1874, the painting was transferred to the Louvre, several years after Delacroix's death on August 13, 1863. It currently hangs in the Denon Wing.

== Critique, interpretation, and influence ==
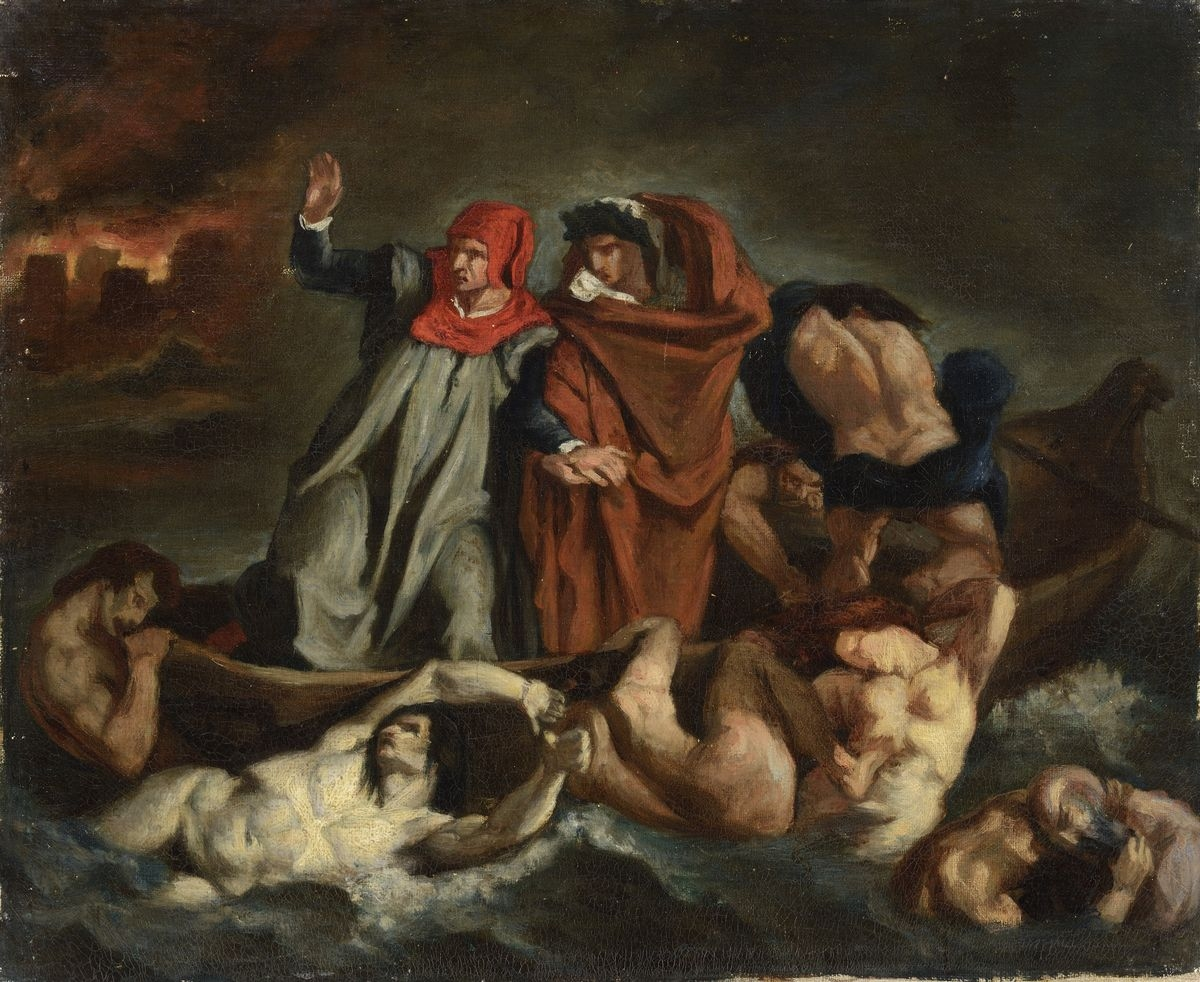
Édouard Manet's copy of The Barque of Dante

The Barque of Dante continued to receive a mixed reception from critics in the decades after its creation. At the Exposition Universelle of 1855, the critic Théophile Gautier praised the painting's evocative depiction of the terror in Inferno, while the artist Maxime Du Camp criticized Phlegias's pose for being unrealistic, calling it "a nearly systematic contempt for the precision that true masters have always respected." Fellow critic Charles Baudelaire took a more poetic, modernist approach to the painting, arguing that Delacroix cared more for the overall impression of the painting rather than detail or a strict narrative.

The art historian James H. Rubin believed that with The Barque of Dante, Delacroix was attempting to combine idealism with modernity without becoming mired in politics, particularly the increasing association between liberalism and conservatism with Romanticism and Neoclassicism. Both Dante and Michelangelo, the former the paintings subject and the latter a strong influence, were seen as successors of classic traditions while radically departing from them. Dante had come to be seen by many as a forerunner of the Romantic movement, and the influential 1817 book Histoire de la peinture en Italie Michelangelo was portrayed as the first idealist since the Classical Greek philosophers. While these topics had strong political associations, Delacroix used the literary figure Dante as his subject, shifting focus onto the artistic aspects.

The literary scholar Karlheinz Stierle observed how Delacroix adapted the sequential events of Inferno, the surfacing of the bodies, Dante's reaction to the screams coming from Dis, and then the observation of the city itself, into one self-contained moment. He also noted that Delacroix changed Dante's reaction to the screams from awe to a defensive posture, where he clings unsteadily onto Virgil. Stierle argued that that these poses highlight the fundamental relationship in The Divine Comedy between Dante's doubt and Virgil's noble self-confidence. Rubin also observed this dynamic, and argued based on Delacroix's studies that it was what the painting was build around. He states that, while artists had used this dynamic before, such as in Ary Scheffer's Francesca da Rimini and Paolo Malatesta Appraised by Dante and Virgil, The Barque of Dante was the use of it as the primary subject.

The Barque of Dante's location in the Musée du Luxembourg made it both iconic and easily accessible to 19th century painters, leading it to becoming the most copied Delacroix painting of that century. It was copied by such painters as Gustave Courbet, Paul Cézanne, and Édouard Manet. The painting was also recreated in Lars von Trier's 2018 film The House That Jack Built.

== Technique ==
=== Poses ===
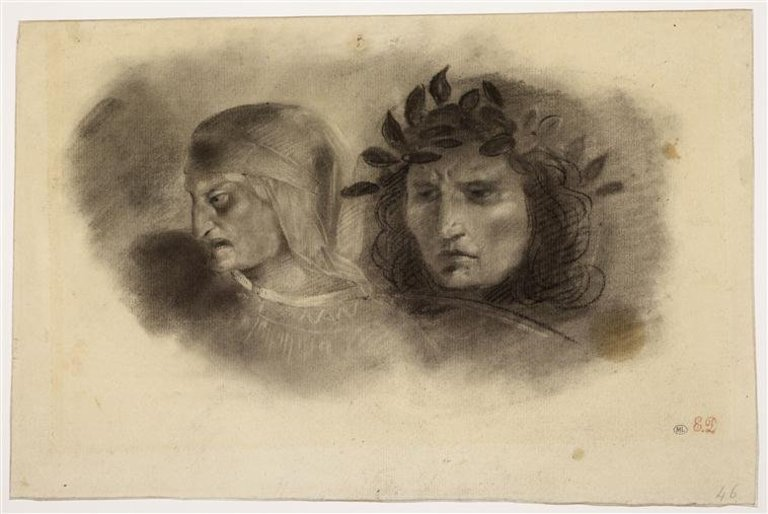
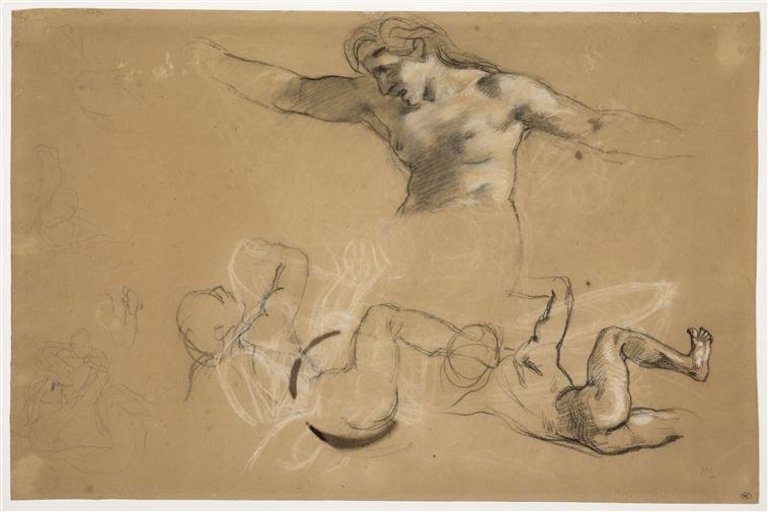
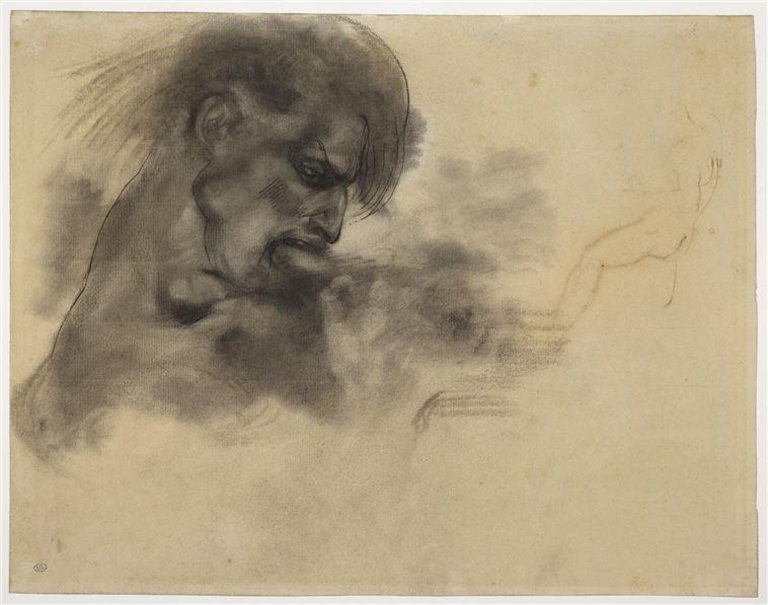
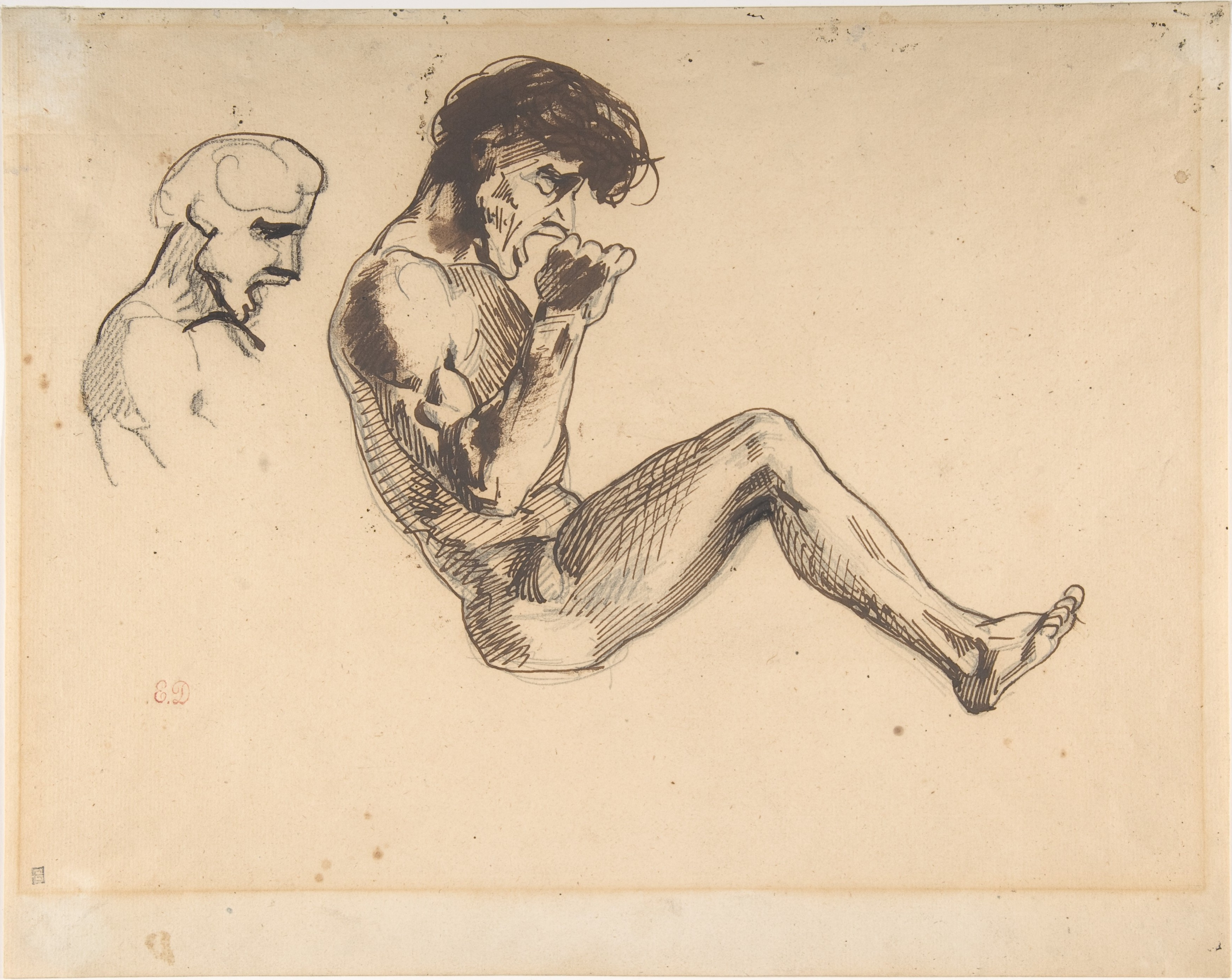
Studies for The Barque of Dante; From top to bottom, left to right:
- The heads of Dante and Virgil
- The damned woman, and central figures
- The damned man's head
- The damned man's body

Delacroix's sketches suggest that all the figures in the painting, excluding Virgil due to the lack of form under his clothing, seem to have been drawn from live models, in accordance with practice at the time. Delacroix told Andrieu that the only model he used in the painting was Martin François Suisse, a claim which is not refuted by the studies. Even the female figure seems to have been taken from a study of a male model, Delacroix simply rounding out the pectoral muscles. Johnson argued that, while none of the elements are individually original choices, their fusion together creates an energy and freshness in the painting.

==== Damned souls ====
A wide range of statues and paintings, primarily those by Michelangelo, influenced the poses in the painting. Lee Johnson noted that the woman in the foreground has a pose similar to that of Michelangelo's Night, which Delacroix might have encountered through Théodore Géricault's study, of which his own studies bear a significant resemblance. To have her holding on to the boat, her left arm is modified similarly to the ignudo holding God's right arm in The Creation of Adam, though art historian Corrado Maltese alternatively highlighted a similarity between the arm and the pose in Michelangelo's Dying Slave. Johnson contended that Delacroix made studies of the model in this pose, which were eventually used in the painting. He also proposed that the center foreground figure was developed in the same way, modeled instead on two background figures Ruben's Hero and Leander. The pose of the left foreground figure may have been inspired by the figure of Leander in this painting, but could also be the body of God's in The Creation of Adam. The head is almost certainly drawn from The Raft of the Medusa by contemporaneous artist Théodore Géricault. Johnson has also suggested that the face of the damned man in the background peering over the raft was derived from Cavalcante de' Cavalcanti in John Flaxman's engraving The Fiery Sepulchres, created as part of his illustrations of The Divine Comedy.

==== Primary figures ====
Delacroix's advanced studies of Phlegyas do not resemble the work of any other artist, though the studies were abandoned for the final painting apart from the legs. Delacroix later stated that the torso in the final painting was inspired by the Belvedere Torso. Virgil's left arm and head were derived from Michelangelo's Prophet Isaiah, though the sharp features and unusually smooth texture of the skin indicates the head was also inspired by a coin or bronze. The arrangement of intersecting folds in Dante's drapery reflects that of Michelangelo's Rachel, and his head comes from a preliminary oil study of Dante's death mask.

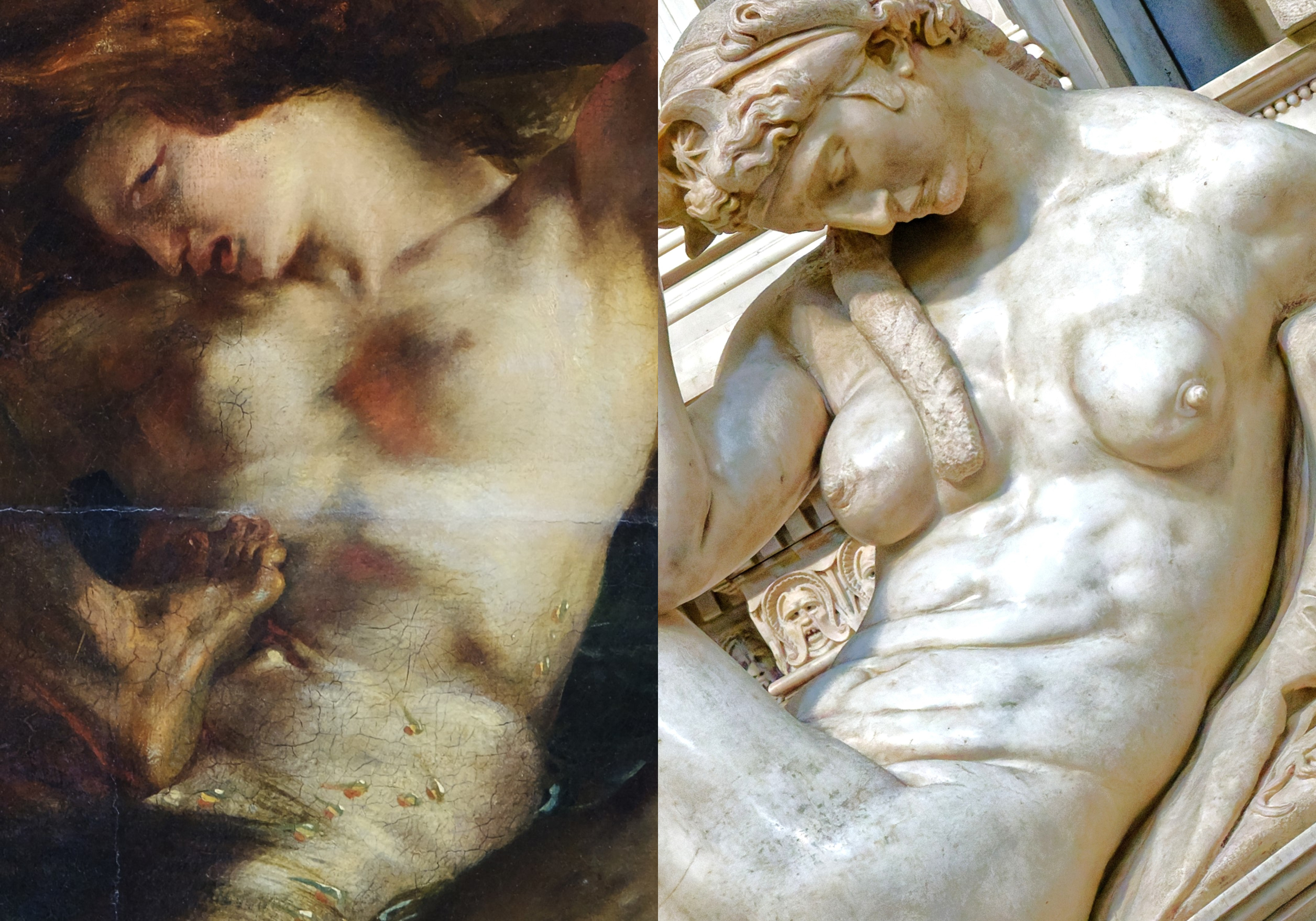
The rightmost figure and Night

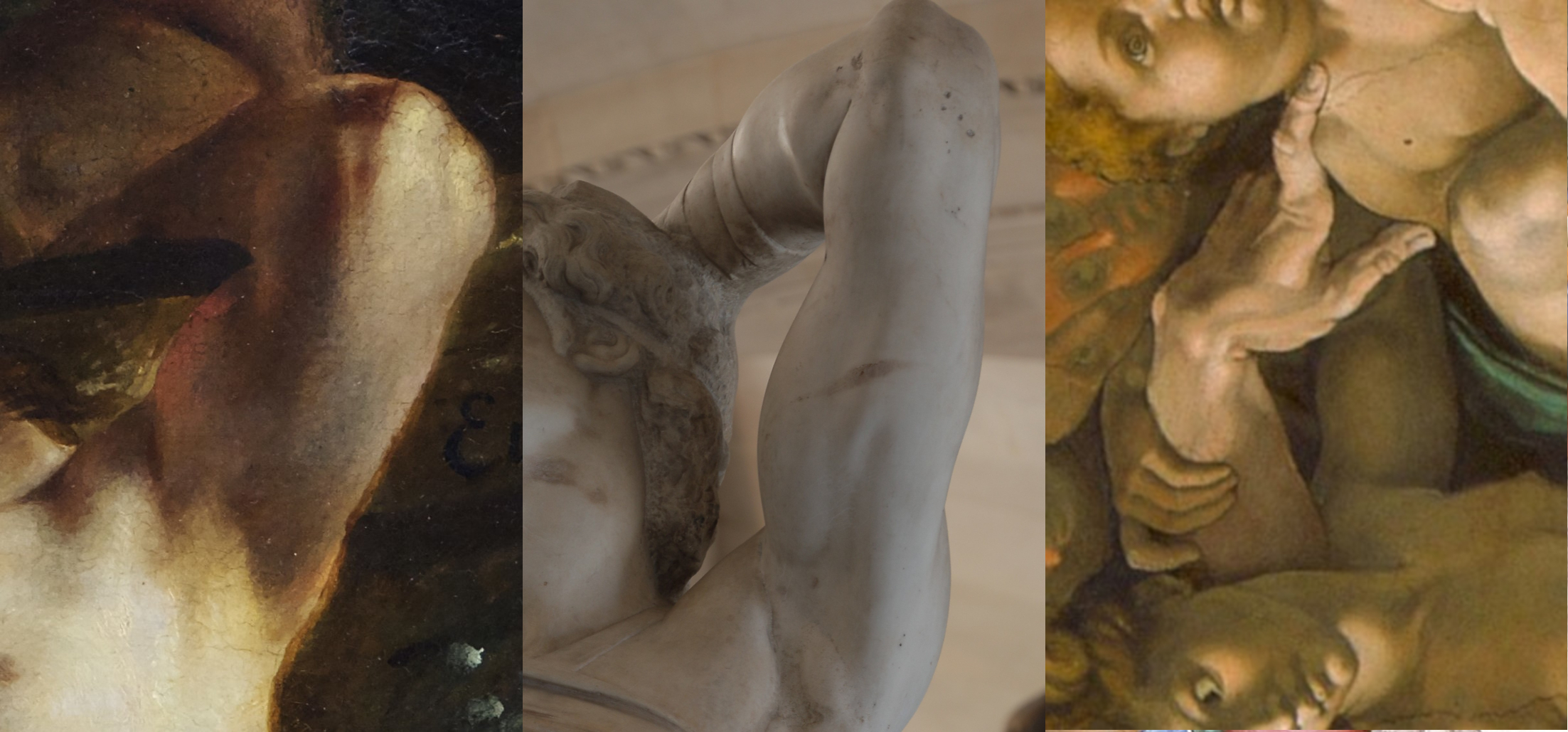
The rightmost figure's left arm, the arm of Dying Slave, and the arm of the ignudo in The Creation of Adam

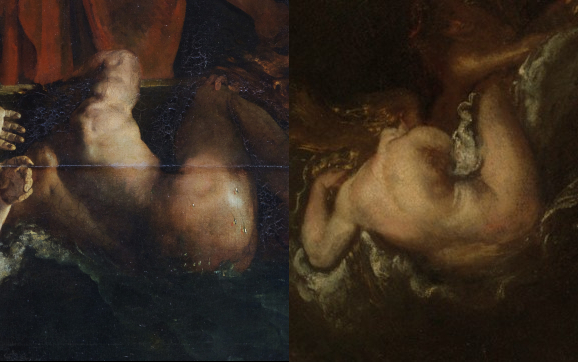
The center figure and a figure in Hero and Leander

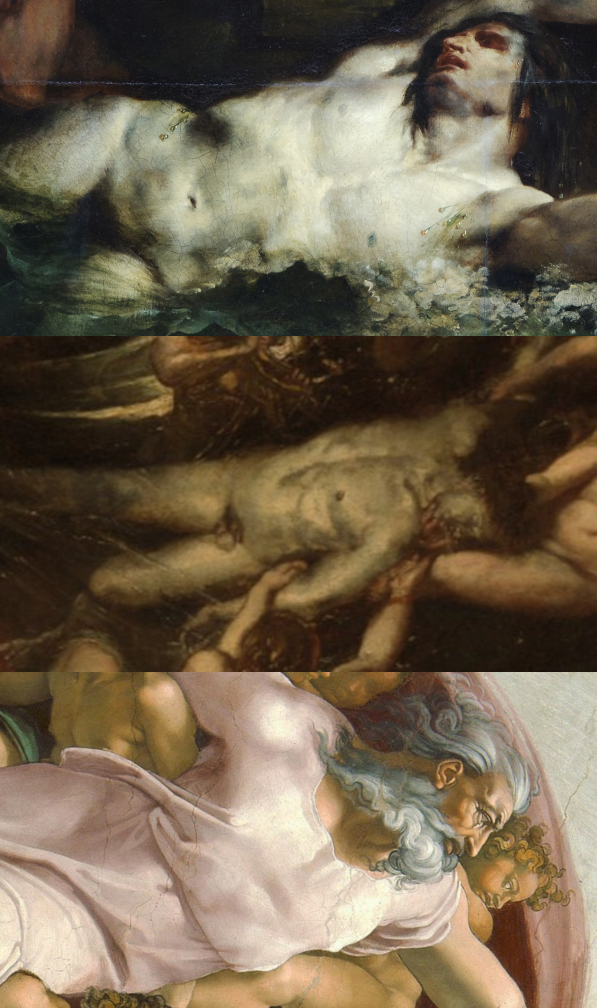
The leftmost figure, Leander in Hero and Leander, and God in The Creation of Adam

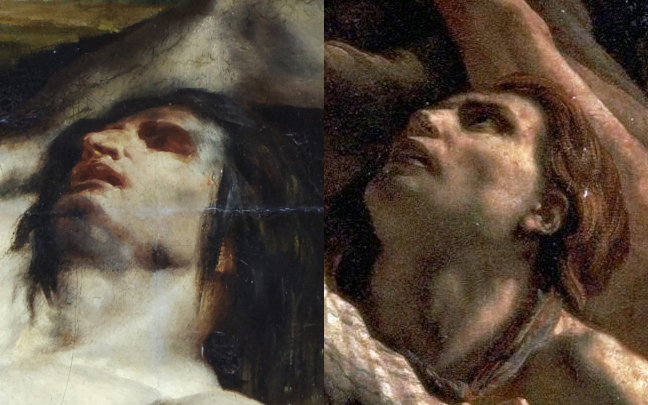
The leftmost figure's face, and the face of a figure in The Raft of the Medusa

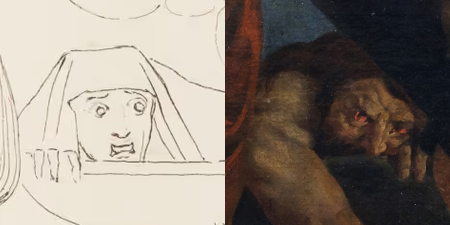
A background figure's face, and the face of Cavalcante in The Fiery Sepulchres

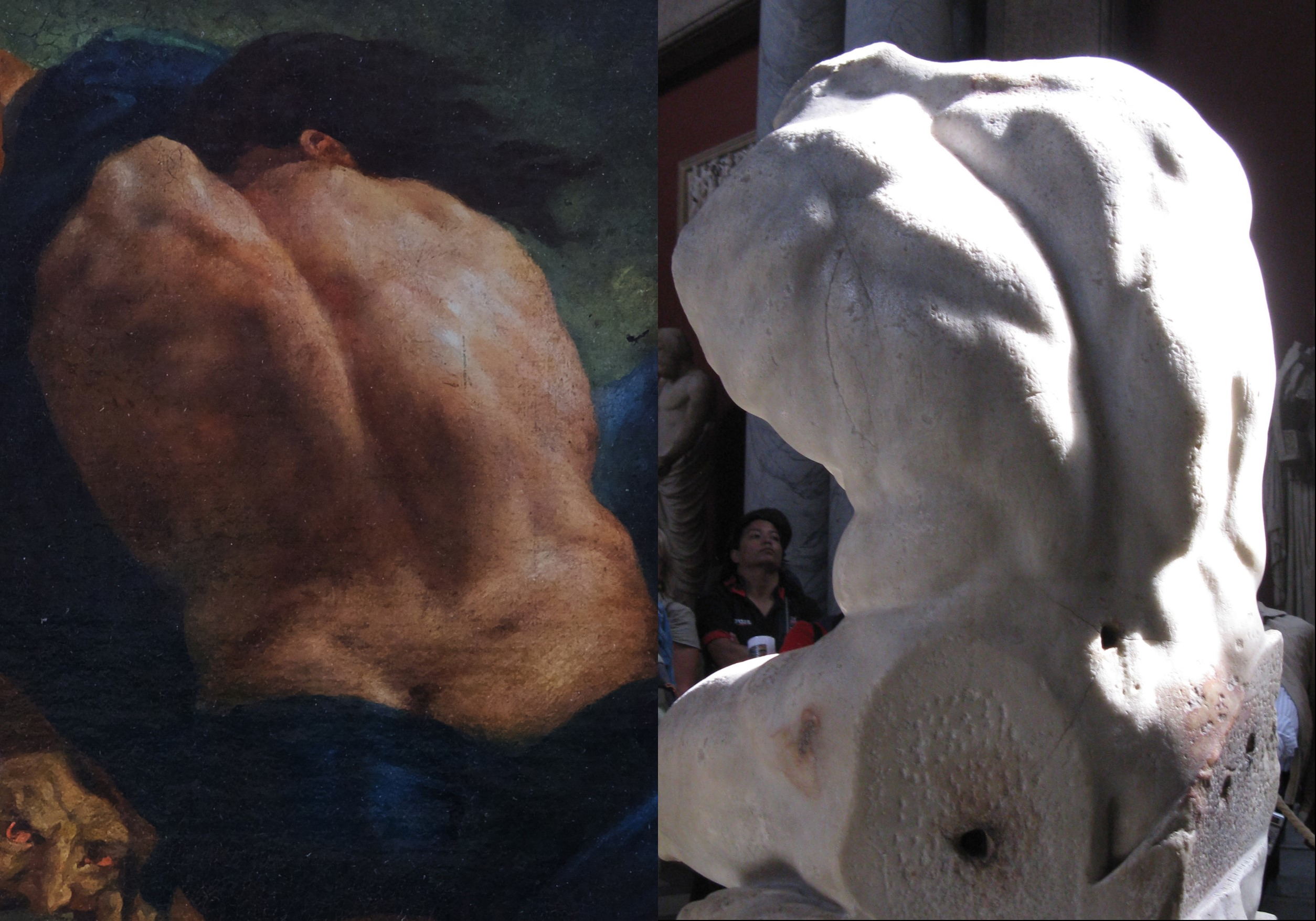
Phlegyas and the back of the Belvedere Torso

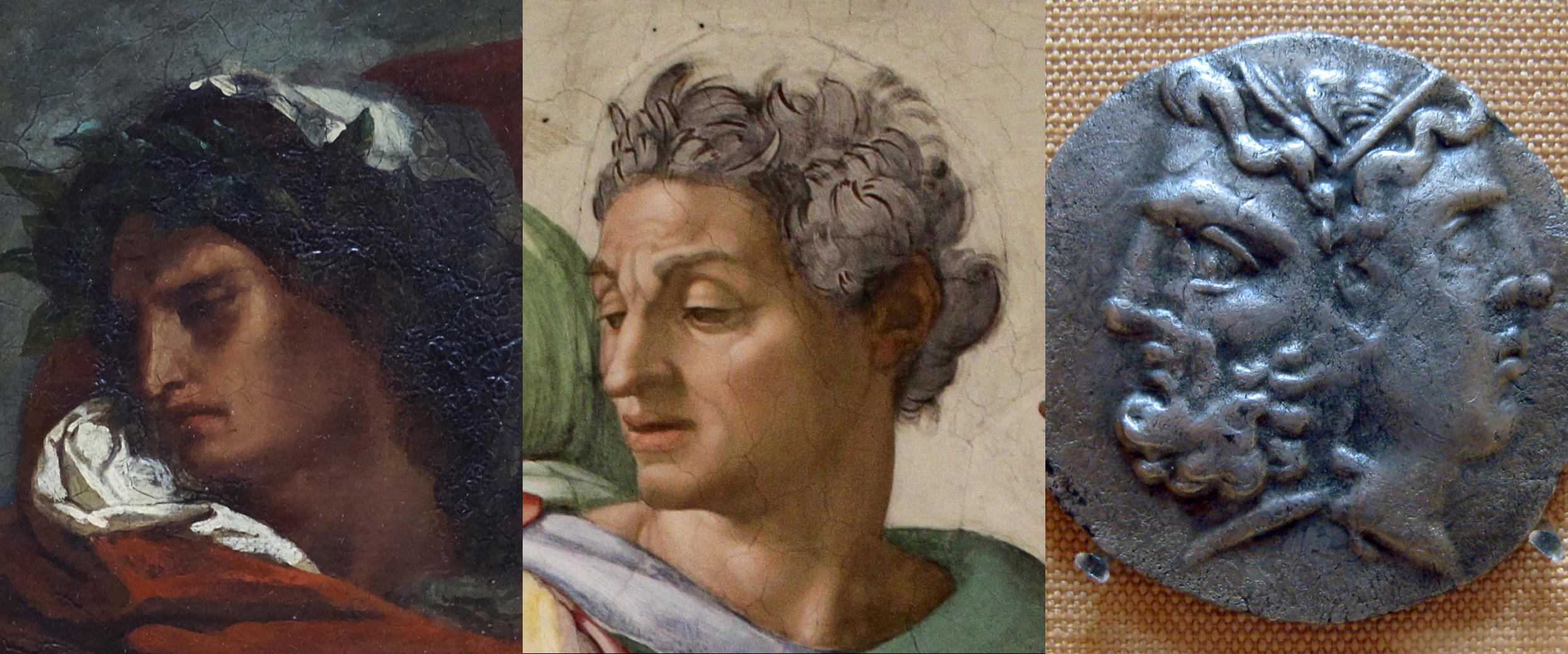
Virgil's face, the face of the Prophet Isaiah, and the face of a Janus coin

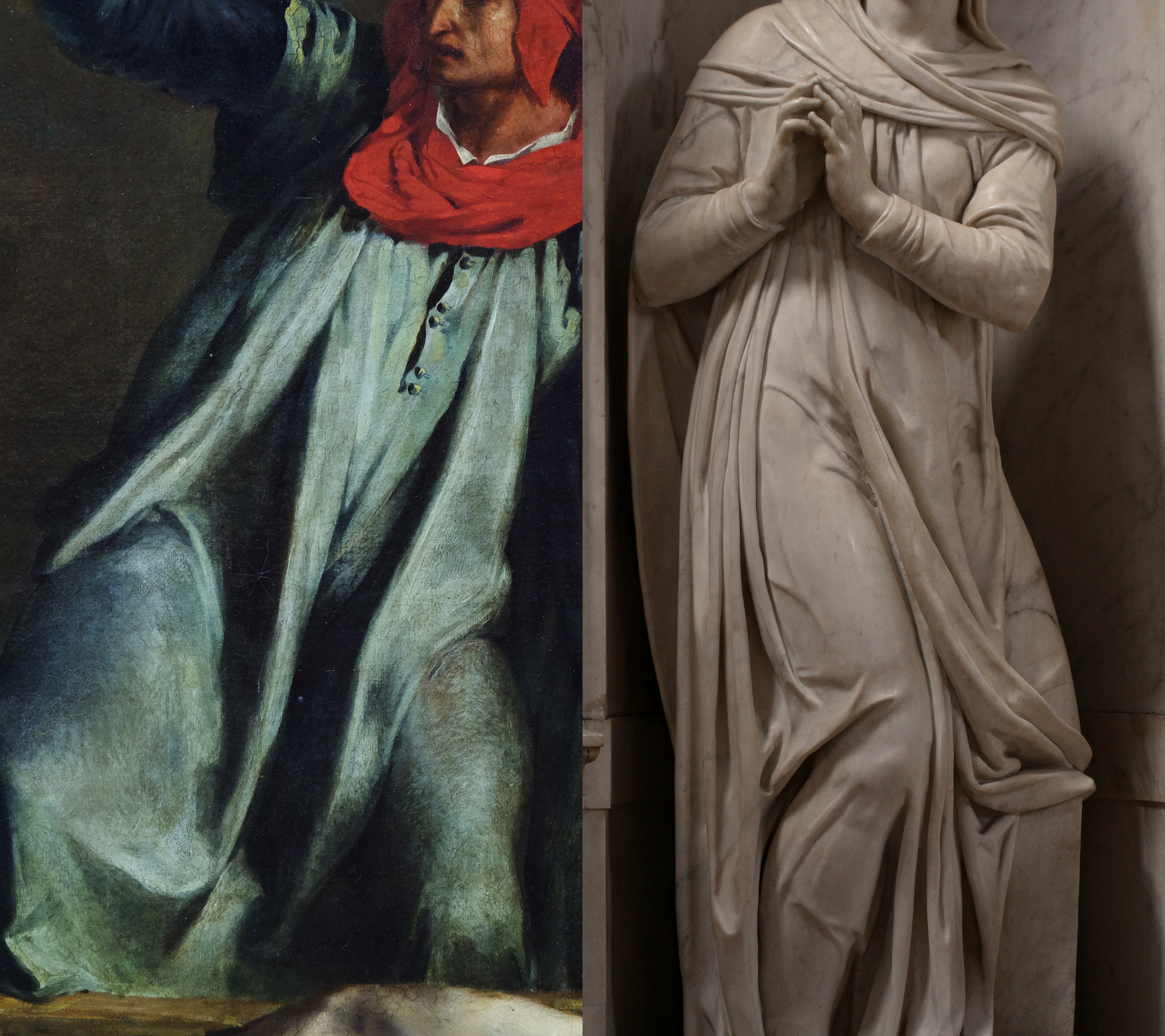
Dante's drapery and the drapery of Rachel

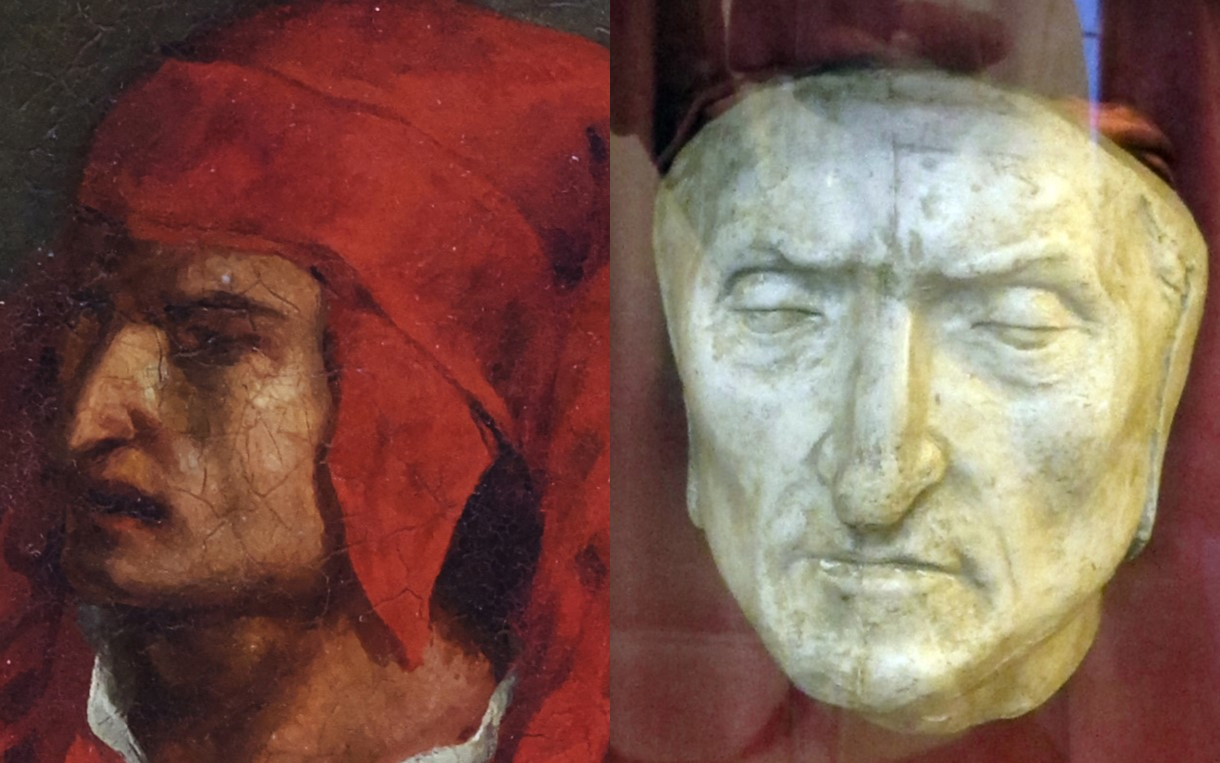
Dante's face and his death mask

=== Color ===
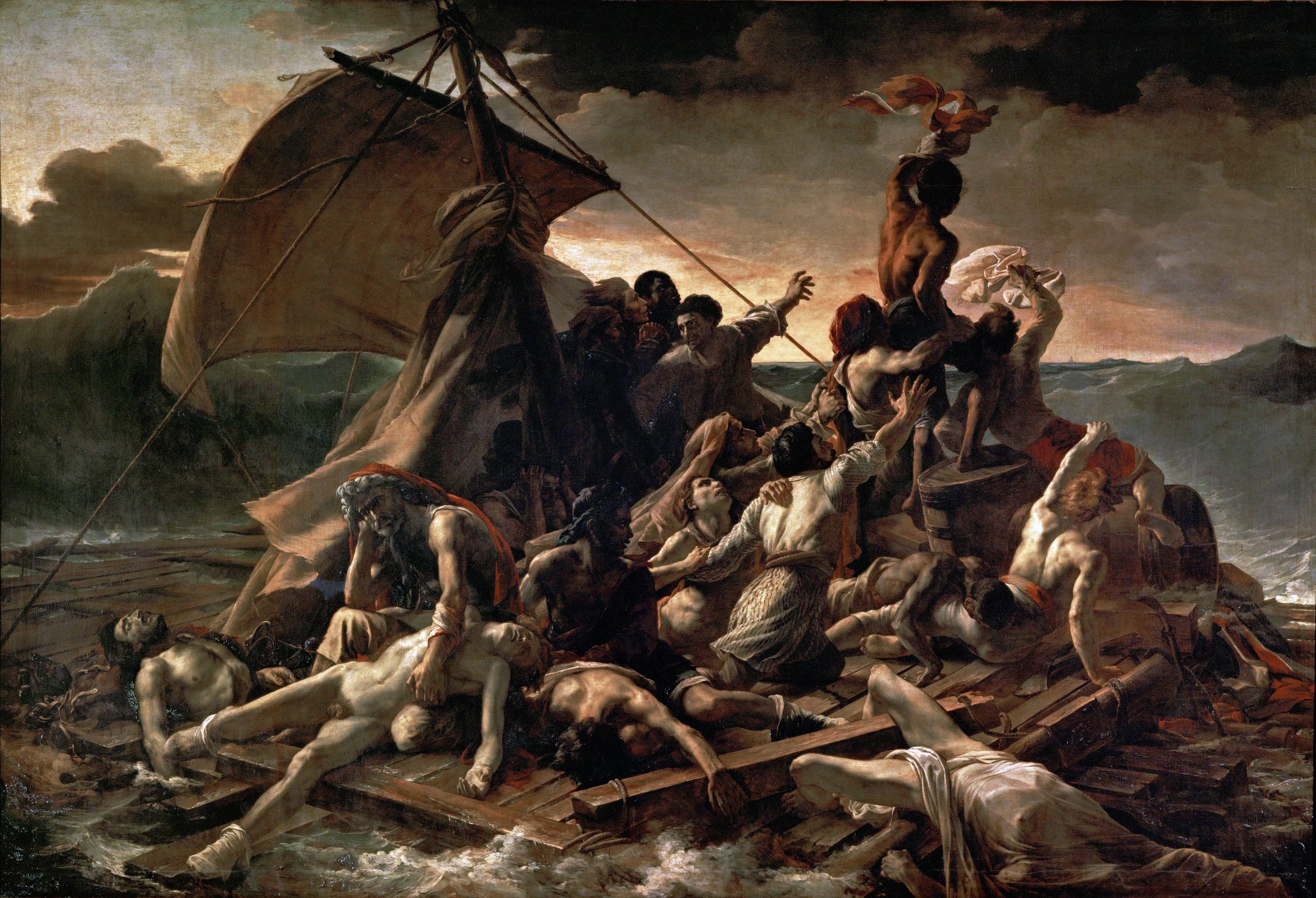
The Raft of the Medusa (1818–1819), Théodore Géricault

There has been debate by scholars over the colors in The Barque of Dante. The art historian Walter Friedländer stated that, while as a whole the painting was reminiscent of Géricault's The Raft of the Medusa, the coloring used by Delacroix was a drastic advancement from the sharp chiaroscuro used in The Raft of the Medusa. Lee Jonson disagreed with this assessment, arguing that the ochre lights and black or brown shadows in The Barque of Dante were "virtually indistinguishable" from those in The Raft of the Medusa.

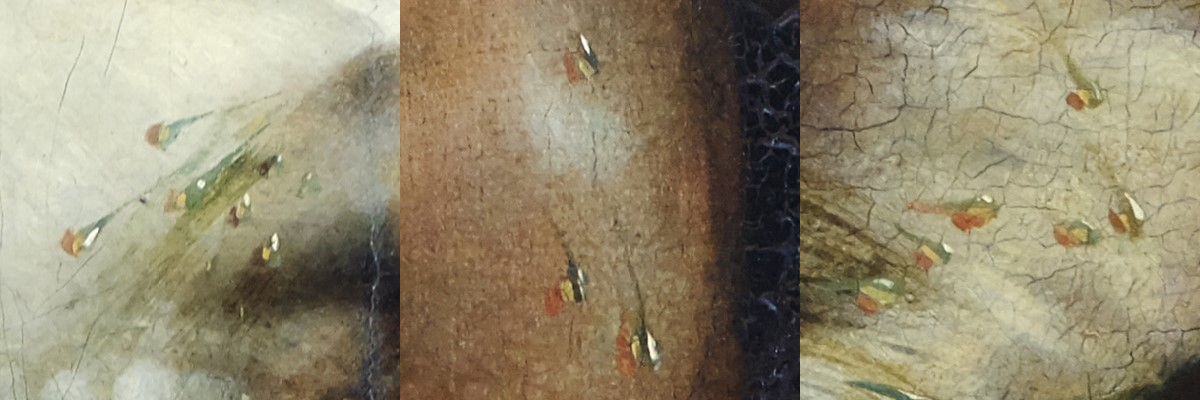
The "rainbow" water droplets on the damned figures in the foreground

The painting's primary color innovation is found in the depiction of water droplets rolling off the damned in the painting's foreground. The drops are created out of vibrant, unmixed colors in a rainbow-like effect: dabs of green and yellow are placed together, with red for shadows and white for highlights. Andrieu claimed that Delacroix struggled with the droplets, but was inspired by Rubens's The Arrival of Marie de Medici at Marseille and his own analysis of the rainbow's gradations. However, the colors used are much more vibrant than those in Rubens's painting, and green is added to the pigments used. This decomposition of the colors is evidence to Delacroix's early interest in a "rational" analysis of color, a theory which he later pursued. The arts professor Frank Trapp believed that these drops may have been added or modified during its restoration from 1860 to 1861, labeling them "at best impure evidence". Johnson disagreed, noting that the technique is much more simplistic than his those he used at the time of the restoration, and he would not have permitted his assistant to make such a drastic alteration to the painting.

== See also ==
- Dante and Virgil – 1850 painting by William-Adolphe Bouguereau, also exhibited at the Paris Salon
- Francesca da Rimini and Paolo Malatesta Appraised by Dante and Virgil – a series of paintings by Ary Scheffer, also exhibited at the Paris Salon
