= Secular Games =

Roman religious celebration

The Secular or Saecular Games (Ludi Saeculares) was an ancient Roman religious celebration involving sacrifices, theatrical performances, and public games (ludi). It was held irregularly in Rome for three days and nights to mark the ends of various eras (saecula) and to celebrate the beginning of the next. In particular, the Romans reckoned a saeculum as the longest possible length of human life, either 100 or 110 years in length; as such, it was used to mark various centennials, particularly anniversaries from the computed founding of Rome.

According to Roman mythology, the Secular Games began as the Tarentine Games (Ludi Tarentini) when a Sabine man called Valesius prayed for a cure for his children's illness and was supernaturally instructed to sacrifice on the Campus Martius to Dis Pater and Proserpina, deities of the underworld. Some ancient authors traced official celebrations of the Games as far back as 509 BC, but the only clearly attested celebrations under the Roman Republic took place in 249 and in the 140s BC. They involved sacrifices to the underworld gods over three consecutive nights. The Games were revived in 17 BC by Rome's first emperor Augustus, with the nocturnal sacrifices on the Campus Martius now transferred to the Moerae (fates), the Ilythiae (goddesses of childbirth), and Terra Mater ("Mother Earth"). The Games of 17 BC also introduced day-time sacrifices to Roman deities on the Capitoline and Palatine hills. Certain sacrifices were unusually specified to be performed by married women. Each sacrifice was followed by theatrical performances. Later emperors held celebrations in AD 88 and 204, after intervals of roughly 110 years. However, they were also held by Claudius in AD 47 to celebrate the 800th anniversary of Rome's foundation, which led to a second cycle of Games in 148 and 248. The Games were abandoned under later Christian emperors.

== Republic ==
According to Roman mythology told by Zosimus, the Secular Games originated with a Sabine man called Valesius, ancestor of the Valerii. When his children became seriously ill, he prayed to his household gods for their cure, offering to give up his own life in exchange. A voice told him to take them to Tarentum and to give them water from the Tiber to drink, heated on an altar of Dis Pater and Proserpina. Assuming that he had to travel to the Greek colony of Tarentum in southern Italy, he set out with his children on the journey. Sailing along the Tiber, he was instructed by the voice to stop on the Campus Martius, at a place which happened also to be called Tarentum. When he warmed water from the river and gave it to the children, they were miraculously cured and fell asleep. When they woke up, they informed Valesius that a figure had appeared to them in a dream and told the family to sacrifice to Dis Pater and Proserpina. Upon digging, Valesius found that an altar to those deities was buried on the site, and performed the ritual as instructed.

Celebrations of the Games under the Roman Republic are poorly documented. Although some Roman antiquarians traced them as far back as 509 BC, some modern scholars consider that the first celebration well attested as having taken place was that of 249 BC, during the First Punic War. But even the historicity of the later republican Secular games of 249 and 146 is disputed. According to Varro, an antiquarian of the 1st century BC, the Games were introduced after a series of portents led to a consultation of the Sibylline Books by the quindecimviri. In accordance with the instructions contained in these books, sacrifices were offered at the Tarentum on the Campus Martius over three nights, to the underworld deities of Dis Pater and Proserpina. Varro also states that a vow was made that the Games would be repeated every hundred years, and another celebration did indeed take place in either 149 or 146 BC, at the time of the Third Punic War. However, Beard, North and Price suggest that the Games of 249 and the 140s BC were both held because of the immediate pressures of war, and that it was only with the revival in the 140s that they came to be considered as a regular centennial celebration. This sequence would have led to a celebration in 49 BC, but the civil wars apparently prevented this.

== Augustus ==
The Games were revived in 17 BC by Rome's first emperor Augustus. The date was justified by a Sibylline oracle that called for the Games to be celebrated every 110 years, and a new reconstruction of the Games' Republican history which placed a first celebration in 456 BC.

Before the Games themselves, heralds went around the city and invited the people to "a spectacle, such as they had never witnessed and never would again". The quindecimviri sat on the Capitol and in the temple of Apollo on the Palatine, and handed out to the free citizens torches, sulphur and asphalt, to be burnt as a means of purification. (This may have been modelled on the purificatory rituals of the Parilia, the anniversary of Rome's foundation.) Offerings of wheat, barley, and beans were also made.

The Senate decreed that an inscribed record of the Games should be set up in the Tarentum, a site in the Campus Martius. This inscription has partially survived, and offers information about the ceremonies. The night-time sacrifices were made not to the underworld deities Dis Pater and Proserpina, but to the Moerae (fates), the Ilythiae (goddesses of childbirth), and Terra Mater (the "Earth mother"). These were "more beneficent honorands, who nonetheless shared with Dis Pater and Proserpina the twin characteristics of being Greek in nomenclature and without cult in the Roman state". The nocturnal sacrifices to Greek deities on the Campus Martius alternated with day-time sacrifices to Roman deities on the Capitoline and Palatine hills.

Date	Time	Location	Deities	Sacrifices
May 31	Night	Campus Martius	Moerae	9 female lambs, 9 she-goats
June 1	Day	Capitoline Hill	Jupiter Optimus Maximus	2 bulls
June 1	Night	Campus Martius	Ilythiae (Εἰλείθυια)	27 sacrificial cakes (9 of each of three types)
June 2	Day	Capitoline Hill	Juno Regina	2 cows
June 2	Night	Campus Martius	Terra Mater	Pregnant sow
June 3	Day	Palatine Hill	Apollo and Diana	27 sacrificial cakes (9 of each of three types)

The key roles were played by Augustus and his son-in-law Marcus Vipsanius Agrippa, in their capacity as members of the quindecimviri; Augustus participated alone in the night-time sacrifices but was joined by Agrippa for those during the day. After the sacrifices of June 3, choirs of boys and girls sang the Carmen Saeculare, composed for the occasion by the poet Horace. This hymn was sung both on the Palatine and then on the Capitoline, but its words focus on the Palatine deities Apollo and Diana, which were more closely associated with Augustus. The hymn adds a further level of complexity to the alternation of sacrifices between Greek and Roman deities by addressing the Greek deities under Latin names.

Each sacrifice was followed by theatrical performances. Once the major sacrifices were over, the days between June 5 and June 11 were devoted to Greek and Latin plays, and June 12 saw chariot racing and displays of hunting.

== Later games ==
The Games continued to be celebrated under later emperors, but two different systems of calculation were used to determine their dates. Claudius held them in AD 47 to celebrate the 800th year from the foundation of Rome. According to Suetonius, a herald's proclamation of a spectacle "which no one had ever seen or would ever see again" amused his listeners, some of whom had attended the Games under Augustus.

Under subsequent emperors, Games were celebrated on both the Augustan and the Claudian systems. Domitian held his in AD 88, possibly 110 years from a planned Augustan celebration in 22 BC, and he was followed by Septimius Severus in AD 204, 220 years from the actual Augustan celebration. On both occasions, the procedure used in 17 BC was followed closely. Antoninus Pius on 21 August 148 and Philip I in 248 followed Claudius in celebrating the 900- and 1000-year anniversaries of Rome's foundation, respectively. These involved rituals at the Temple of Venus and Roma instead of the Tarentum, and the date was probably changed to the Parilia on April 21. In the case of Antoninus Pius, the games aligned with his decennalia, the celebration of the first ten years of his own rule.

By 314, 110 years from the Games of Septimius Severus, the Christian Constantine I was emperor, and no Secular Games were held. The pagan historian Zosimus (fl. c. 498–518), who wrote the most detailed extant account of the Games, blamed this neglect of the traditional ritual for the decline of the Roman Empire.
