= Catacombs of Praetextatus =

Catacombs in Rome

Coordinates: 41°51′32″N 12°30′55″E

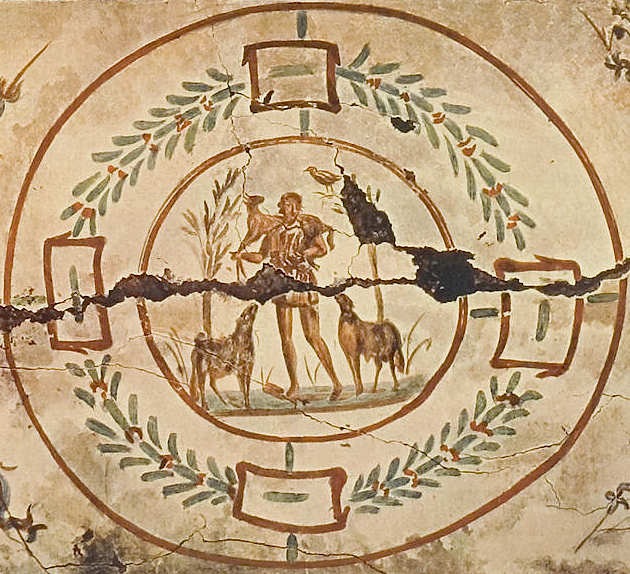
Christ as the Good Shepherd, Catacombs of Praetextatus, second half of third century A.D.

The complex of the Catacombs of Praetextatus is located on the left side of the via Appia in the modern-day Appio-Latino quarter of Rome. Its modern entrance is on the via Appia Pignatelli. It is named after either its founder or the person who donated the land for its construction.

== Bibliography (in Italian) ==
- Lucrezia Spera (2004). Il complesso di Pretestato sulla Via Appia: storia topografica e monumentale di un insediamento funerario paleocristiano nel suburbio di Roma. Città del Vaticano.
- Leonella De Santis, Giuseppe Biamonte (1997). Le catacombe di Roma. Roma: Newton & Compton. p. 52.63.
- Mazzei Barbara, Salvetti Carla (2000). "Il sarcofago attico degli Amorini a Pretestato. Restauro e nuove considerazioni iconografiche". Rivista di Archeologia Cristiana. 76. Città del Vaticano: pontificio istituto di archeologia: 218.
