= Dis (Divine Comedy) =

City in Dante's Inferno

- Divine Comedy location
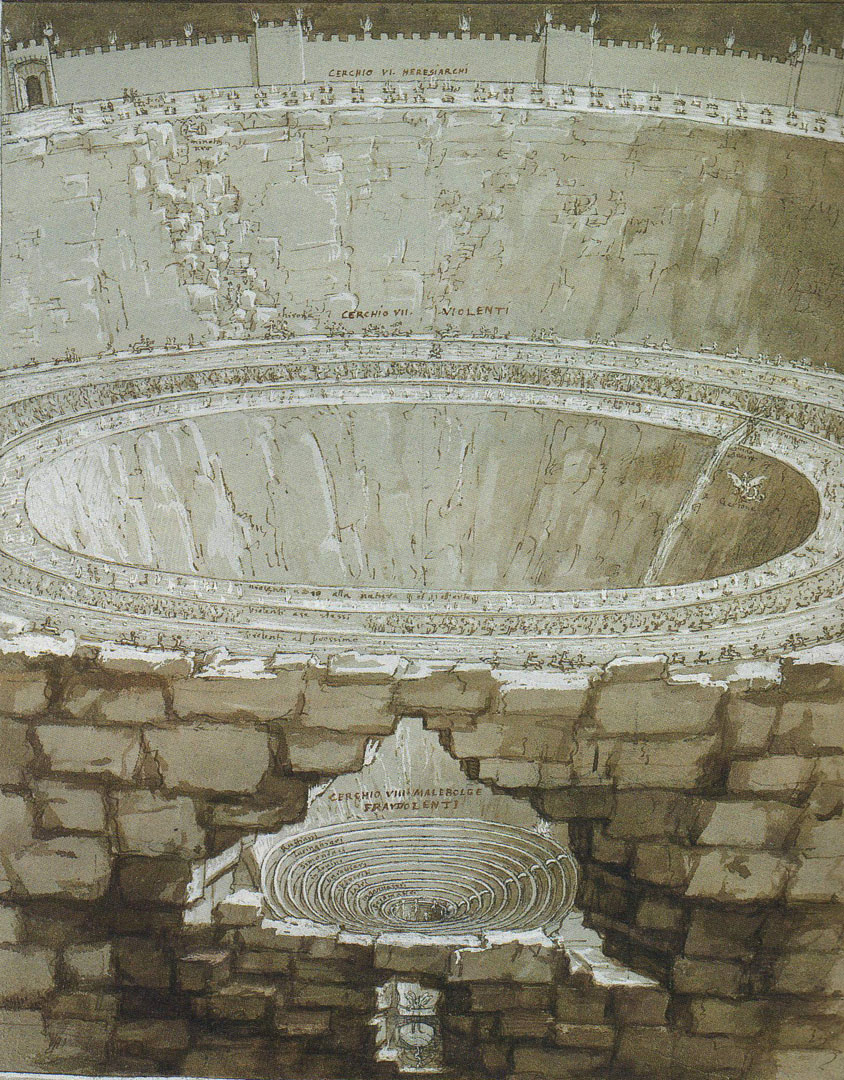
- Lower Hell, inside the walls of Dis, in an illustration by Stradanus. There is a drop from the sixth circle to the three rings of the seventh circle, then again to the ten rings of the eighth circle, and, at the bottom, to the icy ninth circle.
- Created by: Dante Alighieri

In Dante Alighieri's The Divine Comedy, the City of Dis (Italian: Dite Italian pronunciation: [ˈdiːte]) encompasses the sixth through the ninth circles of Hell.

Moated by the river Styx, the fortified city encloses the whole of Lower or Nether Hell.

== Background ==
To ancient Roman mythology, Dis Pater ("Father Dis") is the ruler of the underworld. In the sixth book of Virgil's Aeneid (one of the principal influences on Dante in his depiction of Hell), the hero Aeneas enters the "desolate halls and vacant realm of Dis".

His guide, the Sibyl, corresponds in The Divine Comedy to Virgil, the guide of "Dante" as the speaker of the poem. The descriptions in the Aeneid of "mighty Dis's walls... wide buildings girt by a triple wall", gave Dante the impetus for his later and more formal description of the city of Dis.

== Description ==
The iron walls of Dis are guarded by fallen angels, the Furies, and Medusa. Dante emphasizes the character of the place as a city by describing its architectural features: towers, gates, walls, ramparts, bridges, and moats. It is thus an antithesis to the heavenly city, as for instance described by St. Augustine in his book City of God. Among these structures are mosques, "the worship places of the most dangerous enemies of medieval Christendom." The presence of mosques probably also recalls the reality of Jerusalem in Dante's own time, where gilded domes dominated the skyline.

== Tiers of Hell ==
Before he reaches the City, in the eighth to ninth cantos, Dante encounters the unbaptised and then those who sinned by self-indulgence—the lustful, the gluttons, the misers and spendthrifts—and then at the outskirts of the red-hot walls of the City of Dis are the wrathful and those of ill-will. From this point on we find sinners who acted out of malice and wickedness. Immediately within the walls of the City are heretics like Epicurus, who, having previously disbelieved in immortality, are forever imprisoned in red-hot tombs. Beyond are three rings of those who were violent—to others, to themselves (suicides), or to God (blasphemers). In yet deeper gulfs within the decaying City of Dis are the last two circles, of frauds and corruptors, and finally the traitors.

Punished within Dis are those whose lives were marked by active-willed and obdurate, rather than venial sins: heretics, murderers, suicides, blasphemers, usurers, sodomites, panderers, seducers, flatterers, simoniacs, false prophets, barrators, hypocrites, thieves, fraudulent advisors, sowers of discord, falsifiers, and traitors. Sinners unable to control their passions offend God less than these, whose lives were driven by malizia ("malice, wicked intent"):

Of every malice (malizia) gaining the hatred of Heaven, injustice is the goal; and every such goal injures someone either with force or fraud.

There is perhaps a distinction between malizia as the characteristic of circles seven and eight, and the matta bestialitade, "inhuman wickedness", of circle nine, which punishes those who threaten "the most basic civic, familial, and religious foundations of happiness".

== Later manifestations ==
The City of Dis re-emerges as an image for the post-industrial city of modernity, as in Pasolini's vision of some aspects of modern Rome.

== See also ==
- Pandæmonium
- Pluto
