= List of shipwrecks in December 1835 =

The list of shipwrecks in December 1835 includes ships sunk, foundered, wrecked, grounded or otherwise lost during December 1835.

== 1 December ==
List of shipwrecks: 1 December 1835
Ship	State	Description
Britannia	United Kingdom	The ship was abandoned in the Atlantic Ocean (45°00′N 34°00′W). Her crew were rescued by Rialto (United States). Britannia was on a voyage from Miramichi, New Brunswick, British North America to Cork.
Duckenfield	United Kingdom	The ship was abandoned in the Atlantic Ocean. Her ten surviving crew were rescued by Constitution (United Kingdom).
James Bentley	United Kingdom	The ship was wrecked in Great Egg Harbor Bay. Her crew were rescued. She was on a voyage from Liverpool, Lancashire to Philadelphia, Pennsylvania, United States.
Minx	United Kingdom	The barque was abandoned in the Atlantic Ocean. Her fifteen crew were rescued by Emancipation (United Kingdom). She was on a voyage from "Melis" and Gaspe, Lower Canada, British North America to London.
Munster Lass	United Kingdom	The ship was wrecked in Tramore Bay.
Ottawa	(United Kingdom of Great Britain and Ireland) British North America	The ship was wrecked off Anticosti Island, Lower Canada with the loss of three of her crew. She was on a voyage from Quebec City, Lower Canada to London.
Seraph	United Kingdom	The ship was wrecked at "Montan Point" She was on a voyage from Saint Kitts to Newhaven, Sussex.
Severn	United Kingdom	The ship was driven ashore at Arthurstown, County Wexford.
Victoria	United Kingdom	The ship was driven ashore at Tramore, County Waterford.
Violet	United Kingdom	The brig was lost in the Baie des Trépassés. Loss of crew ariously reported as one, five and all but one of her crew. She was on a voyage from Cádiz, Spain to Leith, Lothian.
Zephyr	United Kingdom	The ship was wrecked off Anticosti Island. She was on a voyage from Quebec City to Hull, Yorkshire.

== 2 December ==
List of shipwrecks: 2 December 1835
Ship	State	Description
Endeavour	United Kingdom	The ship was abandoned off Cacona, Lower Canada, British North America. Her crew were rescued. She was on a voyage from Quebec City, Lower Canada to Liverpool, Lancashire. Endeavour subsequently came ashore in the Barnaby Islands, where she was wrecked.

== 3 December ==
List of shipwrecks: 3 December 1835
Ship	State	Description
Bearnaise	France	The ship was wrecked at Port-la-Nouvelle, Aude with the loss of five of her crew. She was on a voyage from Rio de Janeiro, Brazil to Marseille, Bouches-du-Rhône.
Francis Spaight	United Kingdom	The barque broached and the surviving crew resorted to cannibalism at sea before being rescued and abandoning the ship in the Atlantic Ocean. She was on a voyage from Saint John, New Brunswick, British North America to Limerick. She was towed in to Fuerteventura, Canary Islands in June 1836.
Frederick Wilhelm III	Danzig	The ship ran aground and was wrecked at Kronstadt, Russia. Her crew were rescued.
Norman	United Kingdom	The ship was wrecked on Newfoundland, British North America.
Sarah Ann	United Kingdom	The ship was lost near Digby, Nova Scotia, British North America. Her crew were rescued. She was on a voyage from Jamaica to Saint John, New Brunswick.

== 4 December ==
List of shipwrecks: 4 December 1835
Ship	State	Description
Mochino de Albuquerque	United States	The ship was wrecked on the English Bank with the loss of five of her crew. She was on a voyage from Rio de Janeiro to the River Plate.
Sisters	United Kingdom	The ship was wrecked in the Magdalen Islands, Lower Canada, British North America with the loss of three of her crew.
William and Mary	United Kingdom	The brig was driven ashore and damaged at Musclewick, Pembrokeshire. She was on a voyage from Newport, Monmouthshire to Cork. William and Mary was refloated on 14 December and taken in to Milford Haven, Pembrokeshire for repairs.

== 5 December ==
List of shipwrecks: 5 December 1835
Ship	State	Description
Alcæus	United Kingdom	The ship was driven ashore and wrecked at Rivière-du-Loup, Lower Canada, British North America.
Blackwater	United Kingdom	The ship was driven ashore and wrecked on the Wrangles.
Lady Franklin	United States	The steamship collided with Portsmouth (United States) and sank in the Ohio River with the loss of between 15 and 18 lives.
Reward	United Kingdom	The ship was driven ashore at Newquay, Cornwall.
William and Jane	United Kingdom	The ship sank off Penarth, Glamorgan. She was refloated on 7 December and taken in to Newquay.

== 6 December ==
List of shipwrecks: 6 December 1835
Ship	State	Description
Active	United Kingdom	The schooner sprang a leak and foundered in the English Channel off Penzance, Cornwall. Her crew survived. She was on a voyage from Havre de Grâce, Seine-Inférieure, France to Liverpool, Lancashire
Catharine and Margaret	Russia	The ship was wrecked near Hogland.
Jeune Cæsar	Bremen	The ship was wrecked on the Langlutjen Sand, off Bremerhaven. She was on a voyage from Smyrna, Ottoman Empire to Bremen.
Queen Adelaide	United Kingdom	The ship was abandoned in the Atlantic Ocean. Her nine crew were rescued by Helen (United Kingdom). Queen Adelaide was on a voyage from Quebec City, Lower Canada, British North America to Sunderland, County Durham.

== 7 December ==
List of shipwrecks: 7 December 1835
Ship	State	Description
Harriet	United States	The ship was driven ashore at the Herring Gut, St. George's. She was on a voyage from Nova Scotia, British North America to Boston, Massachusetts.
Marshall	United Kingdom	The ship was driven ashore and wrecked at St. Shott's, Newfoundland, British North America with the loss of three of her crew. She was on a voyage from Quebec City, Lower Canada, British North America to London.
Zenaide	United Kingdom	The ship was sunk by ice of Kronstadt, Russia.

== 8 December ==
List of shipwrecks: 8 December 1835
Ship	State	Description
Hearts of Oak	United Kingdom	The ship departed from Newfoundland for Poole, Dorset. Presumed foundered with the loss of all hands. A box from the ship was discovered on the north coast of Scotland in April 1836.
Juno	United Kingdom	The ship was lost on the Sunken Sand.
Nehosia	Russia	The ship foundered off Saaremaa. She was on a voyage from Saint Petersburg to Pärnu.
Susan Crane	United Kingdom	The ship was wrecked on Cape Sable Island, Nova Scotia, British North America. Her crew were rescued. She was on a voyage from Glasgow, Renfrewshire to Saint John, New Brunswick, British North America or vice versa.

== 9 December ==
List of shipwrecks: 9 December 1835
Ship	State	Description
Helen	United Kingdom	The ship was wrecked in Strangford Lough. She was on a voyage from Riga, Russia to Newry, County Antrim.
Heuruex	France	The ship was wrecked near St. Ive's Head, Cornwall, United Kingdom. Her crew were rescued. She was on a voyage from Barnstaple, Devon, United Kingdom to Portreath, Cornwall.
Marie Thérese	France	The ship was driven ashore and wrecked east of Calais, She was on a voyage from Sunderland, County Durham, United Kingdom to Marans, Charente-Maritime.

== 10 December ==
List of shipwrecks: 10 December 1835
Ship	State	Description
Alexander	United Kingdom	The ship was driven ashore at Travemünde, Prussia.
Hive	United Kingdom	The ship ran aground in Jervis Bay and was wrecked; one crew member lost their life in the mishap. The steamship Tamar ( (United Kingdom of Great Britain and Ireland) New South Wales), HMS Zebra (Royal Navy), and a revenue cutter rescued the survivors.
Benjamin	United Kingdom	The brig was wrecked at Ballyshannon, County Donegal.

== 11 December ==
List of shipwrecks: 11 December 1835
Ship	State	Description
Arethusa	United Kingdom	The brig capsized in the Irish Sea 5 nautical miles (9.3 km) west of the Copeland Lighthouse, Cumberland. Her crew survived. She was on a voyage from Belfast, County Antrim to Whitehaven, Cumberland.
Elizabeth	United Kingdom	The brig foundered in the Irish Sea 4 nautical miles (7.4 km) off Milford Haven, Pembrokeshire. Her six crew survived. She was on a voyage from Cork to Milford Haven.
Isabella	United Kingdom	The ship sprang a leak and was abandoned in the Atlantic Ocean 30 nautical miles (56 km) north west of Inishtrahull Island. County Donegal.
Jemima	United Kingdom	The ship was driven ashore on Lindisfarne, Northumberland. She was on a voyage from Burntisland, Fife to South Shields, County Durham. Jemima was later refloated and taken in to Berwick upon Tweed, Northumberland.

== 12 December ==
List of shipwrecks: 12 December 1835
Ship	State	Description
Adonis	United Kingdom	The ship was driven ashore near Sainte-Marie-du-Mont, Manche, France. She was on a voyage from London to Guernsey, Channel Islands.
Caroline	(United Kingdom of Great Britain and Ireland) Tobago	The drogher foundered off Tobago.
Easthorpe	United Kingdom	The ship was driven ashore at Campbeltown, Argyllshire.
Experiment	United Kingdom	The ship sank in the Irish Sea off Egremont, Cumberland. Her crew were rescued by a lifeboat. Experiment was on a voyage from Liverpool, Lancashire to Jersey, Channel Islands. She was refloated on 17 December and beached.
Frau Anna	Flag unknown	The ship was driven ashore and wrecked at Ringköping, Denmark.
Solerto or Sollicito	Greece	The brig was abandoned in the Atlantic Ocean. Her crew were rescued by Rapid (United Kingdom). She was on a voyage from Smyrna, Ottoman Empire to Boston, Massachusetts, United States.

== 13 December ==
List of shipwrecks: 13 December 1835
Ship	State	Description
Arethusa	United Kingdom	The ship capsized in the Irish Sea and was abandoned by her crew. She was on a voyage from Belfast, County Antrim to Workington, Cumberland.
Experiment	United Kingdom	The ship sank at Liverpool, Lancashire. Her crew were rescued.

== 14 December ==
List of shipwrecks: 14 December 1835
Ship	State	Description
Independence	United States	The whaler was wrecked on Starbuck Island. Her crew survived.
Margaret	(United Kingdom of Great Britain and Ireland) Jersey	The ctter struck a rock and foundered in St Clements Bay, Jersey with the loss of ten of the fifteen people on board. She was on a voyage from Granville, Manche, France to Jersey.
Nautilus	Hamburg	The ship was driven ashore near "Sloer". She was on a voyage from Hamburg to Valparaíso, Chile. Nautilus was later refloated and taken in to Glückstadt, Duchy of Holstein.
Snowden	United Kingdom	The ship ran aground off Demerara. She was on a voyage from Liverpool, Lancashire to Demerara. Snowden was refloated on 22 December.

== 15 December ==
List of shipwrecks: 15 December 1835
Ship	State	Description
Bonne Esperance	France	The ship was driven ashore near Havre de Grâce, Seine-Inférieure. She was on a voyage from Riga, Russia to Havre de Grâce.
Diana	United Kingdom	The ship was wrecked near Cape Bon, Tunisia with the loss of four of her crew. She was on a voyage from Smyrna, Ottoman Empire to Liverpool, Lancashire.
Flora	United Kingdom	The ship was driven ashore near Hamburg. Her crew were rescued. She was on a voyage from Newcastle upon Tyne, Northumberland to Hamburg.

== 16 December ==
List of shipwrecks: 16 December 1835
Ship	State	Description
Little Mary	United States	The ship was wrecked on Partridge Island, Nova Scotia, British North America. She was on a voyage from New York to Saint John, New Brunswick, British North America.

== 17 December ==
List of shipwrecks: 17 December 1835
Ship	State	Description
Aisthorp	United Kingdom	The ship was driven ashore and wrecked at Campbeltown, Argyllshire. She was on a voyage from Belfast, County Antrim to Campbeltown.
Philippine	Danzig	The ship was driven ashore at "Gretlingboholm". Her crew were rescued. She was on a voyage from Danzig to Saint Petersburg, Russia.
Saratoga	United States	The ship was struck by lightning and consequently destroyed by fire at Gibraltar. Her crew were rescued. She was on a voyage from Palermo, Sicily to New York.

== 18 December ==
List of shipwrecks: 18 December 1835
Ship	State	Description
Colbert	France	The ship was wrecked at Cherbourg, Seine-Inférieure with the loss of all but one of her crew.
Hirondelle	Belgium	The ship was destroyed by fire at Guayaquil, Ecuador.

== 19 December ==
List of shipwrecks: 19 December 1835
Ship	State	Description
Ann and Mary	United Kingdom	The ship was driven ashore at Winterton-on-Sea, Norfolk. She was on a voyage from Selby, Yorkshire to London. Her crew were rescued. Ann and Mary was refloated on 27 December and taken in to Great Yarmouth, Norfolk.
Athenæum	United Kingdom	The ship was driven ashore. She was later refloated and put into Huntingdon.
Caroline	Sweden	The ship was driven ashore at Seaton, Devon. She was on a voyage from Cádiz, Spain to Stockholm.
Diana	United Kingdom	The ship was driven ashore and damaged at Lowestoft, Suffolk. Her crew were rescued. She was refloated on 29 December.
Dufflin	United Kingdom	The ship was driven ashore at Lowestoft. Her crew were rescued.
Elizabeth	United Kingdom	The ship was wrecked on the Herd Sand, in the North Sea off the coast of County Durham. Her crew were rescued. She was on a voyage from Liverpool, Lancashire to South Shields, County Durham.
Elizabeth and Mary	United Kingdom	The ship was driven ashore at Lowestoft. Her crew were rescued. She was refloated on 29 December.
Fanny	United Kingdom	The ship was driven ashore and sank at Pakefield, Suffolk. Her crew were rescued.
Friends' Adventure	United Kingdom	The ship was driven ashore and wrecked at Lowestoft. Her crew were rescued.
Fortitude	United Kingdom	The ship was driven ashore at Lowestoft. Her crew were rescued.
Fortune	United Kingdom	The ship was driven ashore in Sandwich Bay, Kent. She was on a voyage from Newcastle upon Tyne, Northumberland to Sandwich, Kent.
Hansfield	United Kingdom	The ship was driven ashore at Lowestoft. Her crew were rescued. She was refloated on 16 January 1836 and taken in to Lowestoft.
Jason	United Kingdom	The ship was abandoned in the Atlantic Ocean.
John and Joseph	United Kingdom	The ship was driven ashore and wrecked at Caister-on-Sea, Norfolk. She was on a voyage from Selby to Beccles, Suffolk.
Lark	United Kingdom	The ship was driven ashore at Lowestoft.
Lord Brougham	United Kingdom	The ship was driven ashore and sank at Lowestoft. Her crew were rescued.
Petrel	United Kingdom	The ship was driven ashore and wrecked at Pakefield. Her crew were rescued.
Royalist	United Kingdom	The ship was driven ashore at Lowestoft. Her crew were rescued. She was refloated in January 1836 and taken in to Lowestoft.
Trio	United Kingdom	The ship was driven ashore at Lowestoft. Her crew were rescued.
Tribune	United Kingdom	The ship was driven ashore and wrecked at Pakefield. Her crew were rescued. She was on a voyage from Selby to London.
Two Brothers	United Kingdom	The ship foundered in the North Sea off Lowestoft. She was on a voyage from Sunderland, County Durham to London.
Vrow Petronella	Netherlands	The ship was wrecked near "Bombalin". She was on a voyage from Memel, Prussia to Amsterdam, North Holland.

== 20 December ==
List of shipwrecks: 20 December 1835
Ship	State	Description
Albion	United Kingdom	The ship was driven ashore at Herne Bay, Kent. She was refloated on 12 January 1836.
Bristol	United Kingdom	The ship departed from Plymouth, Devon for Glasgow, Renfrewshire. No further trace, presumed foundered with the loss of all hands.
Bussick	United Kingdom	The ship was driven ashore at Filey, Yorkshire. She was refloated in January 1836 and put into Sunderland, County Durham.
Celine	France	The ship collided with another vessel and foundered off the Cordouan Lighthouse, Gironde. Her crew were rescued. She was on a voyage from San Sebastián, Spain to Bordeaux, Gironde.
Economy	United Kingdom	The ship was driven ashore at Bridlington, Yorkshire. She was on a voyage from London to South Shields, County Durham.
Hercules	United Kingdom	The ship was wrecked on Bornholm, Denmark. She was on a voyage from Riga, Russia to Hull, Yorkshire.
Laurel	United Kingdom	The ship was wrecked on Lindisfarne, Northumberland. Her crew were rescued. She was on a voyage from Caernarvon to Newcastle upon Tyne, Northumberland.
London	United Kingdom	The steamship caught fire and was beached at Grimsby, Lincolnshire. All 73 people on board survived. She was on a voyage from Hull, Yorkshire to London. London was refloated on 5 January 1836 and taken in to Hull.
Neptune	France	The ship was wrecked on Bornholm. She was on a voyage from Pillau, Prussia to Dunkirk, Nord.
Scandinavian	Denmark	The ship was wrecked on Bornholm. She was on a voyage from Riga to Copenhagen.
Triune	United Kingdom	The ship sank near Pakefield. She was on a voyage from London to Selby, Yorkshire. Triune was refloated in April 1836 and taken in to Lowestoft.

== 21 December ==
List of shipwrecks: 21 December 1835
Ship	State	Description
Commerce	United Kingdom	The ship was driven ashore and wrecked at Orford Haven, Suffolk. She was on a voyage from Newcastle upon Tyne, Northumberland to Great Yarmouth, Norfolk.
Diana	United Kingdom	The ship was driven ashore at Lowestoft, Suffolk. She was refloated on 29 December.
Eliza and Mary	United Kingdom	The ship was driven ashore at Lowestoft. She was refloated on 29 December.
Flower	United Kingdom	The ship was abandoned in the Atlantic Ocean. Her crew were rescued. She was on a voyage from Vigo, Spain to London.
Jean	United States	The ship foundered off the "Starreis". Her crew were rescued.
Laura	United Kingdom	The ship was driven ashore and severely damaged at Demerara. She was later refloated.
Seneca	(United Kingdom of Great Britain and Ireland) Jersey	The ship was driven ashore and damaged at Lowestoft. She was refloated on 29 December and taken in to Great Yarmouth.
Superior	United Kingdom	The ship was driven ashore and wrecked at Bawdsey, Suffolk. She was on a voyage from Boston, Lincolnshire to Norwich, Norfolk.
Veloce	France	The ship was lost in the River Plate.

== 22 December ==
List of shipwrecks: 22 December 1835
Ship	State	Description
Clara	United Kingdom	The ship was abandoned in the Atlantic Ocean. Her crew were rescued by John Taylor (United Kingdom). Clara was on a voyage from Quebec City, Lower Canada, British North America to Bristol, Gloucestershire.
Loch Ech	United Kingdom	The ship collided with Ranger in the River Mersey and was beached at Seacombe, Cheshire. She was on a voyage from Liverpool, Lancashire to Newry, County Antrim.
St. David	United Kingdom	The steamship was driven ashore at Egremont, Cumberland. She was on a voyage from Liverpool to Newry.

== 23 December ==
List of shipwrecks: 23 December 1835
Ship	State	Description
Watchman	United Kingdom	The ship was destroyed by fire in Mobile Bay.

== 24 December ==
List of shipwrecks: 25 December 1835
Ship	State	Description
Malta	United Kingdom	The ship struck the Black Rock, in the Isles of Scilly, and sank. Her crew were rescued. She was on a voyage from Cardiff, Glamorgan to Plymouth, Devon.
Spectre	United Kingdom	The ship struck a rock off Lindisfarne, Northumberland and was severely damaged. She put into Berwick upon Tweed, Northumberland.

== 25 December ==
List of shipwrecks: 25 December 1835
Ship	State	Description
Plover	United Kingdom	The crew abandoned their ship in the North Sea 12 nautical miles (22 km) west north west of Inverness. Earl Grey (United Kingdom) rescued the crew.
Unity	United Kingdom	The ship was wrecked at Blyth, Northumberland. She was on a voyage from Montrose, Forfarshire to Newcastle upon Tyne, Northumberland.

== 26 December ==
List of shipwrecks: 26 December 1835
Ship	State	Description
Auguste	Prussia	The ship ran aground of Læsø, Denmark, where she was wrecked on 30 December. Her crew were rescued. She was on a voyage from Kiel to Emden, Kingdom of Hanover.
Blackwell	United Kingdom	The ship departed from Mauritius for Calcutta, India. Presumed subsequently foundered as one of her boats was discovered on 30 January 1836.
Bristol	United Kingdom	The ship departed from Plymouth, Devon for Glasgow, Renfrewshire. No further trace, presumed foundered with the loss of all hands.
Montaniessa	Spain	The ship was driven ashore near Calais, France. Her crew were rescued. She was on a voyage from Amsterdam, North Holland, Netherlands to Bilbao. Montaniessa was later refloated and taken in to Calais.
Salamandre	French Navy	The Sphinx-class aviso was wrecked near Monastagem, Algeria.

== 27 December ==
List of shipwrecks: 27 December 1836
Ship	State	Description
Grace	United Kingdom	The ship was driven ashore at Alexandria, Egypt. She was later refloated.
Happy Jack	United Kingdom	The ship was wrecked at São Miguel Island, Azores with the loss of all but one of her crew.
Kent	United Kingdom	The ship was driven ashore near Yarmouth, Nova Scotia, British North America and abandoned by her crew.

== 28 December ==
List of shipwrecks: 28 December 1836
Ship	State	Description
Fifeshire	United Kingdom	The ship was driven ashore and wrecked at Alexandria, Egypt. Her crew were rescued. She was on a voyage from Swansea, Glamorgan to Alexandria.
Wilhelmine Sophie	Hamburg	The ship was wrecked at Domesnes, Norway. Her crew were rescued. She was on a voyage from Riga, Russia to Hamburg.

== 29 December ==
List of shipwrecks: 29 December 1835
Ship	State	Description
Elvina	France	The ship was driven ashore near Toulon, Var. She was on a voyage from Cayenne to Marseille, Bouches-du-Rhône.
Jong Jacobus	Netherlands	The barque was lost on the Ooster Bank, in the North Sea. She was on a voyage from Batavia, Netherlands East Indies to Rotterdam, South Holland.
Vrow Hillegine	Prussia	The ship was wrecked near the Dutch Cape.

== 30 December ==
List of shipwrecks: 30 December 1835
Ship	State	Description
Maria Margaretha	Prussia	The ship was lost at the entrance to the "Campo Sea". Her crew were rescued. She was on a voyage from Memel to Amsterdam, North Holland, Netherlands.
St. James	United Kingdom	The ship was driven ashore and damageded near Cape Baba, Ottoman Empire. She was on a voyage from Cardiff, Glamorgan to Constantinople, Ottoman Empire. St. James was refloated on 10 January 1836 and taken in to Constantinople.

== 31 December ==
List of shipwrecks: 31 December 1835
Ship	State	Description
Bourbonnais	France	The ship was wrecked at Île Bourbon.
Christiana	United Kingdom	The ship ran aground on the Middle Ground, off Copenhagen, Denmark. She was on a voyage from Riga, Russia to Plymouth, Devon. Christiana was refloated on 1 January 1836.
Laurentio	France	The ship was wrecked at Île Bourbon.
Nautilus	United Kingdom	The ship ran aground on the Middle Ground. She was on a voyage from Riga to London. Nautilus was refloated on 1 January 1836. She was taken in to Copenhagen, where she was condemned.

== Unknown date ==
List of shipwrecks: Unknown date 1835
Ship	State	Description
Agenoria	United Kingdom	The ship was driven ashore at Sandy Cove, Nova Scotia, British North America. She was on a voyage from St. Andrews, New Brunswick, British North America to Newcastle upon Tyne, Northumberland.
Andreas	United Kingdom	The ship was wrecked near Rügen before 5 December. She was on a voyage from Portsoy, Banffshire to Swinemünde, Prussia.
Caroline	United Kingdom	The schooner was lost in the McLay River, New South Wales.
Cavalier	United Kingdom	The ship was abandoned in the Atlantic Ocean before 26 December.
Columbia	United Kingdom	The ship was wrecked in St John's Bay, Newfoundland, British North America.
Constancia	Hamburg	The ship was destroyed by fire in the Atlantic Ocean. Her crew were rescued by Eliza (United Kingdom). Constancia was on a voyage from Hamburg to Rio de Janeiro, Brazil.
Cordelia	United Kingdom	The ship was driven ashore at Altona, Hamburg. She was on a voyage from Hamburg to Newcastle upon Tyne, Northumberland.
Cordillo	United Kingdom	The ship was driven ashore at Hamburg. She was on a voyage from Hamburg to Newcastle upon Tyne, Northumberland. Cordillo was refloated on 17 December.
Coromandel	France	The ship was driven ashore and severely damaged at Cannonier Point, Mauritius. She was refloated on 4 December with assistance from a Royal Navy warship.
Eleanor	United Kingdom	The barque was wrecked on the Dry Tortugas. She was on a voyage from New Orleans, Louisiana, United States to Liverpool, Lancashire.
Fawcett	United Kingdom	The ship was driven ashore at Workington, Cumberland. She was on a voyage from Bathurst, Gambia Colony and Protectorate to the Water of Urr.
Ganges	United Kingdom	The ship was driven ashore at Demerara. She was on a voyage from Gloucester, Nova Scotia, British North America to Surinam.
Henriette	United Kingdom	The ship was lost at Sainte-Marie, Île Bourbon between 1 and 12 December.
Home	United Kingdom	The ship capsized in the Grand Banks of Newfoundland before 24 December. Eleven of the sixteen people on board died by the time rescue came.
Il Genieo Navigatore	Austrian Empire	The brig foundered in the Ionian Sea 40 nautical miles (74 km) off Cephalonia, United States of the Ionian Islands. Her crew survived.
Janson	United Kingdom	The ship was abandoned in the Atlantic Ocean on or before 19 December.
Jolly Rambler	(United Kingdom of Great Britain and Ireland) New South Wales	The ship was wrecked in Poverty Bay, New Zealand.
Kurneback	United States	The ship was wrecked at Guadeloupe.
Laurel	United Kingdom	The ship was wrecked on Lindisfarne, Northumberland before 21 December. She was on a voyage from Caernarfon to Newcastle upon Tyne.
Mentor	United Kingdom	The ship was driven ashore at Seaton, Devon before 22 December.
Merit	United Kingdom	The barque was abandoned in the Atlantic Ocean on or before 5 December.
Merlin	United Kingdom	The ship was driven ashore at Hamburg. She was on a voyage from Hamburg to Leith, Lothian. Merlin was refloated on 17 December.
Milo	United Kingdom	The ship was wrecked on the coast of Newfoundland before 25 December. Her crew were rescued.
New Union	United Kingdom	The ship was wrecked at Burn's Point, Cumberland before 7 December with the loss of all hands. She was on a voyage from Harrington, Cumberland to Dumfries.
Nordstjernen	(Russian Empire)	The ship was driven ashore and wrecked at "Waddareen". She was on a voyage from Liverpool to Gamla Carleby.
Packet	United States	The ship was abandoned in the Atlantic Ocean before 19 December. She was on a voyage from New York to Madeira
Persian	United Kingdom	The ship was wrecked in Chaleur Bay.
Phœnix	Hamburg	The ship struck a rock in the Nordfjord. She was taken in to "Soggindal", Norway where she sank.
Princess Victoria	United Kingdom	The ship was driven ashore at Southport Lancashire before 10 December.
Proctor	United Kingdom	The ship was wrecked in the Magdalen Islands, Lower Canada, British North America.
Rhône	France	The whaler was lost in the Los Chinos Archipelago, in the Pacific Ocean off the coast of Chile. Her crew were rescued.
Robert	United Kingdom	The ship was wrecked in St. John's Bay.
Sarah	United Kingdom	The ship was lost off the Water of Urr before 7 December. Her crew were rescued. She was on a voyage from Maryport, Cumberland to the Water of Urr.
St. Patrick	United Kingdom	The ship sank at Crosshaven, County Cork.
Three Sisters	United Kingdom	The ship was wrecked in the Magdalen Islands.
Tim	United States	The brig was wrecked on Garden Island, Colony of Western Australia.
Videt	United Kingdom	The ship was wrecked on the French coast before 19 December with the loss of six of her crew. She was on a voyage from Cádiz, Spain to Leith, Lothian.
Woodman	United Kingdom	The ship was wrecked in St. John's Bay. She was on a voyage from Quebec City, Lower Canada to Hull, Yorkshire.
