= List of shipwrecks in July 1845 =

The list of shipwrecks in July 1845 includes ships sunk, foundered, wrecked, grounded, or otherwise lost during July 1845.

== 1 July ==
List of shipwrecks: 1 July 1845
Ship	State	Description
Dove	United Kingdom	The ship ran aground at Maryport, Cumberland and was damaged. She was on a voyage from Cardiff, Glamorgan to Maryport. She was refloated and taken in to Maryport in a leaky condition.
Glendower	United States	The full-rigged ship was driven ashore at Portmadoc, Caernarfonshire, United Kingdom. Her crew were rescued by the Portmadoc Lifeboat.
Harriet	United Kingdom	The ship was driven ashore and wrecked at Bognor, Sussex. Her crew were rescued. She was on a voyage from Berwick upon Tweed, Northumberland to Plymouth, Devon.
Marquette	United States	The steamboat was destroyed by a boiler explosion at New Orleans, Louisiana with the loss of about 30 lives.
Tritonia	United Kingdom	The ship was driven ashore and wrecked at Wembury, Devon.

== 2 July ==
List of shipwrecks: 2 July 1845
Ship	State	Description
Clara	United Kingdom	The ship ran aground in Liverpool Bay. She was refloated and put back to Liverpool, Lancashire.
Panther	United Kingdom	The ship ran aground in the Hooghly River.

== 3 July ==
List of shipwrecks: 3 July 1845
Ship	State	Description
Ann	United Kingdom	The sloop sank in Abergele Bay.
Deborah	United Kingdom	The sloop sank in Abergele Bay.
Lady Smith	United Kingdom	The ship was wrecked off the Sambro Island Lighthouse, Nova Scotia, British North America. She was on a voyage from Boston, Massachusetts to Halifax, Nova Scotia.
Romulus	United Kingdom	The ship ran aground at Kronstadt, Russia. She was later refloated.
Sovereign	United Kingdom	The ship struck rocks at Saint Roch Point, Province of Canada, British North America. She consequently put back to Quebec City.
Temperance	United Kingdom	The ship ran aground on the Doom Bar. She was later refloated and taken in to Padstow, Cornwall.

== 4 July ==
List of shipwrecks: 4 July 1845
Ship	State	Description
Border Chieftain	United Kingdom	The ship was wrecked 3 nautical miles (5.6 km) south west of Wick, Caithness. Her crew were rescued. She was on a voyage from Newcastle upon Tyne, Northumberland to Dublin.
Eliza	(United Kingdom of Great Britain and Ireland) New Zealand	The schooner was wrecked on rocks at Palliser Bay, en route from Wellington to the Chatham Islands, during the same gale that sank the Tyne (qv).
Helicon	United Kingdom	The ship sank at the Mumbles, Glamorgan. She was refloated on 20 July and beached.
Patriot	(United Kingdom of Great Britain and Ireland) Jersey	The ship sprang a leak and foundered off Cabo de Peñas, Spain. Her crew were rescued. She was on a voyage from Newcastle upon Tyne to Gijón, Spain.
Tyne	United Kingdom	The barque was wrecked on the Rima Ripa Rocks, off Sinclair Head, New Zealand, during the same gale that sank the Eliza (qv). She was en route from Gravesend to Wellington. Her crew were rescued. She was on a voyage from London to New Zealand.

== 5 July ==
List of shipwrecks: 5 July 1845
Ship	State	Description
Dalkeith	United Kingdom	The ship was wrecked on the Mull of Kintyre, Argyllshire, She was on a voyage from Glasgow, Renfrewshire to Fort William Inverness-shire.

== 6 July ==
List of shipwrecks: 6 July 1845
Ship	State	Description
Dunmore	United Kingdom	The ship caught fire and was abandoned off the coast of Africa. Her crew were rescued by Christina (United Kingdom). Dunmore was on a voyage from Leith, Lothian to Aden.
Mermaid	(United Kingdom of Great Britain and Ireland) British North America	The ship was wrecked at "Mignolan".
Sphinx	French Navy	The Sphinx-class aviso ran aground near Cape Matifu, Algeria and was wrecked. Her crew were rescued by Caméléon, Chimère and Tartare (all French Navy).

== 7 July ==
List of shipwrecks: 7 July 1845
Ship	State	Description
Abcona	United Kingdom	The ship ran aground off Saaremaa, Russia. She was later refloated and taken in to Kronstadt, Russia, where she arrived on 23 July.
Fairy	United Kingdom	The ship was driven ashore at Wick, Caithness.
Jacqurea	Hamburg	The ship ran aground and sank at Wells-next-the-Sea, Norfolk, United Kingdom. She was on a voyage from Hamburg to Wells-next-the-Sea.
Jessie	United Kingdom	The ship was driven ashore at Wick.

== 8 July ==
List of shipwrecks: 8 July 1845
Ship	State	Description
Clara	United Kingdom	The ship was wrecked at the Mumbles, Glamorgan.
Mary	(United Kingdom of Great Britain and Ireland) British North America	The ship was abandoned in the Atlantic Ocean. She was on a voyage from Bedeque, Prince Edward Island to Dublin. She was subsequently towed in to Saint John's, Newfoundland by Albion (United Kingdom).
Sherry	United Kingdom	The ship ran aground and was severely damaged at Hull, Yorkshire.

== 9 July ==
List of shipwrecks: 9 July 1845
Ship	State	Description
Ceres	Hamburg	The ship ran aground in the Elbe at Blankenese.
Helena	United Kingdom	The ship was in collision with another vessel and sank in the English Channel. Her crew survived. She was on a voyage from Rouen, Seine-Inférieure, France to Newcastle upon Tyne, Northumberland.
Industry	United Kingdom	The ship ran aground at Cromarty. She was consequently condemned.
Industry	(United Kingdom of Great Britain and Ireland) British North America	The ship was wrecked at Country Harbour, Nova Scotia.
True Blue	(United Kingdom of Great Britain and Ireland) Jamaica	The ship was driven ashore and damaged in Hodges Bay. She was refloated.

== 10 July ==
List of shipwrecks: 10 July 1845
Ship	State	Description
Jonge Fryntje	Netherlands	The ship was abandoned in the North Sea. Her crew were rescued.

== 11 July ==
List of shipwrecks: 11 July 1845
Ship	State	Description
Aurora	United Kingdom	The ship ran aground at Maryport, Cumberland. She was on a voyage from Belfast, County Antrim to Maryport.
Medjehrai Tidjabret; Scutari	Ottoman Empire	The steamship Medjehrai Tidjabret was in collision with the steamship Scutari and sank in the Black Sea 20 nautical miles (37 km) off the entrance to the Bosphorus with the loss of 124 or 135 lives. She was on a voyage from Trebizond to Constantinople. Scutari was on a voyage from Constantinople to Trebizond. She put back to Constantinople in a severely damaged condition.
Stephen	United Kingdom	The ship ran aground on the Cork Bay Bank, in the Irish Sea.
Waterloo	United Kingdom	The sloop was driven ashore and wrecked at Whitby, Yorkshire. Her crew were rescued.

== 12 July ==
List of shipwrecks: 12 July 1845
Ship	State	Description
Dawden	United Kingdom	The brig was driven ashore and wrecked on Eierland, North Holland, Netherlands. Her crew having been taken off by a pilot boat.
Fatel Rozak	Flag unknown	The barque ran aground off Trinidad. Her crew were rescued by City of Glasgow (United Kingdom). She was subsequently towed in to Trinidad.
Manby	United Kingdom	The ship was driven ashore at Trevose Head, Cornwall. She had become a wreck by 17 July.
Sea Mew	United States	The brigantine ran aground off Cabarita Island, Jamaica. She was on a voyage from Norfolk, Virginia to Port Maria Jamaica. She was refloated and taken in to Port Maria.

== 13 July ==
List of shipwrecks: 13 July 1845
Ship	State	Description
Charles Augustus	France	The ship was in collision with HMS Polythemus (Royal Navy) and sank in the Mediterranean Sea. Her eleven crew were rescued. She was on a voyage from Trieste to Marseille, Bouches-du-Rhône.

== 14 July ==
List of shipwrecks: July 1845
Ship	State	Description
Anna Sophia	Sweden	The ship sprang a leak and was beached at "Kleven", Norway. She was on a voyage from Seaham, County Durham, United Kingdom to Malmö.
Concepcion	Spain	The ship was wrecked on Cayo Gainchos, in the Bahama Banks. Her crew were resccued. She was on a voyage from Santander to Havana, Cuba.
Derwent	United Kingdom	The ship ran aground in the River Wyre. She was on a voyage from Quebec City, Province of Canada, British North America to Fleetwood, Lancashire.

== 15 July ==
List of shipwrecks: 15 July 1845
Ship	State	Description
Jane Maria	United Kingdom	The ship was driven ashore 20 nautical miles (37 km) south of Cape Bon, Beylik of Tunis. She was on a voyage from Alexandria, Egypt to Cork. She was refloated two days later and put in to Malta.

== 16 July ==
List of shipwrecks: 16 July 1845
Ship	State	Description
Navigator	United Kingdom	The ship foundered 2 nautical miles (3.7 km) off Skagen, Denmark. Her crew were rescued. She was on a voyage from Newport, Monmouthshire to Stettin.
Patriot	Stettin	The ship foundered off the coast of Norway.
Sarah	(United Kingdom of Great Britain and Ireland) Isle of Man	The ship ran aground at Ballyshannon, County Donegal.

== 18 July ==
List of shipwrecks: 18 July 1845
Ship	State	Description
Lark	United Kingdom	The ship ran aground and capsized at Axmouth, Devon. She was on a voyage from Neath, Glamorgan to Axmouth. Lark subsequently drove into Iris, damaging that vessel. She was later refloated but found to be severely damaged.
Only daughter	United States	The schooner was run down and sunk off Cape Canso. Crew saved.
Queen	United Kingdom	The steamship was driven ashore and severely damaged at Boddam, Aberdeenshire. Her passengers were evacuated. She was later refloated.

== 19 July ==
List of shipwrecks: 19 July October 1845
Ship	State	Description
HMS Racer	Royal Navy	The Racer-class brig-sloop ran aground on the Chico Bank, in the Atlantic Ocean off the coast of Uruguay. She was refloated.

== 20 July ==
List of shipwrecks: 20 July 1845
Ship	State	Description
Atalanta	United Kingdom	The ship ran aground on a skerry off Stronsay, Orkney Islands. She was later refloated.
Countess of Zetland	United Kingdom	The ship was driven ashore on the north coast of Saltholm, Denmark. She was on a voyage from Grangemouth, Stirlingshire to Saint Petersburg, Russia. She was refloated the next day.
Jeane Sophie	France	The ship was wrecked on "Rarang Poing", Netherlands East Indies. She was on a voyage from Samarang to Jakarta.
Peace	United Kingdom	The ship foundered in the English Channel midway between North Foreland, Kent and West-Cappel, Nord, France. Her crew were rescued. She was on a voyage from Antwerp, Belgium to Alexandria, Egypt.
Witham	United Kingdom	The barque ran aground near Rønne, Denmark. She was on a voyage from Sunderland, County Durham to Saint Petersburg, Russia. She was refloated and resumed her voyage.

== 21 July ==
List of shipwrecks: 21 July 1845
Ship	State	Description
Hesperus	United Kingdom	The schooner capsized and sank at Boston, Massachusetts, United States.

== 22 July ==
List of shipwrecks: 22 July 1845
Ship	State	Description
Enigheden	Netherlands	The ship sank at Saint-Valery-sur-Somme, France.
Mary	United Kingdom	The ship ran aground on the South Bull, in the Irish Sea.

== 23 July ==
List of shipwrecks: 23 July 1845
Ship	State	Description
Countess of Wilton	United Kingdom	The ship was wrecked at Tahiti.
Reward	United Kingdom	The ship was wrecked on the Shoaler Stone, 3 nautical miles (5.6 km) west of Hayle, Cornwall. Her five crew were taken to a boat and survived. She was on a voyage from Plymouth, Devon to Neath, Glamorgan.
Sophia Maria	Sweden	The ship ran aground on a reef off Rønne, Denmark and was damaged. She was refloated.

== 24 July ==
List of shipwrecks: 24 July 1845
Ship	State	Description
Possidone	United Kingdom	The ship was wrecked in the Yangtze River. Her crew were rescued.
St. Charles	France	The ship ran aground on the Petits Charpentiers, off Saint-Malo, Ille-et-Vilaine.
Tarbolton	United Kingdom	The ship was wrecked on Île Brion, Magdalen Islands, Nova Scotia, British North America. Her crew were rescued by Harp (United Kingdom). Tarbolton was on a voyage from Liverpool, Lancashire to Dalhousie, New Brunswick, British North America.
Venus	Kingdom of Hanover	The kuff ran aground on the Klein Vogelsand, in the North Sea. She was on a voyage from Sunderland, County Durham to Altona. She was refloated.

== 25 July ==
List of shipwrecks: 25 July 1845
Ship	State	Description
Governor Doyle	(United Kingdom of Great Britain and Ireland) Grenada	The ship was wrecked at Buesco, Tobago. She was on a voyage from Montreal, Province of Canada, British North America to Barbados.
Highlander	United Kingdom	The ship was driven ashore at Saint Helena. She was consequently condemned.
Indemnity	United Kingdom	The ship was wrecked in the Magdalen Islands, Nova Scotia, British North America with the loss of a crew member. Survivors were rescued by Pearl (United Kingdom).
Jeremiah	United Kingdom	The ship was driven ashore at Valparaíso, Chile. She was refloated.
Rover	United Kingdom	The paddle steamer ran aground on the Swelly Rocks and was severely damaged. She was refloated.

== 26 July ==
List of shipwrecks: 26 July 1845
Ship	State	Description
Arno	United Kingdom	The ship was driven ashore at Southsea, Hampshire. She was on a voyage from Portsmouth, Hampshire to Sunderland, County Durham. She was refloated the next day and resumed her voyage.
Astoria	United Kingdom	The ship was driven ashore in the Sound of Mull. She was on a voyage from Liverpool, Lancashire to Wick, Caithness.
Falco	United States	The brig was wrecked at Table Cape (Kahutara Point), Māhia Peninsula, New Zealand. She was blown over a reef during a heavy storm. Her crew were rescued by the schooner Uncle Sam (United States). She was on a voyage from Port Nicholson to Auckland. The wreck was plundered and burnt by the local inhabitants.
Industry	United Kingdom	The schooner was wrecked near Country Harbour, Nova Scotia, British North America.
John	United Kingdom	The ship ran aground near Kertch, Russia and was damaged.
Pedlar	(United Kingdom of Great Britain and Ireland) Van Diemen's Land	The schooner ran aground off the Shear Beacon. She was refloated but subsequently sank.

== 27 July ==
List of shipwrecks: 27 July 1845
Ship	State	Description
Arno	United Kingdom	The ship was driven ashore at Southsea, Hampshire. She was on a voyage from Portsmouth, Hampshire to Sunderland, County Durham. She was refloated and resumed her voyage.
Diana, The Sovereign, and Victoria	United Kingdom	Diana ran aground at Cardiff, Glamorgan. She was later run into by The Sovereign and Victoria. All three vessels were severely damaged.
Fleuve Loire	France	The ship foundered off Ceará, Brazil. Her crew were rescued. She was on a voyage from Cayenne, French Guiana to Ceará.
Mary	United Kingdom	The ship ran aground on the Filsand, in the Baltic Sea off the coast of Denmark. She was on a voyage from Saint Petersburg, Russia to Newcastle upon Tyne, Northumberland. She was refloated and resumed her voyage.
Star of the West	United Kingdom	The ship was wrecked Punta de Lobos, Alta California, Mexico. Her crew were rescued. She was on a voyage from Liverpool, Lancashire to a Mexican port.
Three Gebroeders	Netherlands	The ship was wrecked near Harlingen, Friesland with the loss of all but one of her crew.

== 28 July ==
List of shipwrecks: 28 July 1845
Ship	State	Description
Empress	United Kingdom	The ship was wrecked on the Jedorn Ledge. She was on a voyage from Portsmouth, Hampshire to Pictou, Nova Scotia, British North America.
Jeune Sophie	France	The ship was wrecked on Karawang Point, Java, Netherlands East Indies. Her crew were rescued.

== 29 July ==
List of shipwrecks: 29 July 1845
Ship	State	Description
Spirit	United Kingdom	The ship capsized at Newport, Monmouthshire. She was later righted.
Trusty	United Kingdom	The ship was damaged by fire off Wainfleet, Lincolnshire.

== 30 July ==
List of shipwrecks: 30 July 1845
Ship	State	Description
Eleonore and Henricke	Belgium	The ship was driven ashore in the Scheldt at Antwerp. She was later refloated.
Euphemia	United Kingdom	The ship ran aground off Kronstadt, Russia. She was refloated the next day.
Glendower	United States	The full-rigged ship was wrecked at Portmadoc, Caernarfonshire, United Kingdom. Her fifteen crew were rescued by a lifeboat.

== 31 July ==
List of shipwrecks: 31 July 1845
Ship	State	Description
Star	United Kingdom	The ship ran aground and was damaged at Aberdeen.

== Unknown date ==
List of shipwrecks: Unknown date in July 1845
Ship	State	Description
Colombia	United Kingdom	The ship was wrecked in the Caspar Straits. All on board were rescued.
Delos	United Kingdom	The ship was wrecked off "Cape Campo" before 10 July. Her crew survived.
HMS Eurydice	Royal Navy	The corvette was driven ashore near the Moro, Havana, Captaincy General of Cuba. She was subsequently refloated and returned to service.
Grenadier	(flag) France	The ship was lost in the Loire.
Isabella	(United Kingdom of Great Britain and Ireland) Van Diemen's Land	The brig was wrecked at Port Albert, New South Wales.
Linnet	United Kingdom	The smack was driven ashore in Aberdaron Bay before 5 July.
Mary	United Kingdom	The ship was driven ashore at Anderby, Lincolnshire. She was refloated on 12 July.
Mary	United Kingdom	The ship collided with the barque New York (United Kingdom and foundered in the Atlantic Ocean. Her crew were rescued by Norval (United Kingdom).
Pedlar	(United Kingdom of Great Britain and Ireland) Van Diemen's Land	The schooner ran aground and sank in George-town Cove before 30 July. She was later refloated and taken in to George-town.
Sam	United Kingdom	The schooner was wrecked in the Lamyet Islands during a typhoon between 12 and 14 July.
Thomas Cutts	United States	The brig foundered in the Atlantic Ocean before 29 July.
Under	United Kingdom	The smack was driven ashore in Aberdaron Bay. She was refloated on 5 July and taken in to Pwllheli, Caernarfonshire.
Vicarage	United Kingdom	The ship was driven ashore at Abererch, Caernarfonshire. She was refloated on 5 July.
Wreath	United Kingdom	The brig was wrecked on a rock in the White Sea before 21 July. Her crew were rescued. She was on a voyage from Arkhangelsk, Russia to Glasgow, Renfrewshire.
