= List of shipwrecks in December 1841 =

The list of shipwrecks in December 1841 includes ships sunk, foundered, wrecked, grounded, or otherwise lost during December 1841.

== 1 December ==
List of shipwrecks: 1 December 1841
Ship	State	Description
Bouvina Hendrika	Stettin	The ship was driven ashore near Varberg, Sweden. She was on a voyage from Stettin to Bordeaux, Gironde. She was later refloated and taken into Gothenburg, Sweden.
British Queen	United Kingdom	The ship was damaged by fire at Antwerp, Belgium.
Maria	Spain	The ship sprang a leak and sank in the Atlantic Ocean off Faro, Portugal. Her crew were rescued. She was on a voyage from Málaga to Rotterdam, South Holland, Netherlands.
Mary Barbara	United Kingdom	The ship was driven ashore near New York City, United States. She was on a voyage from Pictou, Nova Scotia, British North America to New York City. She was refloated and taken into New York.
William	United Kingdom	The brig was driven ashore on Lovett's Island, New York, United States. Her crew were rescued. She was on a voyage from Shelburne, Nova Scotia to Boston, Massachusetts, United States.

== 2 December ==
List of shipwrecks: 2 December 1841
Ship	State	Description
Bonne Adêle	France	The ship was wrecked on the Sienkars Rocks, off Gotland, Sweden with the loss of a crew member.
Cecilia	Hamburg	The ship was driven ashore on Sylt, Duchy of Schleswig. Her crew were rescued. She was on a voyage from Hamburg to Rouen, Seine-Inférieure, France.
Concordia	Stettin	The ship was sighted in the Øresund whilst on a voyage from Stettin to Antwerp, Belgium. Presumed foundered in the North Sea with the loss of all hands; a boat marked Concordia washed up on Vlieland, Friesland, Netherlands.

== 3 December ==
List of shipwrecks: 3 December 1841
Ship	State	Description
Endeavour	United Kingdom	The ship was in collision with Science and foundered in the Atlantic Ocean with the loss of five lives and nine people missing. Nine survivors were rescued by Science. Endeavour was on a voyage from Saint John's, Newfoundland, British North America to "Antigoache".
Glengarry	(United Kingdom of Great Britain and Ireland) Saint Thomas	The barque was wrecked on Grand Turk, in the Turks Islands. Her crew were rescued.
Grenada	United Kingdom	The ship was wrecked at Aden. She was on a voyage from Newcastle upon Tyne, Northumberland to Aden.
Maria	Belgium	The ship ran aground off the Île de Batz, Finistère, France and was damaged. She was on a voyage from Odesa to Antwerp. She was later refloated.
Napoleon	United Kingdom	The brig was driven ashore and wrecked at Shoreham-by-Sea, Sussex. Her crew survived. She was on a voyage from Sunderland, County Durham to Shoreham-by-Sea.
Perseverance	United Kingdom	The ship was wrecked in St Brides Bay. Her crew were rescued. She was on a voyage from Great Yarmouth, Norfolk to Dublin.
St. Alexey	Russia	The ship was wrecked on Copinsay, Orkney Islands, United Kingdom. Her crew were rescued. She was on a voyage from Saint Petersburg to Newry, County Antrim, United Kingdom.
Wilhelmine	Lübeck	The ship ran aground in the Skjelle. She was on a voyage from Hull, Yorkshire, United Kingdom to Lübeck.
Zebina	United Kingdom	The ship was wrecked on Skagen, Denmark. Her crew were rescued. She was on a voyage from Danzig to Aberdeen.

== 4 December ==
List of shipwrecks: 4 December 1841
Ship	State	Description
Anna and Maria	United Kingdom	The sloop was driven ashore and sank at Swansea, Glamorgan.
Crown Prince	Hamburg	The ship was beached at Penarth, Glamorgan, United Kingdom. She was refloated and take into Cardiff, Glamorgan for repairs.
Delphin	Prussia	The ship was driven ashore near "Nixoe". She was refloated and taken into Swinemünde.
Earl of Durham	United Kingdom	The ship ran aground off Penarth and was damaged. She was on a voyage from Cardiff, Glamorgan to Liverpool, Lancashire. She was refloated and put back to Cardiff.
Eliza	United Kingdom	The schooner was run down and sunk in the North Sea off the coast of Norfolk by the brig Condor (United Kingdom). Her crew were rescued by Condor.
Lady Grey	United Kingdom	The ship was driven ashore and severely damaged at Pembroke Dock, Pembrokeshire.
Nancy	United Kingdom	The schooner was run down and sunk in the North Sea of the coast of Norfolk by Jean and Mary (United Kingdom). Her crew were rescued.
Perthshire	United Kingdom	The ship was driven ashore on the north coast of Islay. She was on a voyage from Saint John, New Brunswick, British North America to Greenock, Renfrewshire. Perthshire was refloated on 6 December.
Urgent	United Kingdom	The brig was driven ashore at the mouth of Strangford Lough. She was on a voyage from Dublin to Troon, Ayrshire. She was refloated on 7 December and taken into Belfast, County Antrim.
William	United Kingdom	The ship was driven ashore 4 nautical miles (7.4 km) north of Aberdyfi, Merionethshire. She was on a voyage from "Salwach" to Caernarfon.

== 5 December ==
List of shipwrecks: 5 December 1841
Ship	State	Description
Ada or Adela	United Kingdom	The brig was wrecked on Blanquilla Island, Venezuela. Her crew were rescued. She was on a voyage from Liverpool, Lancashire to Tampico, Mexico.
Adeline	France	The ship capsized off Royan, Charente-Maritime with the loss of all hands. She was on a voyage from Bordeaux to Rotterdam, South Holland, Netherlands.
Alicia	United Kingdom	The brig collided with Frederick (United Kingdom) and foundered off Toward Point, Argyllshire. Her crew were rescued. Alicia was on a voyage from Sligo to Greenock, Renfrewshire.
HMS Avon	Royal Navy	The paddle steamer was driven ashore and damaged near Flamborough Head, Yorkshire. She was later refloated.
Branches	United Kingdom	The barque was wrecked in Saint Tudwal's Islands, Pembrokeshire. Her crew were rescued. She was on a voyage from Liverpool to Savannah, Georgia, United States.
Cavallo Marino	Kingdom of Sardinia	The ship struck the Pearl Rock, off Gibraltar and sank. She was on a voyage from Genoa to Marseille, Bouches-du-Rhône, France and Bahia, Brazil. Cavallo Marino was refloated on 7 December with assistance from HMS Lizard (1840) (Royal Navy) and taken into Gibraltar in a waterlogged condition.
Deux Soeurs	France	The ship was wrecked at the Pointe de La Coubre, Charente-Maritime. She was on a voyage from Bordeaux, Gironde to Rotterdam, South Holland, Netherlands.
Jean and Mary, and Nancy	United Kingdom	Jean and Mary collided with the schooner Nancy off the coast of Suffolk and was consequently beached. Nancy sank, her crew took to the longboat and survived.
Joanna	United Kingdom	The ship struck the Hankley Rock, in the North Sea off the coast of Northumberland and sank.
Perseverance	United Kingdom	The ship was wrecked near Ballycastle, County Antrim. she was on a voyage from Quebec City, Province of Canada, British North America to Larne, County Antrim.
Susan	United Kingdom	The ship was driven ashore at the mouth of the River Dee.

== 6 December ==
List of shipwrecks: 6 December 1841
Ship	State	Description
Astrea	United Kingdom	The ship was wrecked on the north coast of Boa Vista, Cape Verde Islands. She was on a voyage from Liverpool, Lancashire to Montevideo, Uruguay.
Galen	United Kingdom	The ship was abandoned in the Atlantic Ocean off Faial Island, Azores. All on board were rescued. She was on a voyage from Waterford to Boston, Massachusetts, United States.
James	United Kingdom	The ship was driven ashore at Maryport, Cumberland. She was on a voyage from Dublin to Maryport. James was refloated and take into Maryport.
Lord Teignmouth	United Kingdom	The ship ran aground on the Barnard Sand, in the North Sea off the coast of Norfolk and was damaged. She was refloated and taken into Great Yarmouth, Norfolk.
Secret	United Kingdom	The ship was wrecked on Scatarie Island, Newfoundland, British North America. Her crew were rescued.
Susan	United Kingdom	The ship was driven ashore and wrecked at Boulogne-sur-Mer, Pas-de-Calais, France. Her crew were rescued. She was on a voyage from Manila, Spanish East Indies to London.

== 7 December ==
List of shipwrecks: 7 December 1841
Ship	State	Description
Alert, and Defiance	United Kingdom	The smack Defiance was run into and sunk off Cromer, Norfolk by Alert. Her crew were rescued by Alert, which was consequently beached at Mundesley, Norfolk.
Archibald	United Kingdom	The ship was driven ashore near Calais, France. She was on a voyage from Carmel to Dunkirk, Nord, France. Archibald had become a wreck by 17 December.
Erin	United Kingdom	The ship foundered in the Atlantic Ocean. Her crew were rescued by Campechano (flag unknown). Erin was on a voyage from Londonderry to Savannah, Georgia, United states.
Erin-go-Bragh	United Kingdom	The ship was abandoned in the Atlantic Ocean. All 21 people on board were rescued by Roscius (United Kingdom). Erin-go-Bragh was on a voyage from Quebec City, Province of Canada, British North America to Liverpool, Lancashire.
Jeune Auguste	France	The ship was driven ashore near Calais. She was on a voyage from Sunderland, County Durham, United Kingdom to Bordeaux, Gironde.
Radford	United Kingdom	The ship was driven ashore near Calais. She was on a voyage from Newcastle upon Tyne, Northumberland to Portsmouth, Hampshire. Radford was later refloated and taken into Calais.

== 8 December ==
List of shipwrecks: 8 December 1841
Ship	State	Description
Isabella	United Kingdom	The ship was driven ashore on Cape Sable Island, Nova Scotia, British North America. Her crew were rescued. She was on a voyage from Curaçao to Halifax, Nova Scotia.

== 9 December ==
List of shipwrecks: 9 December 1841
Ship	State	Description
Caroline	Hamburg	The ship was wrecked on Scharhörn. Her crew were rescued. She was on a voyage from Málaga, Spain to Hamburg.
Cato	United Kingdom	The ship was wrecked north of Sunderland, County Durham with the loss of all hands.
Grace	United Kingdom	The ship was beached 3 nautical miles (5.6 km) north of Maryport, Cumberland. She was on a voyage from Dumfries to Maryport. Grace was refloated on 16 December and put back to Dumfries.
Hannah	United Kingdom	The ship ran aground near Helsingør, Denmark. She was on a voyage from Saint Petersburg, Russia to Hull, Yorkshire. She was refloated and taken into Helsingør for repairs.
Isabella	United Kingdom	The ship ran aground on the East Barrow Sand, in the North Sea off the coast of Essex. She was on a voyage from London to Bristol, Gloucestershire. Isabella was refloated and resumed her voyage.
Junge George	Hamburg	The ship ran aground off Heligoland. She was on a voyage from an English port to Hamburg. Junge George was refloated and taken into Cuxhaven.
Kent	United Kingdom	The ship was driven ashore at Dungeness, Kent.
Lord Nelson	United Kingdom	The ship was wrecked on the Black Shaw Bank with the loss of all hands. She was on a voyage from Carlisle, Cumberland to Greenock, Renfrewshire.
Nancy	United Kingdom	The ship was run aground and was severely damaged at Guernsey, Channel Islands. She was on a voyage from Havana, Cuba to Guernsey.
Sherwood	United States	The ship ran aground on rocks off Sark, Channel Islands and was abandoned by her fourteen crew. She was on a voyage from New Orleans, Louisiana to Cowes, Isle of Wight, United Kingdom. Sherwood subsequently floated off and drifted towards Jersey.
William and Margaret	United Kingdom	The ship was wrecked north of Sunderland. Her crew were rescued.

== 10 December ==
List of shipwrecks: 10 December 1841
Ship	State	Description
Beulah	United Kingdom	The ship was driven ashore near Woodbridge, Suffolk. She was on a voyage from Stockton-on-Tees, County Durham to Woodbridge. She was refloated on 13 December and taken into Woodbridge.
Defiance	United Kingdom	The ship collided with the schooner Alert and foundered in the North Sea off Cromer, Norfolk.
Fleurs	United Kingdom	The ship was wrecked on Tiree, Outer Hebrides. She was on a voyage from Liverpool, Lancashire to Puerto Rico.
John	United Kingdom	The ship was driven ashore at Shoeburyness, Essex. She was on a voyage from Saint Petersburg, Russian Empire to London.John was refloated the next day and towed into London.
Juno	France	The ship capsized in the Seine. Her crew were rescued.
Perseverance	United Kingdom	The ship was wrecked in Jack Sound with the loss of three of her four crew. She was on a voyage from Yarmouth, Isle of Wight to Dublin.
Stad Zierikzee	Netherlands	The ship was driven ashore at Veere, Zeeland. She had become a wreck by 18 December.
Unicorn	United Kingdom	The brig was wrecked at the mouth of the Seine near Le Havre, Seine-Inférieure, France. Her crew were rescued.

== 11 December ==
List of shipwrecks: 11 December 1841
Ship	State	Description
Elbe	United States	The whaler was driven ashore at Palliser Bay, New Zealand while en route for Wellington during a storm (the same storm which wrecked the Winwick (qv)). Her crew were rescued.
Fanny	Sweden	The brig was wrecked on the Ooster Bank, in the North Sea off the coast of Zeeland, Netherlands with the loss of one of her ten crew. She was on a voyage from Hul, Yorkshire, United Kingdom to St. Ubes, Portugal.
Lynch	United Kingdom	The ship was driven ashore at Llanmaddoc, Glamorgan. Her crew were rescued.
Para	Russian Empire	The ship was driven ashore near Boulogne-sur-Mer, Pas-de-Calais, France with the loss of her captain. She was on a voyage from Smyrna, Ottoman Empire to Saint Petersburg.
Publican	United Kingdom	The schooner was driven ashore east of Calais, France. Her crew were rescued by the Calais Lifeboat. She was on a voyage from Great Yarmouth, Norfolk to Waterford.
Queen	United Kingdom	The brig collided with a barque and foundered in the North Sea off the coast of Yorkshire with the loss of three of her crew. Survivors were rescued by a fishing smack.
Wasdelmo	Empire of Brazil	The ship was driven onto the Tartarugas Rocks, off Pernambuco and was damaged. She was refloated and put back to Pernambuco.
Winwick	United Kingdom	The barque was driven ashore in Lyall Bay, while en route from Kapiti Island to Wellington, with the loss of one life.
Zephire	France	The sloop was driven ashore on the Île d'Yeu, Vendée. Her crew were rescued.

== 12 December ==
List of shipwrecks: 12 December 1841
Ship	State	Description
Emma	United Kingdom	The ship was driven ashore near "Welsinggen", Zeeland, Netherlands. She was on a voyage from Riga, Russia to Antwerp, Belgium.
Erie	United States	The whaler was wrecked in Palliser Bay, New Zealand. Her crew survived.
Middlesex	(United Kingdom of Great Britain and Ireland) New South Wales	The ship struck a rock and was severely damaged at Wellington, New Zealand. She was on a voyage from Sydney to Wellington.
Rapid	(United Kingdom of Great Britain and Ireland) Guernsey	The schooner was driven ashore and wrecked on Texel North Holland, Netherlands with the loss of two of her four crew. She was on a voyage from Danzig to Guernsey.
Rosamond and Jane	United Kingdom	The ship was driven ashore in the River Loughor. She was on a voyage from Swansea to Llanelly, Glamorgan.Rosamund and Jane was refloated on 15 December.
Simon Bolivar	United Kingdom	The ship capsized in the Dogger Bank and was abandoned the next day. Her crew were rescued. She was on a voyage from Plymouth, Devon to the River Tyne.
William and Fanny	United Kingdom	The ship sprang a leak and foundered in the English Channel off Poole, Dorset. Her crew were rescued. She was on a voyage from Swanage to Weymouth, Dorset.
Winwick	(United Kingdom of Great Britain and Ireland) New Zealand	The barque was wrecked in Lyall Bay.

== 13 December ==
List of shipwrecks: 13 December 1841
Ship	State	Description
Caldeonia	United Kingdom	The sloop foundered in the Irish Sea off Maughold Head, Isle of Man. Her crew were rescued. She was on a voyage from Ramsey, Isle of Man to Liverpool, Lancashire.
Edenbank	United Kingdom	The brig was wrecked at "Carabournow", Ottoman Empire. Her crew survived She was on a voyage from Newcastle upon Tyne, Northumberland to Odesa.
Euclid	United Kingdom	The ship sprang a leak and foundered off the Goodwin Sands, Kent. Her crew were rescued. She was on a voyage from Port Dundas, Renfrewshire to Dunkirk, Nord, France.
Hazard	United Kingdom	The ship was driven ashore at Port Fleetwood, Lancashire. She was on a voyage from Strangford, County Antrim to Maryport, Cumberland.
Lapwing	United Kingdom	The ship was discovered off the coast of Essex waterlogged and abandoned, crew presumed lost. She was towed into Wivenhoe in a waterlogged condition.
Liddell	United Kingdom	The ship was driven ashore and severely damaged at Happisburgh, Norfolk. She was refloated on 30 December and taken into Great Yarmouth.
Sverre	Belgium	The ship ran aground at Sulina, Ottoman Empire. She was on a voyage from Antwerp to Ismalia, Ottoman Empire.
Thetis	France	The ship ran aground, capsized and sank at Dunkirk, Nord. She was on a voyage from Odesa to Dunkirk. Thetis was refloated on 18 December and taken into Dunkirk.
Union	United Kingdom	The ship ran aground and was severely damaged near Blyth, Northumberland. She was later refloated and taken into Blyth.

== 14 December ==
List of shipwrecks: 14 December 1841
Ship	State	Description
Agenoria	United Kingdom	The ship was driven ashore at Beaumaris, Anglesey. She was on a voyage from Quebec City, Province of Canada, British North America to Bangor, Caernarfonshire.
Catherine	United Kingdom	The ship was driven ashore on Gribben Head, Cornwall. She was refloated and resumed her voyage to Belfast, County Antrim.
Comsopolite	Belgium	The ship was driven ashore on the coast of Prussia. She was on a voyage from Memel, Prussia to Antwerp. Cosmopolite was refloated and put into Danzig in a leaky condition.
Dorothea	Hamburg	The ship was wrecked on the Eyerland Banks, in the North Sea off Texel, North Holland, Netherlands. Her crew were rescued. She was on a voyage from Hamburg to La Guaira, Venezuela.
Elizabeth	United Kingdom	The ship ran aground on the Corton Flats, in the North Sea off the coast of Suffolk. She was on a voyage from Newcastle upon Tyne, Northumberland to Rouen, Seine-Inférieure, France. She was refloated on 17 December and taken into Great Yarmouth, Norfolk in a leaky condition.
Emilie	United Kingdom	The ship was driven ashore at Fishguard, Pembrokeshire. She was on a voyage from Belfast, County Antrim to Caen, Calvados, France.
Flora	Bremen	The ship was driven ashore near Kastrup, Denmark. She was on a voyage from Bremen to Stettin. She was refloated and taken intoCopenhagen, Denmark.
John	United Kingdom	The ship was driven ashore near Boulogne, Pas-de-Calais, France. She was on a voyage from Cork to London. John was refloated and taken into Boulogne.
Kremlin	Flag unknown	The ship was driven ashore at Gibraltar She was on a voyage from Livorno, Grand Duchy of Tuscany to New York, United States. She was refloated and put under repair.
Union	United Kingdom	The ship was driven ashore at Blyth, Northumberland and was severely damaged. She was on a voyage from Blyth to London. Union was refloated and towed into Blyth.

== 15 December ==
List of shipwrecks: 15 December 1841
Ship	State	Description
Friends	United Kingdom	The brig was driven ashore and wrecked at Newhaven, Sussex. Her crew survived. She was on a voyage from Sunderland, County Durham to Newhaven. Friends was refloated on 18 December and taken into Newhaven.
Friends Goodwill	United Kingdom	The ship foundered in the North Sea. Her crew were rescued. She was on a voyage from King's Lynn, Norfolk to London.
Jane	United Kingdom	The brig was driven ashore and wrecked at Newhaven. Her crew survived. She was on a voyage from Sunderland to Newhaven. Jane was refloated on 23 December and taken into Newhaven.
John	United Kingdom	The ship was driven ashore near Boulogne, Pas-de-Calais, France. She was on a voyage from Cork to London. John was refloated' and taken into Boulogne.
Jonge Jan	Netherlands	The ship was wrecked on the Hinder Bank, in the North Sea. Her crew were rescued. She was on a voyage from Newcastle upon Tyne, Northumberland, United Kingdom to Toulon, Var, France.
Lively	United Kingdom	The ship was driven ashore on Hare Island. She was on a voyage from Quebec City, Province of Canada, British North America to Galway. She was refloated on 1 January 1842.
Silistria	Russia	The schooner ran aground on the Debenigo. She was on a voyage from Hull, Yorkshire, United Kingdom to St. Ubes, Portugal. She was refloated.
Suir	United Kingdom	The ship ran aground on the Hooper Sand, in the Bristol Channel. She was on a voyage from Quebec City Province of Canada, British North America to Llanelly, Glamorgan. Suir was refloated on 16 December and taken into Llanelly.

== 16 December ==
List of shipwrecks: 16 December 1841
Ship	State	Description
Andrew White	United Kingdom	The ship collided with a barque and was beached west of Porthdinllaen, Caernarfonshire. She was on a voyage from Montreal, Province of Canada, British North America to Liverpool, Lancashire.
Cambria	United Kingdom	The ship was driven ashore and wrecked near Exmouth, Devon. Her crew were rescued.
Hebble	United Kingdom	The ship foundered in the English Channel 10 nautical miles (19 km) south east of Beachy Head, Sussex. Her crew were rescued. She was on a voyage from Newcastle upon Tyne, Northumberland to Le Havre, Seine-Inférieure, France.
Langton	United Kingdom	The ship was driven ashore and wrecked at Almería, Spain. Her crew were rescued. She was on a voyage from Malta to Liverpool.
Peace	United Kingdom	The ship was driven ashore and wrecked north of Arklow, County Wicklow. She was on a voyage from Dublin to Wexford.

== 17 December ==
List of shipwrecks: 17 December 1841
Ship	State	Description
Arab	United Kingdom	The ship ran aground on the Newcombe Sand, in the North Sea off the coast of Norfolk. She was refloated and put into Dover, Kent in a leaky condition. Arab was on a voyage from South Shields to Galway.
Bristol Packet	United Kingdom	The ship was run down and sunk by a schooner off Land's End, Cornwall. She was on a voyage from Bristol, Gloucestershire to Penzance and Falmouth, Cornwall.
Mohawk	United States	The ship was wrecked at Point Allerton, Massachusetts. Her crew were rescued. She was on a voyage from Liverpool, Lancashire to Boston, Massachusetts.

== 18 December ==
List of shipwrecks: 18 December 1841
Ship	State	Description
Alva	(United Kingdom of Great Britain and Ireland) British North America	The barque was abandoned in the Atlantic Ocean. All on board were rescued by Girard (United States). Alva was on a voyage from Dorchester, New Brunswick, British North America to Cork.
Andrew White	United Kingdom	The ship was in collision with the barque Grange (United Kingdom) and was consequently beached at Porthdinllaen, Anglesey. All but three of her crew were rescued by Grange, the remainder stayed on board. Andrew White was on a voyage from Quebec City, Province of Canada, British North America to Liverpool, Lancashire. She was refloated on 20 December.
Duchess of Gloucester	United Kingdom	The ship capsized at Sligo. She was on a voyage from Sligo to Liverpool. She was subsequently righted and repaired.
Friendship	United Kingdom	The ship was driven ashore in Clew Bay. She was on a voyage from the Clyde to Jamaica. She was refloated on 2 January 1842.
Maria	Belgium	The ship was wrecked on Point Barbero, Ottoman Empire. Her crew were rescued. She was on a voyage from Antwerp to Constantinople and Smyrna, Ottoman Empire.
Susception	Prussia	The ship was abandoned off Skagen, Denmark. Her crew were rescued. She subsequently driven ashore at "Gasa", Sweden.

== 19 December ==
List of shipwrecks: 19 December 1841
Ship	State	Description
Albano	Spain	The ship ran aground on Goat Island, Rhode Island, United States. She was on a voyage from Málaga to New York, United States. Albano was refloated the next day and taken into Newport, Rhode Island.
Coquette	United Kingdom	The barque was wrecked on the north coast of "Calongonk".
Longton	United Kingdom	The ship was driven ashore and wrecked at Cerillos, Spain. Her crew were rescued. She was on a voyage from Malta to Liverpool, Lancashire.
William Foster	United Kingdom	The ship was wrecked on the Bell Rock, off the Ragged Islands, Newfoundland, British North America with the loss of two of her crew. She was on a voyage from Liverpool, Lancashire to Saint John, New Brunswick, British North America.

== 20 December ==
List of shipwrecks: 20 December 1841
Ship	State	Description
Godfrey	United Kingdom	The ship was driven ashore near Ballywalter, County Down. She was on a voyage from Belfast, County Antrim to Caen, Calvados, France. Godfrey was refloated and resumed her voyage.
Hanna	United Kingdom	The ship ran aground and was damaged at Riga, Russia. She was later refloated.
St. Oswald	United Kingdom	The steamship sprang a leak and sank in the North Sea. Her crew were rescued by the Barking smack Ceres (United Kingdom). She was on a voyage from Rotterdam, South Holland, Netherlands to Sunderland, County Durham.
William Salthouse	United Kingdom	The ship struck rocks off Point Nepean, New South Wales and was beached. She was on a voyage from Montreal, Province of Canada, British North America to the Cape of Good Hope and Port Phillip, New South Wales.

== 21 December ==
List of shipwrecks: 21 December 1841
Ship	State	Description
Lighter	United Kingdom	The schooner was driven ashore on Thompson's Island, Pennsylvania, United States. She was on a voyage from Boston, Massachusetts, to "Cornwallis".

== 22 December ==
List of shipwrecks: 22 December 1841
Ship	State	Description
America	United States	The ship foundered in the Atlantic Ocean off Sandy Hook, New Jersey. Her crew were rescued. She was on a voyage from Trapani, Sicily to New York.
Governor Arthur	United Kingdom	The steamship caught fire and sank at Port Phillip, South Australia.
Johanna	Netherlands	The ship was wrecked on Eierland, North Holland with the loss of a crew member. She was on a voyage from Groningen to London, United Kingdom.
Taletta	Netherlands	The ship foundered off the mouth of the Weser. She was on a voyage from Hamburg to Amsterdam, North Holland.
Theodosia	United Kingdom	The ship ran aground at Helsingør, Denmark. She was on a voyage from Saint Petersburg, Russia to Hull, Yorkshire. She was refloated the next day and proceeded on her voyage the day after.

== 23 December ==
List of shipwrecks: 23 December 1841
Ship	State	Description
General Evans	United Kingdom	The full-rigged ship was wrecked on a reef off the coast of Sierra Leone. All twelve people on board survived.
Royal Sovereign	United Kingdom	The ship was driven ashore at Bawdsey, Suffolk. She was on a voyage from Leith, Lothian to London. Royal Sovereign was refloated and resumed her voyage.

== 24 December ==
List of shipwrecks: 24 December 1841
Ship	State	Description
Arcturus	United Kingdom	The ship was wrecked on Walney Island, Lancashire. She was on a voyage from Limerick to Preston, Lancashire.
Friendship	United Kingdom	The schooner was driven ashore and severely damaged on Scalpa. She was refloated on 3 January 1842 and taken into Stromness, Orkney Islands.
Jules	Belgium	The ship ran aground in the Grijalva River and was abandoned by her crew. She was on a voyage from Antwerp to Tabasco, Mexico.
Lively	United Kingdom	The ship was driven ashore on Hare Island, County Galway.
Wave	United States	The schooner was driven ashore. She was refloated on 29 December.

== 25 December ==
List of shipwrecks: 25 December 1841
Ship	State	Description
Briton	United Kingdom	The ship ran aground, capsized and was wrecked at Redcar, Yorkshire. Her crew were rescued. She was on a voyage from Woolwich, Kent to Hartlepool, County Durham.
Commerce	United Kingdom	The ship was driven ashore near Boulmer, Northumberland. She was on a voyage from London to Berwick upon Tweed, Northumberland. She was later refloated.
Friendship	United Kingdom	The ship was driven ashore and severely damaged in Scasset Bay, Orkney Islands.
Rosiana	Spain	The polacca was run down and sunk off Cape Palos by a Swedish vessel. Her crew were rescued by Patriot (United Kingdom).

== 26 December ==
List of shipwrecks: 26 December 1841
Ship	State	Description
Brandon	French Navy	The Sphinx-class aviso was wrecked at Mahón, Minorca, Spain.
Fancy	United Kingdom	The ship sprang a leak and foundered in the North Sea 12 nautical miles (22 km) east of Whitby, Yorkshire. Her crew survived. She was on a voyage from Sunderland, County Durham to London.
Rival	United Kingdom	The ship was wrecked north of Rio Grande do Norte, Brazil. She was on a voyage from Liverpool, Lancashire to Rio Grade do Norte.
William	United Kingdom	The ship was driven ashore at Goat Point. She was on a voyage from Hull, Yorkshire to Grangemouth, Stirlingshire. She was refloated and resumed her voyage.
Vestal	United Kingdom	The ship departed from Ramsgate, Kent for Saint John's, Newfoundland, British North America. No further trace, presumed foundered with the loss of all hands.

== 27 December ==
List of shipwrecks: 27 December 1841
Ship	State	Description
Ann	United Kingdom	The schooner was in collision with a brig in the North Sea. She put into Hartlepool, County Durham on 29 December in a sinking condition.
Cæsar	(United Kingdom of Great Britain and Ireland) Jersey	The ship was driven ashore at Ramsgate, Kent.
Elizabeth	United Kingdom	The ship departed from Newfoundland, British North America for Liverpool, Lancashire. No further trace, presumed foundered with the loss of all hands.

== 29 December ==
List of shipwrecks: 29 December 1841
Ship	State	Description
Agnes	United Kingdom	The ship foundered south of Menorca, Spain. Her crew were rescued. She was on a voyage from Marseille, Bouches-du-Rhône, France to Falmouth, Cornwall.
Brandon	French Navy	The steamship was wrecked at Mahón, Menorca with the loss of four of her crew. She was on a voyage from Toulon, Var, France to Mahón.
Sovereign	(United Kingdom of Great Britain and Ireland) Cape Colony	The schooner was wrecked at Knysna. Her crew were rescued.

== 30 December ==
List of shipwrecks: 30 December 1841
Ship	State	Description
Agnes	United Kingdom	The schooner was wrecked on the south coast of Minorca, Spain. Her crew were rescued. She was on a voyage from Marseille, Bouches-du-Rhône, France to Falmouth, Cornwall.
François	France	The ship was driven ashore at Málaga, Spain. Her crew were rescued.
Nerio	(United Kingdom of Great Britain and Ireland) New South Wales	The barque ran aground off Point Nepean. She was refloated on 1 January 1842.
Trim	United Kingdom	The ship was wrecked on the Bondicar Rocks, in the North Sea off the coast of Northumberland. Her crew were rescued.

== 31 December ==
List of shipwrecks: 31 December 1841
Ship	State	Description
Arcturus	United Kingdom	The brig ran aground and sank at Pile Foundry, Lancashire. She was on a voyage from Limerick to Glasson Dock, Lancashire.
Belvedere	United Kingdom	The ship ran aground on the Burbo Bank, in Liverpool Bay. She was on a voyage from Liverpool, Lancashire to Bombay, India. Belvedere was refloated and put back to Liverpool.
Deux Frères	France	The brig was driven ashore on the coast of Algeria. She was later refloated and taken into Algiers.
Eliza	France	The ship was driven ashore at Buenos Aires, Argentina.
Flora	United Kingdom	The ship was driven ashore and wrecked at San Cataldo di Lecce, Kingdom of the Two Sicilies. Her crew were rescued. She was on a voyage from Ancona, Papal States to London.
Guiletta	Kingdom of Sardinia	The brig sank at Algiers.
Petit Emanuel	France	The brig was driven ashore near Cape Mustapha, Algeria. Her crew were rescued. She was on a voyage from Naples, Kingdom of the Two Sicilies to Dunkirk, Nord.

== Unknown date ==
List of shipwrecks: Unknown date in December 1841
Ship	State	Description
Albano	Spain	The ship was driven ashore on Goat Island, Rhode Island, United States. She was on a voyage from Málaga to New York. She was refloated the next day and taken into Newport, Rhode Island.
Antaces	United Kingdom	The ship was driven ashore. She was on voyage from Belfast, County Antrim to Salem, Massachusetts, United States.
Cleopatra	United Kingdom	The ship was driven ashore at Hayle, Cornwall. She was on a voyage from Newport, Monmouthshire to Rouen, Seine-Inférieure, France. She was refloated on 21 December.
Clorinde	United Kingdom	The ship was driven ashore at St. Ives, Cornwall. She was on a voyage from Newport to Rouen. She was refloated on 21 December.
Crystal	United Kingdom	The brig was abandoned in the Atlantic Ocean before 5 December.
Dos Hermanos or Tres Hermanos	Spain	The ship was wrecked on the Mandara Rocks, off coast of Spain. She was on a voyage from La Guaira, Venezuela to Santander.
E. & L.	Prussia	The ship was abandoned in the Atlantic Ocean before 30 December.
Eolo	Hamburg	The ship was destroyed by fire at a Spanish port before 6 December. She was on a voyage from Havana, Cuba to Hamburg.
Fortescue	United Kingdom	The barque was wrecked in the Strait of Malacca.
Fortune	Netherlands	The ship sprang a leak and was beached on Gotland, Sweden, where she was wrecked. She was on a voyage from Amsterdam, North Holland to Christianstadt, Sweden.
Georgian	United Kingdom	The ship was wrecked near "Caragica" before 17 December. She was on a voyage from Odesa to Cork.
Grenadier	United Kingdom	The ship was driven ashore at St. Ives, Cornwall. She was on a voyage from Newport, Monmouthshire to Rouen, Seine-Inférieure, France. Grenadier was refloated on 25 December and taken into St.Ives.
Helsingfors	(Russian Empire) Grand Duchy of Finland	The ship ran aground and was damaged at "Kleven", Norway. She was on a voyage from Helsingfors to Antwerp, Belgium.
Inez	United Kingdom	The ship ran aground in the Strait ofMalacca and was consequently beached at Singapore. She was on a voyage from China to Madras, India.
Lapwing	United Kingdom	The ship was abandoned in the North Sea. She was taken into Great Yarmouth, Norfolk, where she arrived on 13 December.
Lina	Sweden	The ship was driven ashore near the mouth of the Ebro.
Marie	France	The ship was driven ashore on Great Heneaga, Bahamas. She was on a voyage from Cartagena, Republic of New Grenada to Dunkirk, Nord. She was refloated and taken into Nassau, Bahamas, where she arrived on 1 January 1842.
Mary	(United Kingdom of Great Britain and Ireland) British North America	The ship foundered in the Bristol Channel on or before 14 December.
Mary	United States	The ship was driven ashore and wrecked on Morris Island, South Carolina. She was on a voyage from Charleston, South Carolina to Saint Helena.
Medusa	United Kingdom	The ship ran aground and was damaged at Larache, Morocco. she was on a voyage from Larache to Cork.
Memoria Parentum	Sweden	The ship was driven ashore near the mouth of the Ebro.
Ocean de Havre	France	The ship was driven ashore at Old Harbour Bay, Jamaica before 4 December. All on board were rescued. She was on a voyage from Le Havre, Seine-Inférieure to New Orleans, Louisiana, United States.
Pera	Russia	The ship was driven ashore at Saint-Valery-sur-Somme, France before 13 December and was subsequently wrecked. She was on a voyage from Smyrna, Ottoman Empire to Saint Petersburg.
Perseverance	United Kingdom	The brig was driven ashore in Collier Bay, County Londonderry. Her crew were rescued. She was on a voyage from Quebec City, Province of Canada, British North America to Larne, County Antrim.
Pomona	United Kingdom	The ship ran aground and was damaged on the Bembridge Ledge off the Isle of Wight. She was on a voyage from Portsmouth, Hampshire to Faial Island, Azores. Pomona was refloated on 24 December and put back to Portsmouth.
Reporter	United Kingdom	The brig was abandoned in the Atlantic Ocean before 9 December.
Republican	United Kingdom	The ship was driven ashore near Calais, France.She was on a voyage from Yarmouth, Isle of Wight to Waterford. Republichanwas refloated on 17 December and taken into Calais.'
Sarah Sheafe	United States	The ship foundered in the North Sea on or before 27 December. She was on a voyage from Antwerp, Belgium to New York.
Savannah	United States	The steamship sprang a leak and foundered in the Atlantic Ocean off Cape Hatteras, North Carolina. Some of those on board were rescued by a brig. Savannah was on a voyage from New York to New Orleans, Louisiana.
Sesostris	United Kingdom	The brig was driven ashore on the east coast of Spain. She was later refloated.
Sherwood	United Kingdom	The ship struck rocks off Sark, Channel Islands and was abandoned by her crew before 7 December. She was on a voyage from New Orleans, Louisiana, United States to Cowes, Isle of Wight.
Stair	United Kingdom	The ship was driven ashore at Bacton, Norfolk. She was refloated on 8 December and taken into Great Yarmouth, Norfolk.
Urgent	United Kingdom	The ship was driven ashore in Strangford Lough. She was on a voyage from Dublin to Troon, Ayrshire. Urgent was refloated on 7 December and taken into Belfast, County Antrim.
