= Francis Spaight =

19th-century transport ship

Francis Spaight was a transport ship in the 19th century, owned by and named after a merchant based in Limerick, Ireland. The ship was engaged in trade with North America, such as transporting Irish emigrants to North America and transporting timber on the return trip. Francis Spaight became infamous for an incident of cannibalism.

She was built in 1835 in Sunderland, UK, by G W Hall & Bros.

== Wreck and cannibalism incident 1835 ==
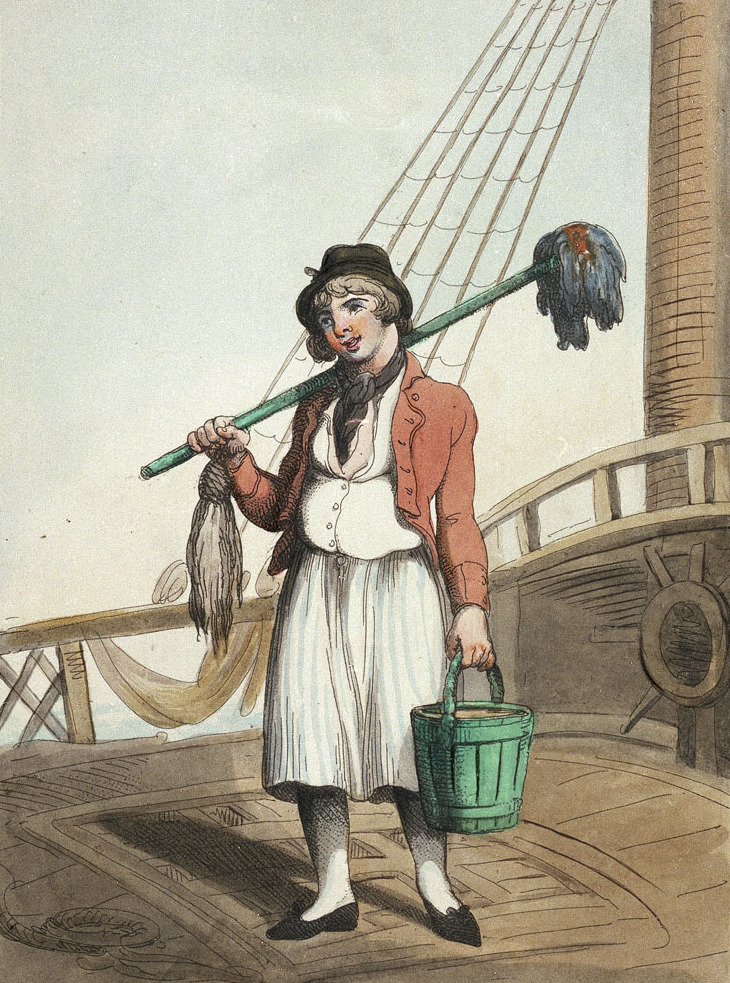
1799 illustration of a cabin boy. On Francis Spaight, the ship's four cabin boys were submitted to a lottery, which resulted in one of them being killed and eaten by the rest of the crew.

On 3 December 1835, the ship broached to off the coast of Canada in a snow storm, washing away all the provisions and fouling the water stores. Of the 18 crewmen, three were thrown overboard during the accident and 15 survived, including four young crewmen in their teens.

With only rain water and bottles of wine, the crewmen endured severe cold, dehydration and hunger until 18 December, when the captain suggested they sacrifice one of the four young crewmen to survive. The captain justified exclusion of other older crewmen by the fact that they had families depending on them. The four boys cast lots and Patrick O'Brien, a fifteen-year-old cabin boy, drew the death lot. Captain ordered the cook to kill O'Brien; the cook initially refused but was later forced to do so by the captain. However, the cook failed in killing O'Brien. O'Brien attempted to kill himself by cutting his own wrist, but his attempt also failed. In the end, the captain resorted to cutting O'Brien's throat, at which point O'Brien resisted but was killed. The surviving crewmen cannibalised O'Brien for three days until the 20th, when an adult crewman, Michael Behane, and another cabin boy, George Burns, became deranged from dehydration and hunger. They were also cannibalised, in addition to another crewman who died on the same day.

When the surviving crewmen were about to draw another lot for cannibalism, they were spotted by the Newfoundland vessel Angerona. The crewmen were waving hands and feet of cannibalised victims to express their plight. After being stranded for twenty days, 11 crewmen survived out of 18. Three died due to the snow storm, and four had been cannibalised. Aboard the Angerona, the survivors were so emaciated and malnourished that they couldn't feed themselves without help.

== Recovery and refit ==
Francis Spaight was initially abandoned, but subsequently recovered and towed to England, where it was refitted during 1837, and reregistered on 7 January 1838. Then resold, and remeasured later in the year with new owners, and registered again 8 August 1838. The incident and ship were among shipwrecks enquired about before a Parliamentary Select Committee in 1836 and 1839.

Francis Spaight set sail for Sydney on 15 August 1838, under the command of Captain Sayers, arriving in Sydney on 31 December 1838. That voyage was recorded in the personal diary of one of the passengers, John Hume, who was emigrating from Scotland to Australia. Passengers included Mary Baptist De Lacy and four other Sisters of Charity, the first nuns to arrive in Australia.

She was used for the kauri trade in New Zealand during 1839–1840. Under Captain N. Sayers, she entered Hokianga Harbour from Sydney via the Bay of Islands prior to 28 November 1839 and departed for England about 10 January 1840.

== Subsequent wreck and destruction ==
Francis Spaight broke from her anchor during a gale, and driven ashore, in Table Bay, near the Cape of Good Hope, on 7 January 1846. A whaler with six crew members rowed to the rescue of the Francis Spaight's crew of fifteen. The ship's carpenter declined to board the whaler, but ultimately survived. However, the whaler subsequently capsized, and of the 20 people it had on board, all but one drowned.

== See also ==
- Cannibalism at sea

== Sources ==
- Simpson, A. W. B. (1994). Cannibalism and the Common Law. The Hambledon Press. ISBN 1-85285-200-3.
