= Cannibalism at sea =

Cannibalism at sea was occasionally practiced in extreme cases of disaster, when there was not enough food for the survivors. Traditionally such cannibalism among shipwrecked survivors was considered acceptable as a last resort, provided that corpses were eaten or that lots were drawn to decide who would be killed and eaten so that the others might survive.

== Traditional rules for survival cannibalism among sailors ==
This specific custom, also known as "the delicate question" or "the proper tradition of the sea", specified that in case of disaster, when there was not enough food for the survivors, corpses could be eaten. If "there were no bodies available for consumption, lots were drawn to determine who would be sacrificed to provide food for the others". As long as the lottery was fair, giving everyone an equal risk of dying to become food for others, this was considered "entirely legal" and justified by the circumstances. "On the whole, sailors and the general public knew and accepted [this] protocol of cannibalism to survive ship disasters."

The legal historian A. W. Brian Simpson observed:

If properly conducted, cannibalism was legitimated by a custom of the sea; and the popular literature, augmented by the unrecorded tales seamen told each other, ensured that there was general understanding of what had to be done on these occasions and that survivors who had followed the custom could have a certain professional pride in a job well done; there was nothing to hide.

Referring to William Arens' widely-read book The Man-Eating Myth, he added that, since "maritime survival cannibalism, preceded by the drawing of lots and killing, was a socially accepted practice among seamen until the end of the days of sail ... it is ... not an exception but a counterexample" to Arens' thesis "that cannibalism, as a socially accepted practice, is a myth".

The only cases when cannibalism in maritime disasters sometimes led to legal prosecution was "when the lotteries were fixed or absent altogether", in violation of the accepted custom. Such violations were nevertheless common enough. Captains and other crew members were often unwilling to put their own lives at risk, as the rules of the custom demanded, instead choosing to sacrifice those they considered "more expendable ... (such as slaves, young boys, and passengers)" to serve as food for the other survivors.

== End of the cannibal custom ==
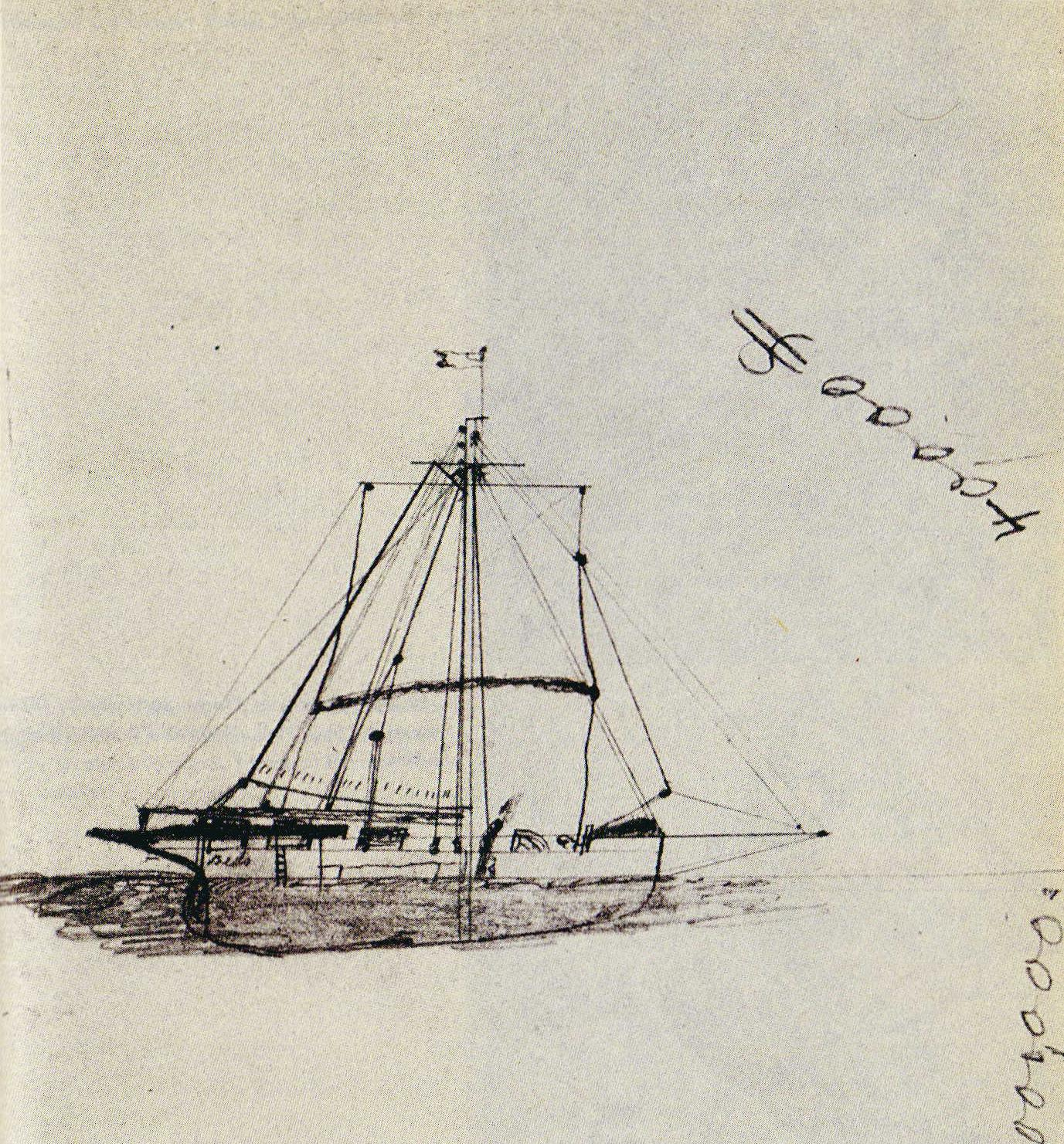
Sketch of the Mignonette by Tom Dudley

The case of R v Dudley and Stephens (1884 14 QBD 273 DC) is an English case that developed a crucial ruling on necessity in modern common law, at the same time ending the custom of lot drawing and cannibalism. Accused were two crew members of an English yacht, the Mignonette, who in 1884 were shipwrecked in a storm some 1,600 miles from the Cape of Good Hope. After a few weeks adrift in a lifeboat, 17-year-old Richard Parker fell unconscious due to a combination of hunger and drinking seawater. Two of the three others on the boat decided to kill and eat him (the third man abstained). They were picked up four days later. The case held that necessity was not a defense for a charge of murder, and the two defendants were convicted, though their death sentence was commuted to six months' imprisonment.

In this case, the rules of the traditional custom had not been adhered to since no lots had been drawn. However, the judges made it clear that they did not consider necessity a possible justification for murder regardless of the circumstances; they did not consider killing anyone acceptable, even if this was the sole way to ensure the survival of the others, instead declaring that the right course of action, under the circumstances, would have been for everybody to starve to death.

After this judgment, there were no more cases of openly admitted cannibal killings on board British or American ships. This does not necessarily mean that they no longer occurred — but the sailors had undoubtedly learned that more discretion was now required since the custom had effectively been declared unlawful in the Mignonette case. In the 1890s, there were two more highly suspect cases of maritime hunger cannibalism, but the survivors asserted that the eaten had died a natural death. Nobody seemed strongly inclined to try to prove otherwise, and no juridical proceedings followed.

In other countries, the defense of necessity to prevent starvation in the case of shipwrecks proved somewhat more durable. In the 1890s, two such incidents occurred on Norwegian vessels. In one case, sailors drew lots to select a victim, while in the other case, two sailors were stabbed to death and eaten because the other sailors considered them close to death anyway. In both cases, the authorities investigated but decided not to press charges, considering the acts as justified by necessity.

== Historical examples of lot drawing before survival cannibalism ==
=== Saint Christopher case ===
Sometime between 1629 and 1640, seven Englishmen in the Caribbean embarked on an overnight voyage from Saint Christopher Island but were blown out to sea and lost for 17 days. During this time, starving, they cast lots to see who would sacrifice his life for the others. The lot fell to the man who had suggested the scheme, and he consented to his subsequent killing. His body sustained the rest until they made their way to Saint Martin. They were returned to Saint Christopher, where they were put on trial for homicide. The local English judge supposedly pardoned them, declaring that the crime was "'washed away' by 'inevitable necessity'".

The case cannot be found in the island's legal records, which start only in 1644 but was described, supposedly based on eyewitness accounts, by the Dutch surgeon Nicolaes Tulp in his Observationes Medicae (1641). Simpson considers his account credible, noting that he likely received information from the Dutch authorities in Saint Martin, who had decided to send the sailors back to Saint Christopher for trial.

=== Essex ===
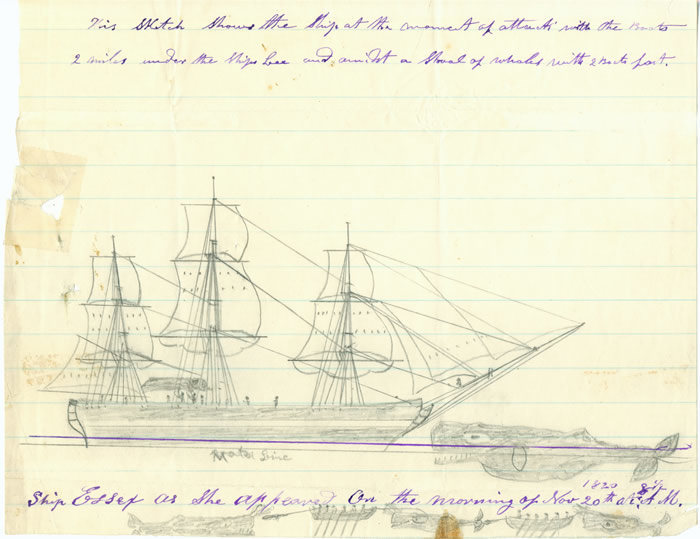
A whale striking the Essex on 20 November 1820, depicted in a sketch by Thomas Nickerson

After a whale rammed and sank the whaling ship Essex of Nantucket on 20 November 1820, the survivors were left floating in three small whaleboats. They eventually resorted, by common consent, to cannibalism to allow some to survive. Of the seven crew members eaten, reportedly six died of starvation and exposure; one, Owen Coffin, lost a lottery, and was shot. The captain volunteered to take Coffin's place, but Coffin refused, accepting his lot stoically.

The first four men who died and were eaten were all African Americans. Historian Nathaniel Philbrick as well as Vincent Woodard, the author of The Delectable Negro, doubt that this was purely incidental. They suggest that the white crew members may have deliberately killed them for food or else that they refused to share any remaining provisions as well as the "meat" of those who had already starved and been butchered, thus causing the Black men to starve first.

=== Doubtful cases ===
In the case of the Mary, which sank in 1736, and the Euxine, which shipwrecked in 1874, lots were ostensibly drawn to determine a victim for killing and cannibalism. However, in both cases there are doubts whether the lot drawing was fair (and whether it even happened), since the lot fell, conveniently from the viewpoint of the core crew, on an "obvious victim". In the case of the Mary, a passenger was singled out; in the case of the Euxine, the deadly lot fell on an Italian "boy" of about 20 years, who was both a foreigner (speaking little English) and the youngest surviving crew member.

== Cases where no fair lottery was held ==
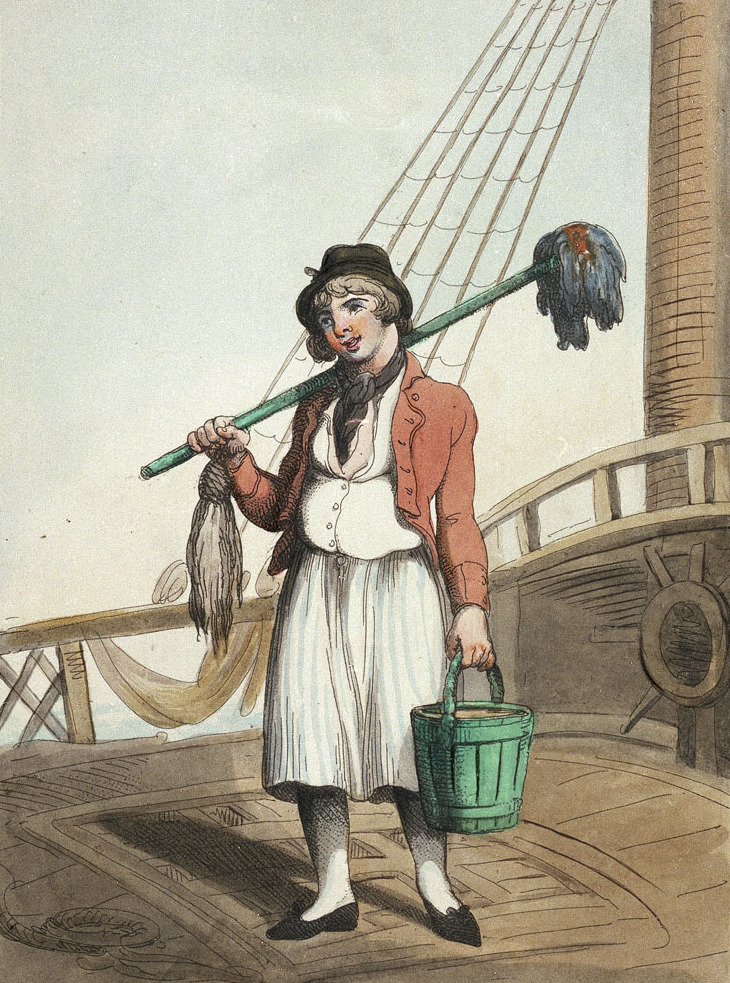
1799 illustration of a cabin boy. On Francis Spaight, the ship's four cabin boys were submitted to a lottery, which resulted in one of them being killed and eaten by the rest of the crew.

In other cases, it is known that somebody was killed for survival cannibalism without a fair lottery taking place. In such cases, the victim was almost always a person of low status, such as an enslaved Black person or a teenage boy.

=== With Black slaves or cabin boys as victims ===
In the winter of 1765/66, the American ship Peggy drifted for months after a severe storm had destroyed all its means of navigation. Having eaten all their provisions and any remaining "tobacco, lamp oil, candles, and ... leather", the crew told the captain they would hold a lottery to decide who should be slaughtered to feed the others. But among themselves, they had already decided to kill the one Black slave on board, and after a sham lottery, they "shot him through the head. One of the crew ate the victim's raw liver; some of the rest of the body was cooked, and the remainder was pickled."

At nearly the same time, in 1766, a vessel named Tiger was shipwrecked. After provisions had run out, the sailors decided to kill the one "negro youth" on board (likely an enslaved person) rather than drawing lots, as one of them freely reported afterwards. The dead body was then smoked to last longer.

The Irish sailing barque Francis Spaight capsized and almost sank in December 1836 near the coast of Canada. All provisions were lost or spoiled. Four of the fifteen survivors were teenage apprentices. Two weeks after the accident, the captain decided that "lots should be drawn between the four boys, as they had no families, and could not be considered so great a loss to their friends, as those who had wives and children depending upon them." The boys protested against this unfair decision, but in vain. The lot fell on fourteen-year-old Patrick O'Brien, whom the ship's cook then killed. During the next few days, the sailors survived by drinking his blood and eating his flesh.

In the late nineteenth century, a British resident magistrate met a captain named Anson whose crew "had run short of provisions" while "bring[ing] a yacht from England to Australia". Accordingly, they had killed and "eaten the cabin boy". No lot drawing is mentioned, but they had somehow escaped legal consequences, "probably upon some plea of self-preservation".

=== In the Atlantic slave trade ===
In 1837, a British cruiser captured the Portuguese schooner Arrogante, which had tried to bring several hundred West African slaves to Cuba, circumventing the British blockade. More than 60 Africans had died of hunger and diseases during the crossing, and the rest were severely undernourished. Many of the survivors reported "that one of the Africans on board the Arrogante had been murdered, and that, subsequently, the sailors had cooked pieces of his body and served them with rice to the rest of the Africans." Half a dozen witnesses had seen "how the Portuguese sailors took Mina behind a sail that they had put up across the deck to stop the rest of the Africans from witnessing what was about to happen." One "who had peeped through the holes in the sail ... described how they cut Mina's throat 'with a long knife'". Several enslaved girls saw how "the flesh of Mina had been cut into small pieces and ... cooked in the big pot destined for the Africans." One of them added "that the sailors had also cooked the liver and heart of Mina in their own smaller pot, and then had eaten those parts themselves", and another witness confirmed this observation.

The British colonial authorities in Jamaica decided not to press charges against any of the Portuguese sailors, mostly based on the argument that they considered the ship's captain – who was known to have directed at least six slave voyages – too "inoffensive" to be capable "of such a horrible transaction". Historian Manuel Barcia observed that this was not the only case where accusations of "White cannibalism" by Black victims of the Atlantic slave trade were dismissed, and speculated that, "sheltered by distance, isolation, and lawlessness while at sea, other similar instances may have indeed taken place between the sixteenth and the nineteenth centuries".

=== In the 20th century ===
In May 1988, a motorized junk with 110 Vietnamese refugees on board, headed for Malaysia, suffered engine damage and drifted helplessly in the South China Sea. After 28 days on a vessel that had loaded provisions for only five days, the survivors started to eat the bodies of those who had died. Two passengers, a man around 30 and a 12-year-old boy, were murdered to be eaten, and two others may have been killed for the same reason. Some days later the ship was finally rescued and brought to the Philippines. Fewer than half of the persons on board had survived. Since the murders had been committed in international waters, none of the survivors had to face legal consequences despite two confessions.

== References in literature and art ==
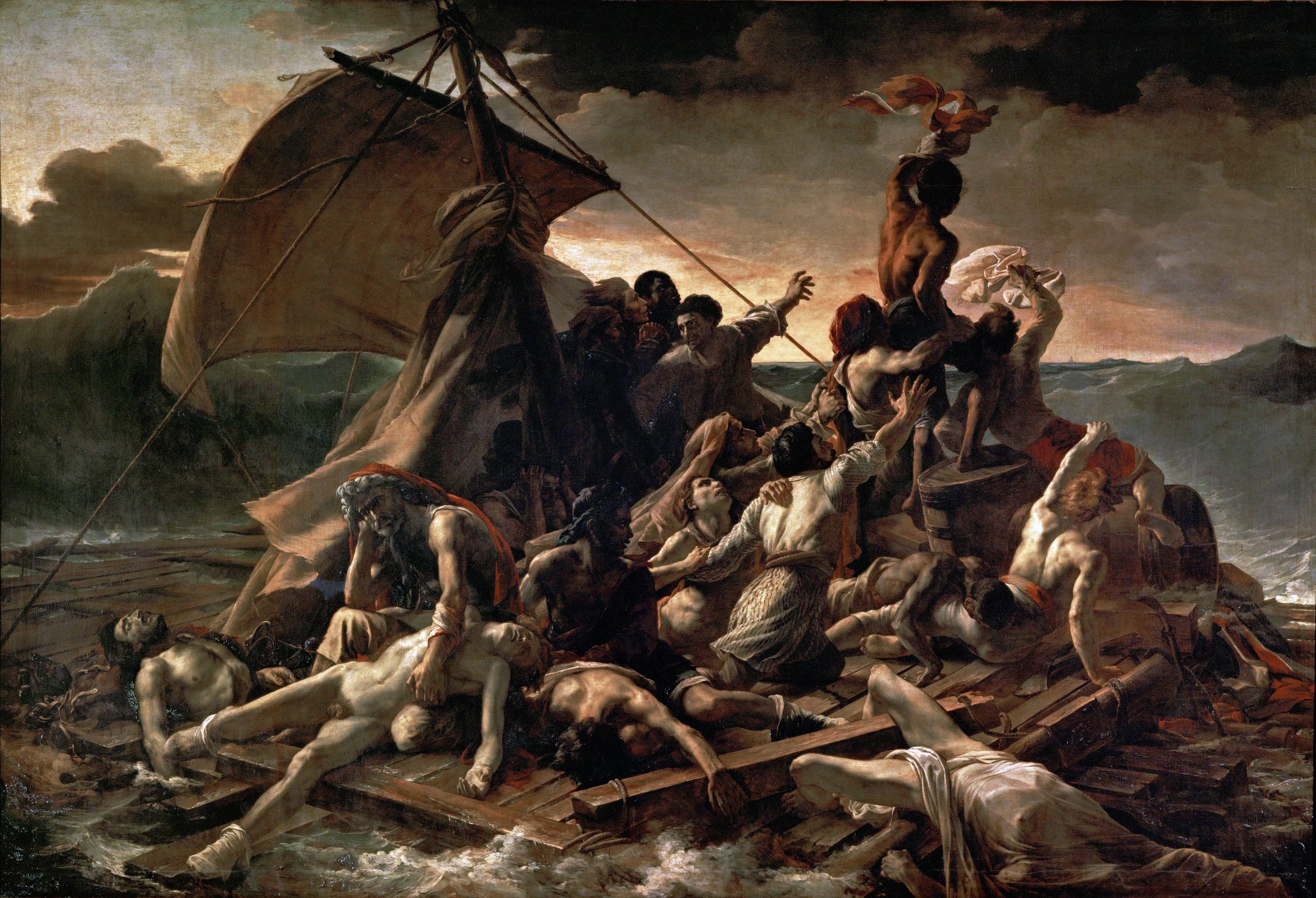
Théodore Géricault: The Raft of the Medusa

The wreck of the French frigate Méduse, leading to great suffering and cannibalism among the survivors left floating on a raft, became famous through Théodore Géricault's painting The Raft of the Medusa (1818/1819). It may have inspired Jules Verne, who in his lesser-known sailing novel The Survivors of the Chancellor (1875) features cannibalism on the raft of a sunken ship.

Edgar Allan Poe's only novel, The Narrative of Arthur Gordon Pym of Nantucket (1838), has a minor character, Richard Parker, whom the shipwreck's survivors cannibalise. In an eerie parallel to the actual case of the Mignonette, which happened 46 years later, both cannibalised people shared the exact same name.

In 1866, W.S. Gilbert wrote a song, "The Yarn of the Nancy Bell", in which the last survivor of shipwreck sings that he is the entire crew after drawing lots and eating his other shipmates.

The stories of Richard Parker (real and fictional) inspired the name of the tiger in Yann Martel's 2001 novel Life of Pi, in which cannibalism is discussed concerning a shipwreck.

The 2019 movie Harpoon, in which three friends are stranded aboard their yacht at sea, references both the incident aboard the Mignonette and the Edgar Allan Poe story. One of the characters is also named Richard Parker.

== See also ==
- Barratry (admiralty law)
- Mutiny
- Sailors' superstitions

== Bibliography and further reading ==
- Hanson, Neil (1999). The Custom of the Sea: The Story That Changed British Law. Doubleday. ISBN 978-0-385-60115-3.
- Simpson, A. W. B. (1984). Cannibalism and the Common Law: The Story of the Tragic Last Voyage of the Mignonette and the Strange Legal Proceedings to Which It Gave Rise. Chicago: University of Chicago Press. ISBN 978-0-226-75942-5.
- Learmonth, Eleanor; Tabakoff, Jenny (2014). No Mercy: True Stories of Disaster, Survival and Brutality. Text Publishing Company. ISBN 978-1922147240.
