= French corvette Sphinx =

French corvette

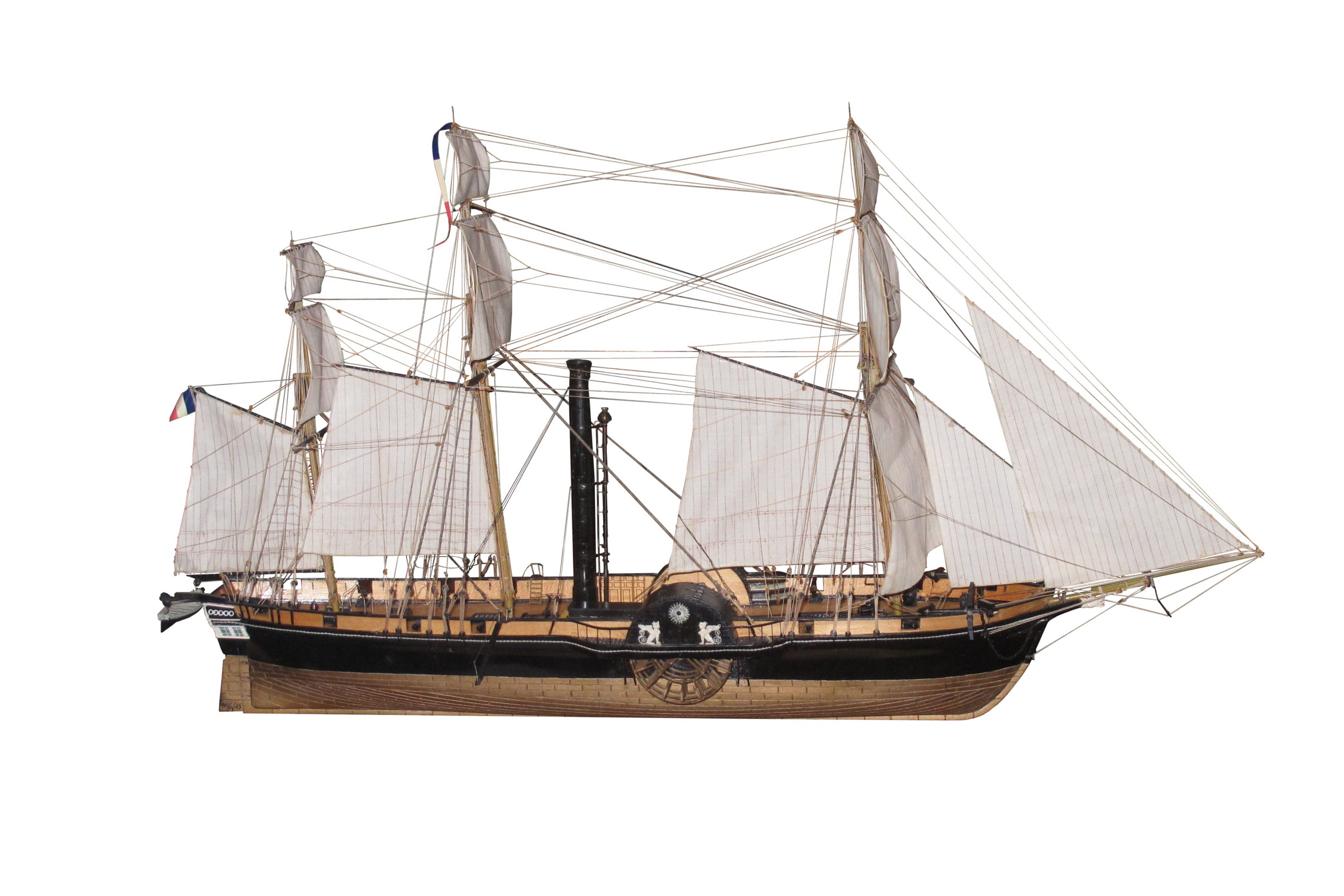
- 1/100th Model of the French paddle steamer corvette Sphinx. Made by the model workshop of the Musée de la Marine in 1962, on display at Toulon naval museum.

History

France
- Name: Sphinx
- Namesake: Sphinx
- Builder: Rochefort, plans by Hubert
- Laid down: June 1828
- Launched: 3 August 1829
- Fate: Wrecked 6 July 1845
- Notes: First naval steamer of France

General characteristics
- Class & type: Sphinx class aviso
- Displacement: 913 tonnes
- Length: 48.20 metres (158.1 ft)
- Beam: Hull: 8.16 metres (26.8 ft) Including paddles: 14 metres (46 ft)
- Draught: 3.00 metres (9.84 ft)
- Propulsion: Sail plan; 640 HP Newcomen steam engine
- Speed: 7 knots
- Armament: 6 × 24-pounder carronades + 2 to 4 × 160 mm howitzers

Sphinx was a paddle steamer, initially rated as a corvette, of the French Navy, and lead ship of her class. She was the first operational French naval steamer. She took part in the Invasion of Algiers in 1830, pioneering the role of steamers in navies of the mid-19th century, and later took part in the transfer of the Luxor Obelisk from Egypt to Paris.

== Career ==
Sphinx was built in Rochefort on plans by Jean-Baptiste Hubert around a low-pressure Newcomen steam engine purchased from Fawcett, in Liverpool. Indret then used this engine as its template for the locally produced engines that powered the subsequent Sphinx-class avisos.

On 25 May 1830, Sphinx sailed with a French squadron under Admiral Guy-Victor Duperré for the Invasion of Algiers. On 13 June, along with Nageur, she silenced the coastal defences of Sidi Fredj. She then carried the news of the fall of Algiers back to France.

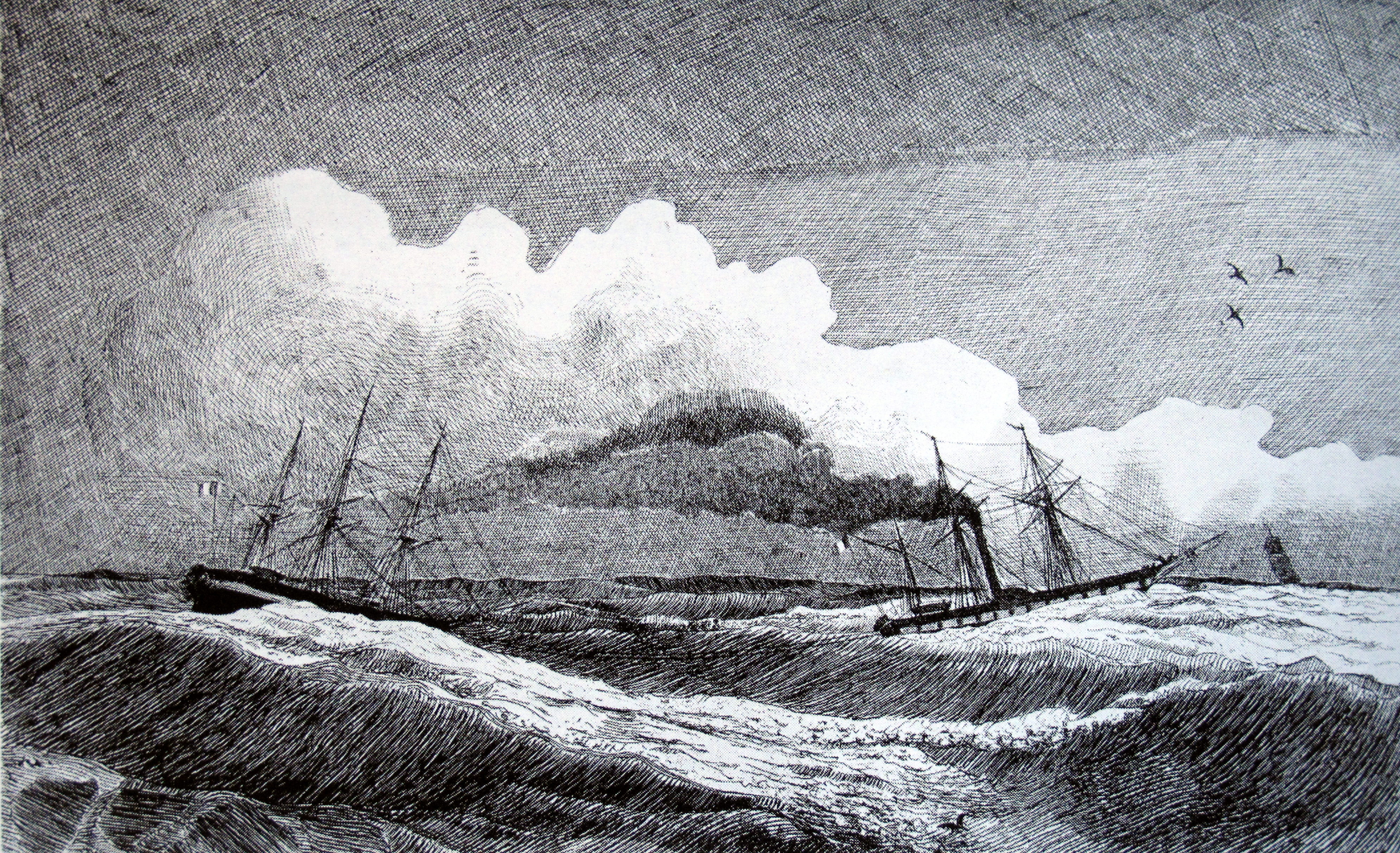
Sphinx towing the barge Louqsor ferrying the Louqsor Obelisk to France

In August 1832, under Lieutenant Sarlat, Sphinx sailed to Alexandria to rendezvous there with the barge Louqsor, which was to load the Luxor Obelisk and bring it to Paris. After the complex loading of the obelisk, the ships departed on 1 April 1833. Spinx steamed at 4.5 knots with Louqsor in tow and reached Toulon on 10 May, where she had to spend 20 days in quarantine due to the fear of cholera. The ships arrived at Cherbourg on 12 August 1833.

From 1835, Sphinx cruised off Toulon and Algiers, under Lieutenant Baudin.

In 1841, she was in the Mediterranean under Lieutenant Lacheurié, and in 1843 under Lieutenant Guichon de Grandpont.

On 6 July 1845, while under the command of Lieutenant Muterse, Sphinx departed Dellys, bound for Algiers. Due to a navigation error, during a heavy fog she ran aground near Cape Matifu. The steamers Caméléon, Chimère, and Tartare attempted unsuccessfully to aid her. Sphinx became a total loss, though her entire crew was saved.

== Legacy ==
The wreck of Sphinx was discovered on 25 June 2005 by Max Guérout, of the Groupe de Recherche et d'Archéologie Navale, in four metres of water.

Because she was the French Navy's first steamer, Sphinx has attracted some attention. Models of the ship are on display at the Musée national de la Marine in Paris as well as at the annex of the Museum in Toulon. A model of her engine can be seen at the Musée des Arts et Métiers in Paris.
