= Sphinx-class aviso =

First type of steamer corvettes in service in the French Navy

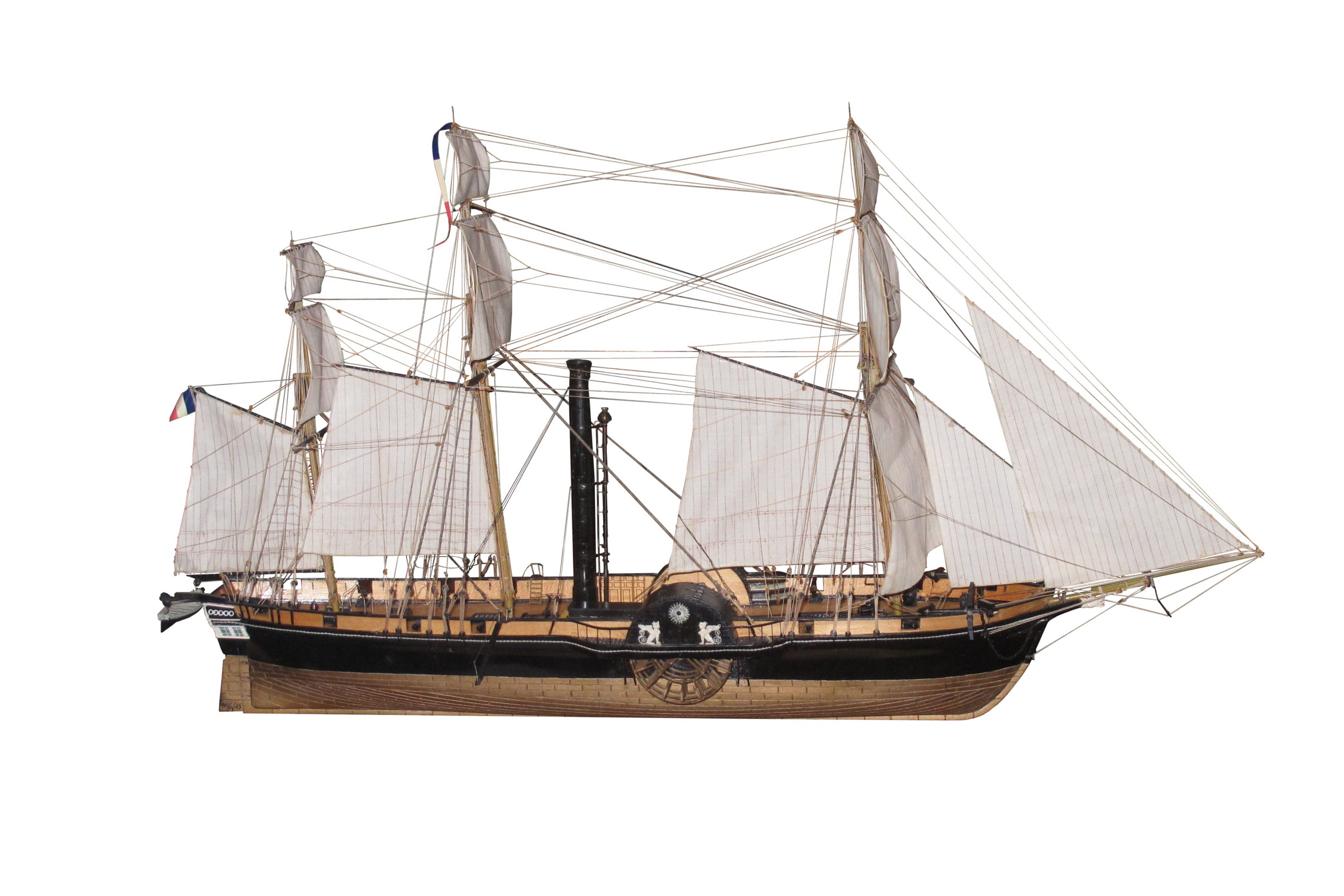
- 1/100th model of the French paddle steamer corvette Sphinx. Made by the model workshop of the Musée de la Marine in 1962, on display at Toulon naval museum.

Class overview
- Name: Sphinx
- Builders: Rochefort
- Operators: French Navy
- Completed: 6

General characteristics
- Type: Aviso
- Displacement: 913 tonnes
- Length: 48.20 m (158 ft 2 in)
- Beam: Hull: 8.16 m (26 ft 9 in) Including paddles: 14 m (45 ft 11 in)
- Draught: 3.00 m (9 ft 10 in)
- Propulsion: Sail plan; 640 hp (480 kW) Newcomen steam engine
- Speed: 7 knots (13 km/h; 8.1 mph)
- Armament: 6 to 11 guns; 6 24-pounder carronades; 2 to 4 160 mm (6.3 in) howitzers
- Armour: Timber

The Sphinx class was the first type of steamer corvettes in service in the French Navy. They were motorised by French-made steam engines cloned from a low-pressure Newcomen steam engine purchased from Fawcett, in Liverpool, and made at Indret. Initially classified as "paddle corvettes", they were later reclassified as "first-class avisos".

== Ships in class ==
- Sphinx

Builder: Rochefort
Ordered:
Laid down:
Launched:
Completed:
Fate: Wrecked

- Ténaré

Builder:
Ordered:
Laid down:
Launched:
Completed:
Fate:

- Euphrate

Builder:
Ordered:
Laid down:
Launched:
Completed:
Fate:

== Sources and references ==
- Roche, Jean-Michel (2005). Dictionnaire des bâtiments de la flotte de guerre française de Colbert à nos jours, 1671 - 1870. Group Retozel-Maury Millau. p. 422. ISBN 978-2-9525917-0-6. OCLC 165892922.
