= Le Radeau de la Méduse (film) =

1994 film by Iradj Azimi

Le Radeau de la Méduse (English: The Raft of the Medusa) is a French film by Iranian film director Iradj Azimi. It is based on the 1816 wreck of the French frigate Méduse, and the 1819 painting Le Radeau de la Méduse by Jean-Louis André Théodore Géricault which depicts the event. Filming began in 1987, but was interrupted by Hurricane Hugo in September 1989, which delayed completion of the film until the following year. Distribution of film then languished for several years, until Azimi cut his wrist in front of officials of the French Ministry of Culture.

== Plot ==
1816. After the Battle of Waterloo, Louis XVIII is restored to the French throne. The frigate Méduse sets sail from Rochefort for Senegal, captained by Louis XVIII loyalist Captain Chaumareys and with the future governor of Senegal and his wife, Julien and Reine Schmaltz on board. In no time, the atmosphere of the voyage is thick with hatred and mistrust. The tension mounts between the autocratic, incompetent Captain Chaumareys and Coudein, his lieutenant, until one fine day in June, despite Coudein's warnings, the Méduse is inexplicably wrecked.

== Cast ==
- Jean Yanne (Duroy de Chaumareys)
- Daniel Mesguich (Lt. Jean-Daniel Coudein)
- Alain Macé (Henri Savigny)
- Claude Jade (Reine-Renée Schmaltz)
- Philippe Laudenbach (Julien-Désiré Schmaltz)
- Michel Baumann (Alexandre Corréard)
- Victor Garrivier (Antoine Richefort)
- Laurent Terzieff (Théodore Géricault)
- Jean Desailly (La Tullaye)
- Rufus (Soldier Musician)
- Jean-François Balmer (Napoleon)

== See also ==
- French frigate Méduse (1810)
- The Raft of the Medusa
