= Hugues Duroy de Chaumareys =

French naval officer

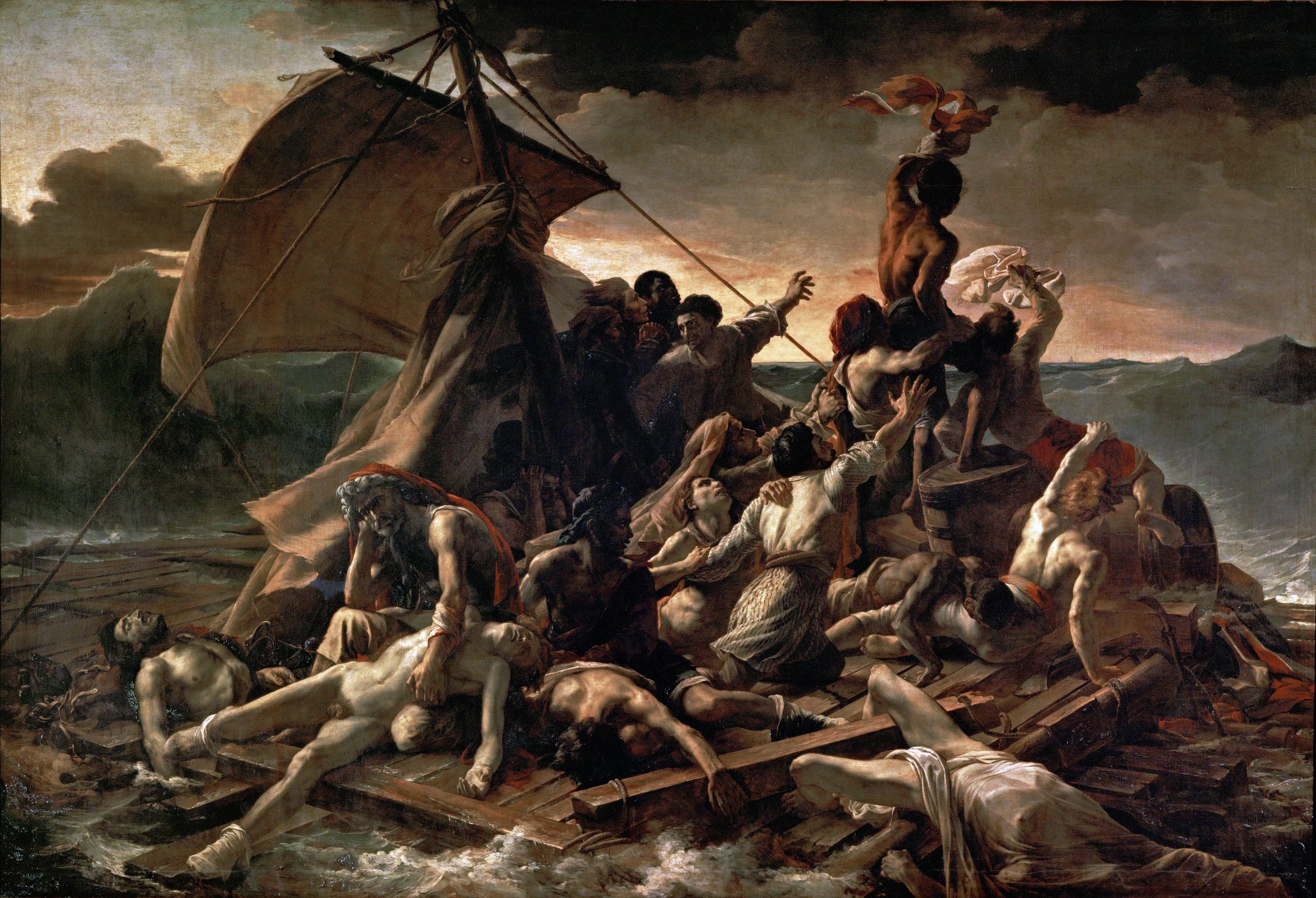
The Raft of the Medusa by Théodore Géricault

Hugues Duroy de Chaumareys, (French pronunciation: [yɡ dyʁwa də ʃomaʁɛ]; December 20, 1763, in Vars-sur-Roseix – November 23, 1841, at Bussière-Boffy) was a French naval officer, the "incompetent and complacent" captain of the frigate La Méduse when it ran aground off the coast of Mauritania on 2 July 1816 and circa 151 people died. On 5 July 1816, at least 147 people were set adrift on a hurriedly constructed raft; all but 15 died in the 13 days before their rescue, and the survivors endured starvation, dehydration, and cannibalism at sea. The event was an international scandal, in part because of his incompetence, having been appointed by the newly restored Bourbon King Louis XVIII by virtue of his nobility and royalist actions, even though he had hardly sailed in 20 years.

In February 1817 he escaped the death penalty but was sentenced to three years imprisonment by his court-martial at Port de Rochefort. He was found guilty of incompetent and complacent navigation and of abandoning Méduse before all her passengers had been taken off.

In 1818–19 the French Romantic painter Théodore Géricault created the iconic Scène de Naufrage (Shipwreck Scene) which hangs in the Louvre as The Raft of the Medusa.

== Early life and education ==
Hugues Duroy de Chaumareys was born into an old bourgeois family in Vars-sur-Roseix in the province of Limousin (now Corrèze). His maternal grandfather, Admiral Louis Guillouet, comte d'Orvilliers, had been ennobled by Louis XIV. He completed his education under the Admiral and started a naval career. During his last assignment before the French Revolution, he was the captain of a transport ship.

== French revolution ==
In 1790 he fled to England, an émigré from the French Revolution. In 1795 he was involved in a failed royalist invasion attempt at Quiberon by the Hector Regiment (Régiment Hector ou Marine Royale). He was imprisoned in Vannes and had to lie to avoid execution. The Breton Sophie de Kerdu aided his escape to England, where he was treated like a hero, published a widespread account of his exploits, and received the Ordre Royal et Militaire de Saint-Louis on February 21, 1796.

== Bourbon restoration - Méduse scandal ==
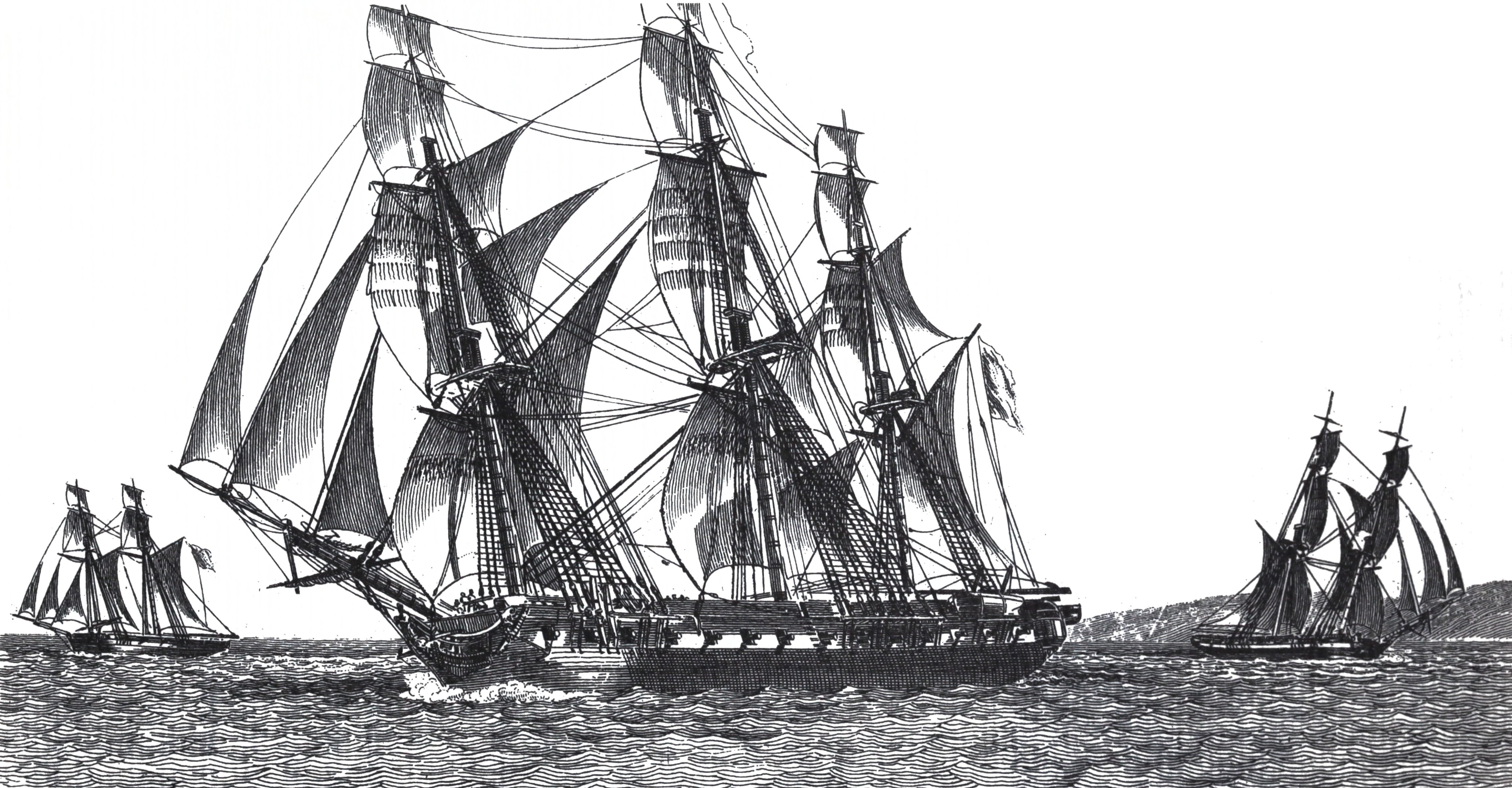
French frigate Méduse

After the Bourbon Restoration, de Chaumareys, like many other royalists, was thanked by the new King Louis XVIII. In 1816 he was commissioned to lead a ship formation from Rochefort to Saint-Louis, Senegal. On board the lead frigate Méduse, was the future governor of Senegal, Julien-Désiré Schmaltz, and his family, travelling to formally resume possession of the former French colony from the British garrison. The flotilla included the supply ship Loire, the brig Argus and the corvette Écho.

The incompetence of de Chaumareys and impatience of governor Schmaltz were to prove a tragic combination. Schmaltz wanted to reach Saint-Louis as fast as possible, by the most direct route, though this would take the fleet dangerously close to the shore, where there were many sandbars and reefs. Experienced crews sailed further out. Méduse was the fastest of the convoy and, disregarding his orders, Captain Chaumareys quickly lost contact with Loire and Argus. Écho kept pace and attempted to guide Méduse, but to no avail. Écho then prudently moved further out to sea.

Chaumareys had decided to involve one of the passengers, Richefort, in the navigation of the frigate. Richefort was a philosopher and a member of the Philanthropic Society of Cape Verde, but had no qualification to guide ships. As she closed on the coast of Africa, the course of Méduse became dangerous. Richefort apparently mistook a large cloud bank on the horizon for Cape Blanco on the African coast, and so underestimated the proximity of the Bank of Arguin off the coast of Mauritania.

On 2 July 1816, now more than 100 miles (161 km) off course, Méduse ran into increasingly shallow water, with both Chaumareys and Richefort ignoring signs such as white breakers and mud in the water. Eventually, Lieutenant Maudet took it upon himself to start taking soundings off the bow, and, measuring only 18 fathoms (33 m), warned his captain. Realising the danger at last, Chaumareys ordered the ship brought up into the wind, but it was too late, and Méduse ran aground 50 kilometres (31 mi) from the coast. The accident occurred at a spring high tide, which made it difficult to re-float the frigate. The captain refused to jettison the 14 three-tonne cannons and so the ship settled into the bank.

There were insufficient life-boats so a raft was built for about a third of the passengers and crew members, to be towed by the lifeboats towards the African coast. But, the connecting ropes were cut so the raft, unable to manoeuvre and inadequately stocked with food and water, drifted helplessly at sea for 13 days until it was rescued by the Argus. Only 15 of the 146 people survived, and 5 died on-shore. 17 crew had remained on the stranded ship but only 3 survived. De Chaumareys was arrested on his return to France and in February 1817 he escaped the death penalty but was imprisoned for three years by a court-martial at Port de Rochefort. He was found guilty of incompetent and complacent navigation and of abandoning Méduse before all her passengers had been taken off.

== Personal life ==
While an emigre from the revolution he went to Westphalia in Germany where, in 1796, he married Sophie Élisabeth von der Brüggeney, descended from a family of Teutonic knights. (Since around 1430 the family name von Brüggeney has been associated with the name Hasenkamp)

After his court-martial and imprisonment, he retired to his mother's home, the Château de Lachenaud in Bussière-Boffy, in Haute-Vienne. He accumulated so many debts that the chateau was seized after his death, and his son committed suicide.

== Literature ==
- Jonathan Miles: The wreck of the Medusa. Grove Press, New York 2007, ISBN 978-0-8021-4392-1 .
- Nicole Raynaud, "A Limousin sailor, Hugues Duroy de Chaumareys, commander of the Medusa, revealed by unpublished family archives", Bulletin of the Limousin Archaeological and Historical Society, vol. 136, 2008, pp. 137–169
- Snow, Edward Rowe (1979). Tales of terror and tragedy. New York: Dodd, Mead. ISBN 978-0396077756.
