= Vars-sur-Roseix =

- Commune
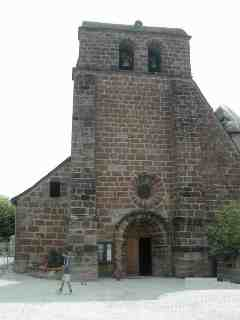
- The church in Vars-sur-Roseix

- Coat of arms
- Location of Vars-sur-Roseix
- Location within France Location within Nouvelle-Aquitaine
- Coordinates: 45°15′37″N 1°21′55″E
- Country: France
- Region: Nouvelle-Aquitaine
- Department: Corrèze
- Arrondissement: Brive-la-Gaillarde
- Canton: L'Yssandonnais
- Intercommunality: CA Bassin de Brive

Government
  - Mayor (2020–2026): Christine Corcoral
- Area^{1}: 4.26 km^{2} (1.64 sq mi)
- Elevation: 210 m (690 ft)
- Highest elevation: 235 m (771 ft)
- Lowest elevation: 109 m (358 ft)
- Population (2023): 415
  - Density: 97.4/km^{2} (252/sq mi)
- Time zone: UTC+01:00 (CET)
  - Summer (DST): UTC+02:00 (CEST)
- INSEE/Postal code: 19279 /19130
- ^{1} French Land Register data, which excludes lakes, ponds, glaciers > 1 km^{2} (0.386 sq mi or 247 acres) and river estuaries.

Vars-sur-Roseix is a commune in the Corrèze department in central France.

== Population ==
Historical population
Year	Pop.	±% p.a.
1968	211	—
1975	227	+1.05%
1982	257	+1.79%
1990	280	+1.08%
1999	254	−1.08%
2007	295	+1.89%
2012	348	+3.36%
2017	374	+1.45%
2023	415	+1.75%
Source: INSEE

== Notable people ==
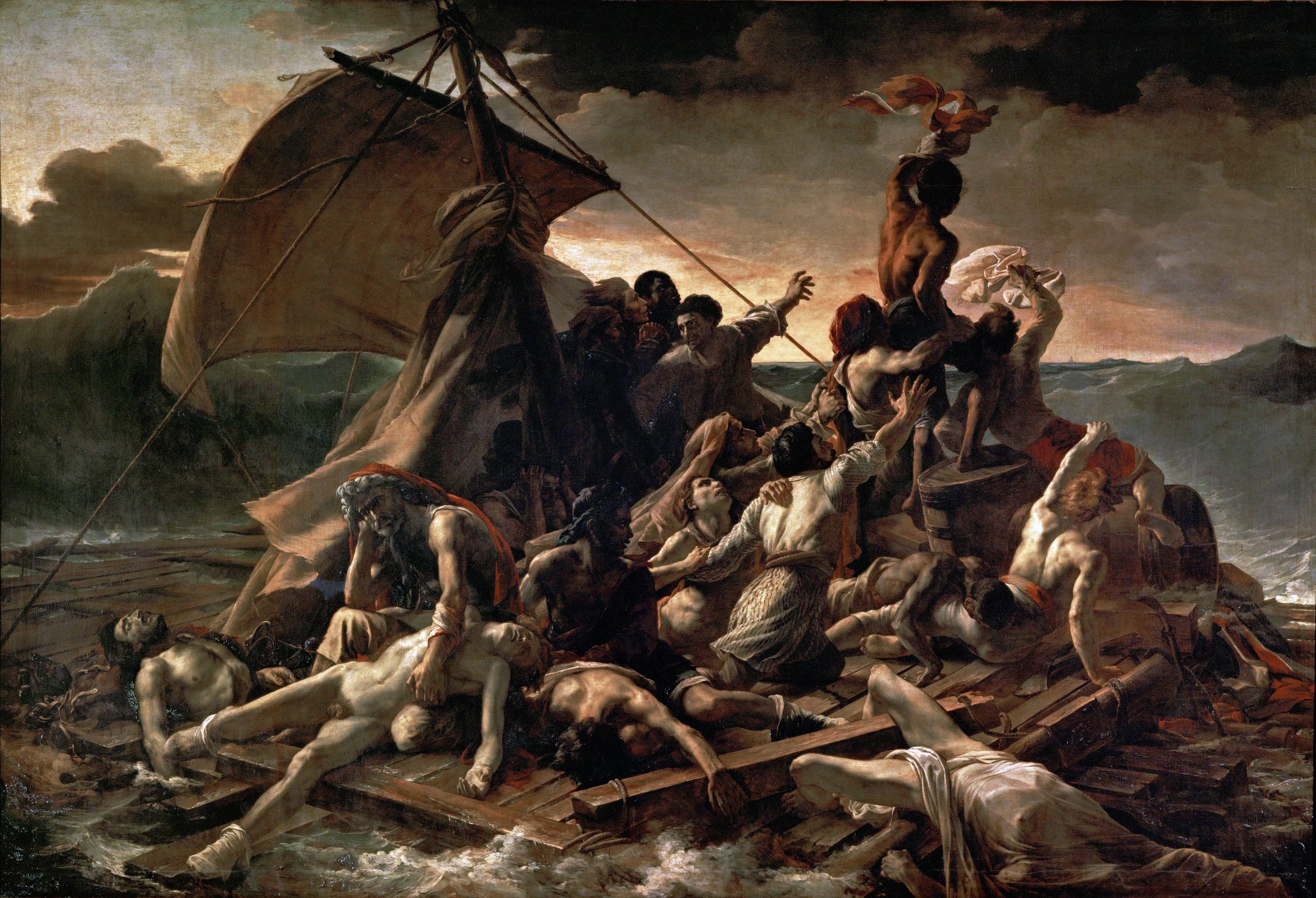
The Raft of the Medusa by Théodore Géricault

- Hugues Duroy de Chaumareys (1763-1841) Incompetent captain of the French frigate Méduse (1810) that sank with the loss of circa 150 lives.

== See also ==
- Communes of the Corrèze department
