= Prince George (1806 ship) =

British merchant ship

History

United Kingdom
- Name: Prince George
- Builder: Peter Everitt Mestaer, King and Queen Dock, Rotherhithe
- Launched: 2 August 1806
- Fate: Last listed 1854

General characteristics
- Tons burthen: 436, or 43641/94, or 437, or 450 (bm)
- Armament: 1806:2 × 4-pounder guns; 1809:6 × 6-pounder guns

Prince George was launched in 1806 at Rotherhithe. She began her 48-year career as a West Indiaman. The French captured and released her in December 1814, to carry captured British sailors back to Britain. She then again sailed as a West Indiaman. Towards the end of the 1820s she started sailing to New South Wales. In 1834 she made a voyage under charter to the Hudson's Bay Company. Thereafter she traded between London and Quebec. In 1842 she brought 262 immigrants from England to Quebec. She was last listed in 1854.

== Career ==
Prince George first appeared in Lloyd's Register (LR) in the 1806 volume with J.Bailey, master, Frier & Co., owner, changing to Rutherford & Co., and trade London–Jamaica. She appears to have replaced an earlier Prince George that Rutherford owned, and that next year appears with a new master, Pizzie, and owner, Boyman & Co., though still in the London–Jamaica trade.

Year	Master	Owner	Trade	Source & notes
1810	J.Bailey	Rutherford & Co.	London–Jamaica	LR
1815	J.Bailey	Rutherford & Co.	London–Jamaica	LR

Between 27 and 29 December 1814, the French frigates Nymphe and Méduse captured a number of British merchant ships at 16°N 39°W. (Note: The news item in Lloyd's List (LL) gave the names of the frigates as Nymphe and Modeste, but there was no Modeste in service with the French Navy at that time. There was a Méduse, and she was operating with Nymphe.) The vessels captured were Prince George, Dalley, master, Lady Caroline Barham, Boyce, master, and Potsdam, Cummings, master all three coming from London and bound to Jamaica; Flora, Ireland, master, from London to Martinique; Brazil Packet, from Madeira to the Brazils; and Rosario and Thetis, from Cape Verde. The French burnt all the vessels they captured, except Prince George. They put their prisoners into her and sent her off as a cartel to Barbados, which she reached on 10 January 1815.

Year	Master	Owner	Trade	Source & notes
1820	T.Parker	Bailey	London–Jamaica	LR; thorough repair 1820
1825	T.Parker	Rutherford	London–Jamaica	LR; thorough repair 1820
1830	M.Andrews	Andrews	London–New South Wales	LR; thorough repair 1820 & damages repaired 1826
1833	M.Andrews; D. Friend	Andrews; Gould & Co.	London–New South Wales; London–Quebec?	Register of Shipping; repair 1820, damages repaired 1826, & small repairs
1834	D.Friend	Gould & Co.	London–Hudson's Bay	LR;

In 1834 the Hudson's Bay Company chartered Prince George for a voyage from London to York Factory, and back to London. An article on navigation to Hudson Bay reports that Captain Grove sailed Prince George to York Factory. (Note: Some sources name the captain as John Costellow Grave.) He used a chronometer to record longitude, and did not take lunar distances. Prince George arrived at York Factory on 22 August. There Grove assumed command of Prince Rupert as her captain had become incapacitated. Grove took his chronometer with him, suggesting that it was his personal property and not part of Prince George's equipment. Captain Daniel Friend replaced Grave in command of Prince George.

Prince George may have made a second voyage for the HBC in 1837.

Year	Master	Owner	Trade	Source
1835	D.Friend	D.Gould & Co.	London–Hudson's Bay; London–Virginia	LR
1837	D.Friend	Gould & Co.	London–Hudson's Bay	LR; small repairs 1835
1840	D.Friend	Gould & Co.	London–Quebec	LR; small repairs 1835 & damages repaired 1838

On 6 April 1842 Captain Daniel Friend sailed from England, bound for Montreal and Quebec. He arrived on 20 May. Prince George was carrying 262 immigrants. Of these, 219 were paupers, most sailing under the auspices of the Poor Law Commission, and most from Kent. The remaining 43 immigrants were sailing at their own expense. Most of the immigrants were agricultural labourers, though a few had trades, or were servants. All were in good health when they arrived in Canada. Apparently each adult, on leaving Prince George, received a free passage to join their friends in nearby districts. They also received two days' provisions, and 20 shillings.

Year	Master	Owner	Trade	Source
1845	D.Friend	Gould & Co.	London–Quebec	LR; small repairs 1835, damages repaired 1842, & small repairs 1843
1850	Fenner	Gould & Co.	London–Quebec	LR; small repairs 1845 & 1848

Year	Master	Owner	Trade	Source
1856	J.Young	Kirk	London	LR
1860	J.Young	Kirk		LR

== Fate ==
Prince George was last listed in 1863 with data unchanged since 1860.
