= French frigate Nymphe (1810) =

History

France
- Name: Nymphe
- Namesake: Nymph
- Builder: Nantes
- Laid down: January 1807
- Launched: 15 January 1810
- In service: 1 January 1811
- Out of service: 1 September 1830
- Fate: Broken up 1873

General characteristics
- Class & type: Pallas-class frigate
- Displacement: 1,080 tonnes
- Length: 46.93 m (154 ft 0 in)
- Beam: 11.91 m (39 ft 1 in)
- Draught: 5.9 m (19 ft 4 in)
- Propulsion: 1,950 m^{2} (21,000 sq ft) of sail
- Complement: 326
- Armament: Nominally 40 guns; In practice carried either 44 or 46 guns: Battery: 28 18-pounders; Quarterdeck & forecastle: 8 × 8-pounder long guns; 8 × 36-pounder carronades or 12 × 18-pounder carronades

Nymphe was a 40-gun Pallas-class frigate of the French Navy, designed by Sané.

== Career ==
In 1811, Nymphe was assigned to a frigate division under Joseph-François Raoul, along with Méduse, tasked to support Java. On 2 September, the frigates arrived at Surabaya, tailed by the British 32-gun frigate HMS Bucephalus. On the 4th, another British ship, HMS Barracouta, joined the chase, but lost contact on the 8th. On the 12th, Méduse and Nymphe chased Bucephalus, which escaped and broke contact the next day. The squadron was back in Brest on 22 December 1811.

She then served in the Atlantic Ocean.

Between 27 and 29 December 1814, the French frigates Nymphe and Méduse captured a number of British merchant ships at 16°N 39°W. (Note: The news item in Lloyd's List (LL) gave the names of the frigates as Nymphe and Modeste, but there was no Modeste in service with the French Navy at that time, but there was a Méduse, and she was operating with Nymphe.) The vessels captured were Prince George, Dalley, master, Lady Caroline Barham, Boyce, master, and Potsdam, Cummings, master, all three coming from London and bound to Jamaica; Flora, Ireland, master, from London to Martinique; Brazil Packet, from Madeira to the Brazils; and Rosario and Thetis, from Cape Verde. The French burnt all the vessels they captured, except Prince George. They put their prisoners into her and sent her off as a cartel to Barbados, which she reached on 10 January 1815.

Between 1814 and 1824, she was decommissioned at Penfeld, only undertaking a refit in 1822. On 26 March 1824, she was recommissioned with the crew of Eurydice and sent to the Caribbean station, and later Brazil. From 1832, she was used as a hulk, and was eventually broken up in 1873.
