= Mézières-sur-Issoire =

- Part of Val-d'Issoire
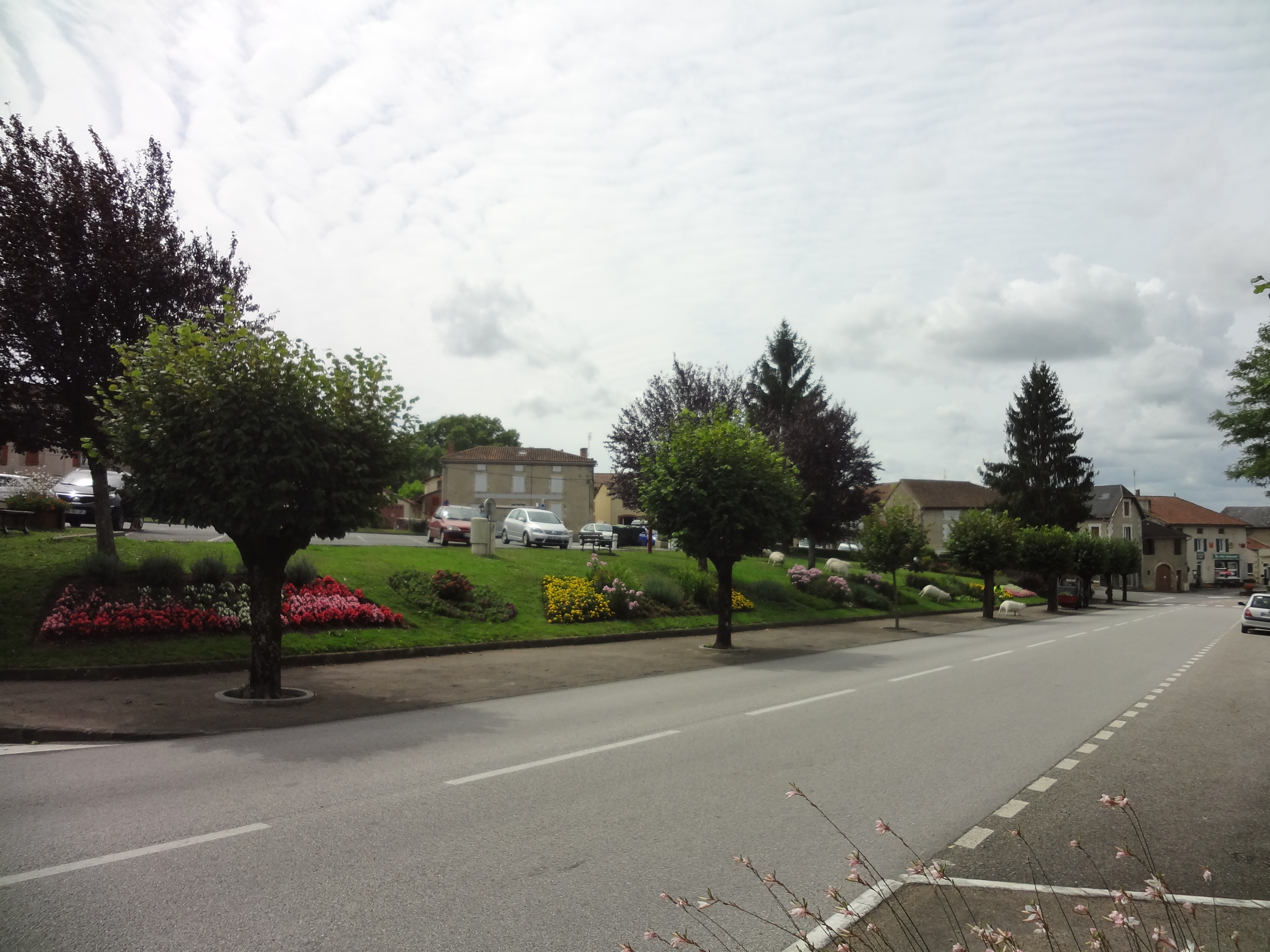
- The main square in Mézières-sur-Issoire
- Location of Mézières-sur-Issoire
- Location within France Location within Nouvelle-Aquitaine
- Coordinates: 46°06′30″N 0°54′42″E
- Country: France
- Region: Nouvelle-Aquitaine
- Department: Haute-Vienne
- Arrondissement: Bellac
- Canton: Bellac
- Commune: Val-d'Issoire
- Area^{1}: 44.16 km^{2} (17.05 sq mi)
- Highest elevation: 271 m (889 ft)
- Lowest elevation: 182 m (597 ft)
- Population (2022): 748
  - Density: 16.9/km^{2} (43.9/sq mi)
- Time zone: UTC+01:00 (CET)
  - Summer (DST): UTC+02:00 (CEST)
- Postal code: 87330
- ^{1} French Land Register data, which excludes lakes, ponds, glaciers > 1 km^{2} (0.386 sq mi or 247 acres) and river estuaries.

Mézières-sur-Issoire (French pronunciation: [mezjɛʁ syʁ iswaʁ]; Occitan: Masères) is a former commune in the Haute-Vienne department in west-central France. On 1 January 2016, it was merged into the new commune Val-d'Issoire.

Inhabitants are known as Méziérauds.

== See also ==
- Communes of the Haute-Vienne department
