= Julien-Désiré Schmaltz =

Colonel Julien-Désiré Schmaltz, or Julien Schmaltz (5 February 1771 – 26 June 1826), was a French colonial administrator and governor of Senegal from 1816 to 1820.

== Early life and career ==
Julien-Désiré Schmaltz was born in 1771 in Lorient; the son of Jean-Boniface Schmaltz and Louise Declos. He enlisted in the Dutch colonial army in 1799, serving as an officer of military engineers in Batavia. By 1814 he had reached the rank of lieutenant-colonel in the French army, based in Guadeloupe.

== Governor of Senegal ==
On 17 June 1816, Schmaltz departed for Saint-Louis, Senegal, aboard the frigate Méduse to take up his position as Governor of Senegal, which was by treaty to be returned to French rule by an occupying British force. The ship ran aground on sand banks 50 kilometres from the Senegalese shore, partly because of Schmaltz's impatience to reach Saint-Louis and partly because of the incompetence of the captain, chosen for his political loyalism rather than skills, and navigator. The tragedy that ensued, after it was decided to set 146 of the 400 crew and passengers onto a hastily built raft, was immortalized in Géricault's painting The Raft of the Medusa. Schmaltz, his family and staff made it to shore in a longboat, subsequently reaching the capital of Senegal by land. He then formally resumed possession of the former French colony from the British garrison commanded by Colonel Thomas Brereton.

Apparently escaping any direct blame for the loss of the Méduse, Schmaltz remained in office as governor for four years. On 8 May 1819 he signed the Treaty of Ndiaw with the Brak of Waalo, which resulted in the creation of a series of commercial posts along the Sénégal River (Bakel, 1820; Dagana, 1821; Merinaghen, 1822; Lampsar, 1843; Sénoudébou, 1845). This resulted in some conflict with local chieftains.

Schmaltz initiated a far-reaching project of agricultural colonization in the region of Waalo, which gradually failed after he left office and was abandoned in 1831.

== Personal life ==
Schmaltz was married to Reine Marais, also born in Lorient; daughter of Julien-Michel and Michelle-Reine Fauvel, with whom he had a daughter, Eliza Schmaltz. Eliza was born in Port Louis in Mauritius on April 3, 1798 and died 13 September 1868 in Paris. (death certificate No. 1333). She was single.

== Death ==
Recalled from Senegal in 1820, Schmaltz was subsequently appointed French Consul-General in Smyrna, Turkey. He died there on 16 June 1827.

== Movie ==
In the 1998 movie Le Radeau de la Méduse, the Schmaltz family was played by Philippe Laudenbach (Julien Schmaltz), Claude Jade (Reine Schmaltz) and Stéphanie Lanoux (Eliza Schmaltz).
