= Prince George (1789 ship) =

History

Great Britain
- Name: Prince George
- Launched: 1789
- Fate: Prince George was last listed in 1857

General characteristics
- Tons burthen: 300, or 309, or 312 (bm)

Prince George was launched in 1789 on the River Thames as a West Indiaman. She was a transport for the British 1795–1796 expedition to the Caribbean. She later traded between Scotland and Russia, and Scotland and Quebec. She was last listed in 1857, for a nominal service life of 68 years.

== Career ==
Prince George first appeared in Lloyd's Register (LR) in 1789 with John Bailey, master, Fryer & Co., owner, changing to Trecothic & Co., owner, and trade London–Jamaica.

Year	Master	Owner	Trade	Source
1790	J.Bailey	Trecothic	London–Jamaica	LR
1795	J.Bailey	Trecothic	London–Jamaica	LR

In late 1795 Admiral Hugh Cloberry Christian hoisted his flag aboard the 98-gun HMS Prince George and assembled his squadron and the transports, numbering over two hundred merchantmen carrying 16,000 men, and making up the largest troop convoy to leave England to that date. One of the merchant vessels in the fleet was Prince George, Bailey, master.

The expedition sailed on 6 October, 16 November, and 9 December, but each time weather forced the vessels to put back. The fleet finally successfully sailed on 20 March to invade St Lucia, with troops under Lieutenant-General Sir Ralph Abercromby. St Lucia surrendered to the British on 25 May. The British went on to capture Saint Vincent and Grenada.

Year	Master	Owner	Trade	Source
1800	J.Bailey	Trecothic	London–Jamaica	LR
1805	J.Bailey	Rutherford	London–Jamaica	LR; large repair 1801

In 1806 Rutherford sold Prince George to purchase a new Prince George, though the present Prince George still also appeared in the 1806 issue J.Bailey, master, Rutherford, owner, and trade London–Jamaica. The 1807 volume showed the present Prince George with a new master, Pizzie, and owner, Boyman & Co., though still in the London–Jamaica trade.

Year	Master	Owner	Trade	Source
1810	Pizzie	Boyman & Co.	London–Antigua	LR; large repair 1801
1814	Pizzie	Boyman & Co.	London–Antigua	LR; large repair 1801

Prince George disappeared from the 1814 and 1815 volumes of Lloyd's Register and from the 1815 Register of Shipping (RS). She reappeared in subsequent volumes. During this period she may have been serving as a government transport.

Year	Master	Owner	Trade	Source
1816	Duncanson	Capt. & Co.	London	RS; thorough repair 1801
1818	Duncanson	Captain & Co.	Greenock–Murmansk	LR; large repair 1801 & thorough repair 1817
1820	Duncanson	Captain & Co.	Greenock–Murmansk	LR; large repair 1801 & thorough repair 1817
1825	Duncanson	Captain & Co.	Greenock–Murmansk	LR; large repair 1801 & thorough repair 1817
1830	T.Morrison	Baird & Co.	Leith–America	LR; large repair 1801, thorough repair 1817, & large repair 1829
1835	Morrison	Duncanson	Leith–Quebec	LR; homeport Alloa
1840	M'Farlane	Duncanson	Leith–Quebec	LR; homeport Alloa
1845	M'Farlane	Duncanson	Leith–Quebec; Leith–Miramichi	LR; homeport Alloa; damages repaired 1836 & small repairs 1846
1850	J.Young	Duncanson	Leith–Quebec	LR; homeport Alloa; damages repaired 1836 & small repairs 1846
1855	J.Young	Duncanson	Leith–Quebec	LR; homeport Alloa; small repairs 1851

== Fate ==
Prince George was last listed in 1857 with information unchanged since 1855.
