= Val-d'Issoire =

- Commune
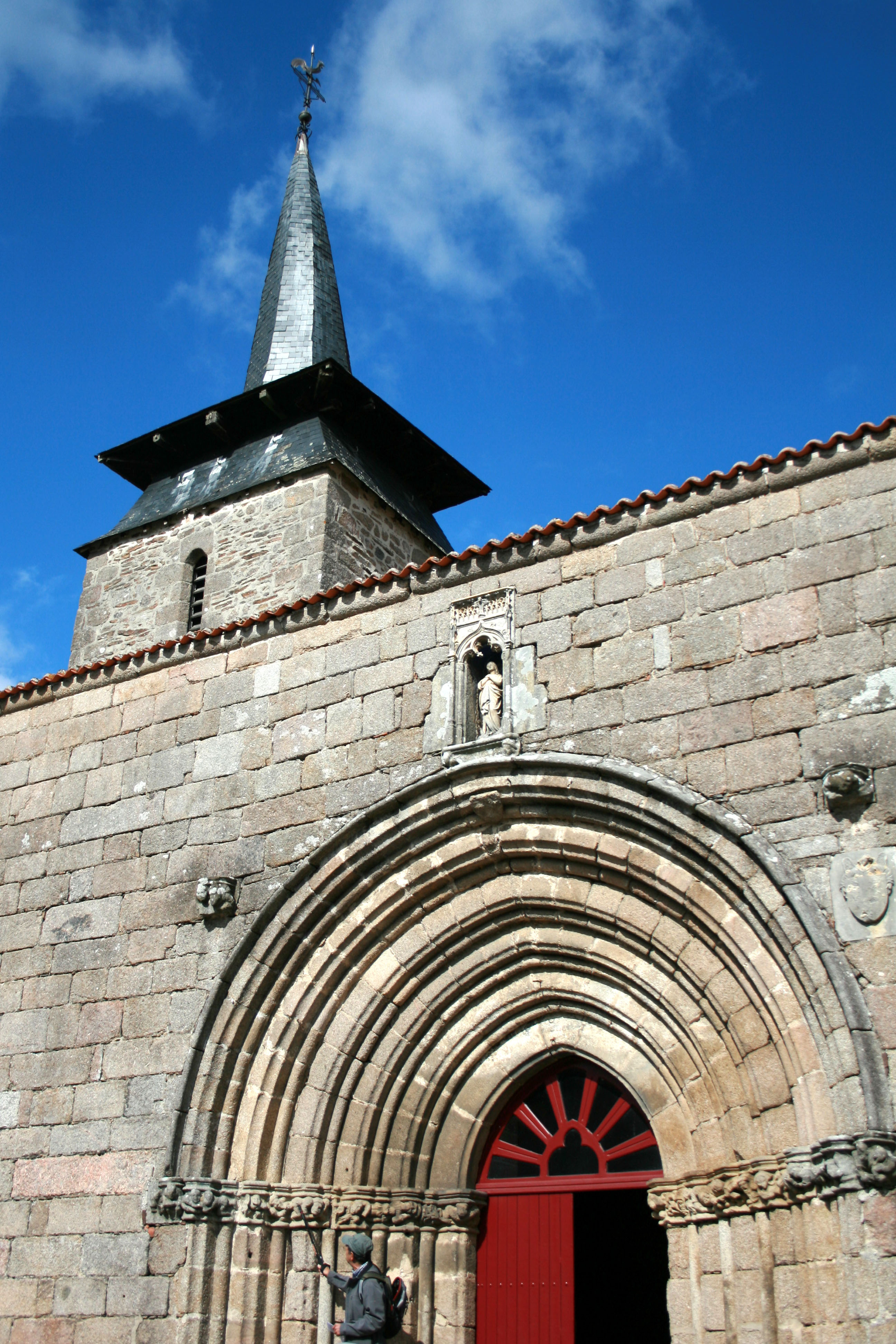
- The church of Val-d'Issoire
- Location of Val-d'Issoire
- Location within France Location within Nouvelle-Aquitaine
- Coordinates: 46°06′29″N 0°54′32″E
- Country: France
- Region: Nouvelle-Aquitaine
- Department: Haute-Vienne
- Arrondissement: Bellac
- Canton: Bellac

Government
  - Mayor (2020–2026): Pascal Godrie
- Area^{1}: 71.60 km^{2} (27.64 sq mi)
- Population (2023): 1,076
  - Density: 15.03/km^{2} (38.92/sq mi)
- Time zone: UTC+01:00 (CET)
  - Summer (DST): UTC+02:00 (CEST)
- INSEE/Postal code: 87097 /87330
- ^{1} French Land Register data, which excludes lakes, ponds, glaciers > 1 km^{2} (0.386 sq mi or 247 acres) and river estuaries.

Val-d'Issoire (French pronunciation: [val diswaʁ]; lit. 'Vale of Issoire') is a commune in the Haute-Vienne department of western France. The municipality was established on 1 January 2016 and consists of the former communes of Bussière-Boffy and Mézières-sur-Issoire.

== See also ==
- Communes of the Haute-Vienne department
