= Senoudebou =

- Town and commune
- Location within Senegal
- Coordinates: 14°21′34″N 12°14′49″W
- Country: Senegal
- Region: Tambacounda
- Department: Bakel
- Elevation: 34 m (112 ft)

Population (2003 census)
  - Town and commune: 1,864
- Time zone: UTC+0 (GMT)

Sénoudébou is a village in eastern Senegal, near the border with Mali.

== History ==
The French established a fort at Senoudebou in 1845, and reinforced it to defend against the expansion of the Toucouleur Empire. In October 1856, El Hajj Umar Tall's intelligence services tried unsuccessfully to foment a rebellion inside the fort.

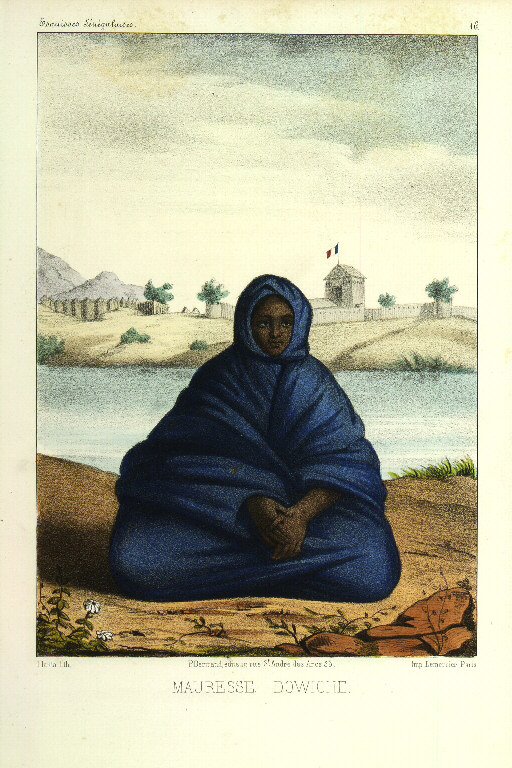
Woman on the banks of the Falémé, with the French fort of Senoudebou (water color by abbé Boilat, 1853)

In 1846, Capt. Parent pioneered archaeological digs in the region, until then little studied.

The French fort at Senoudebou was closed in 1862.

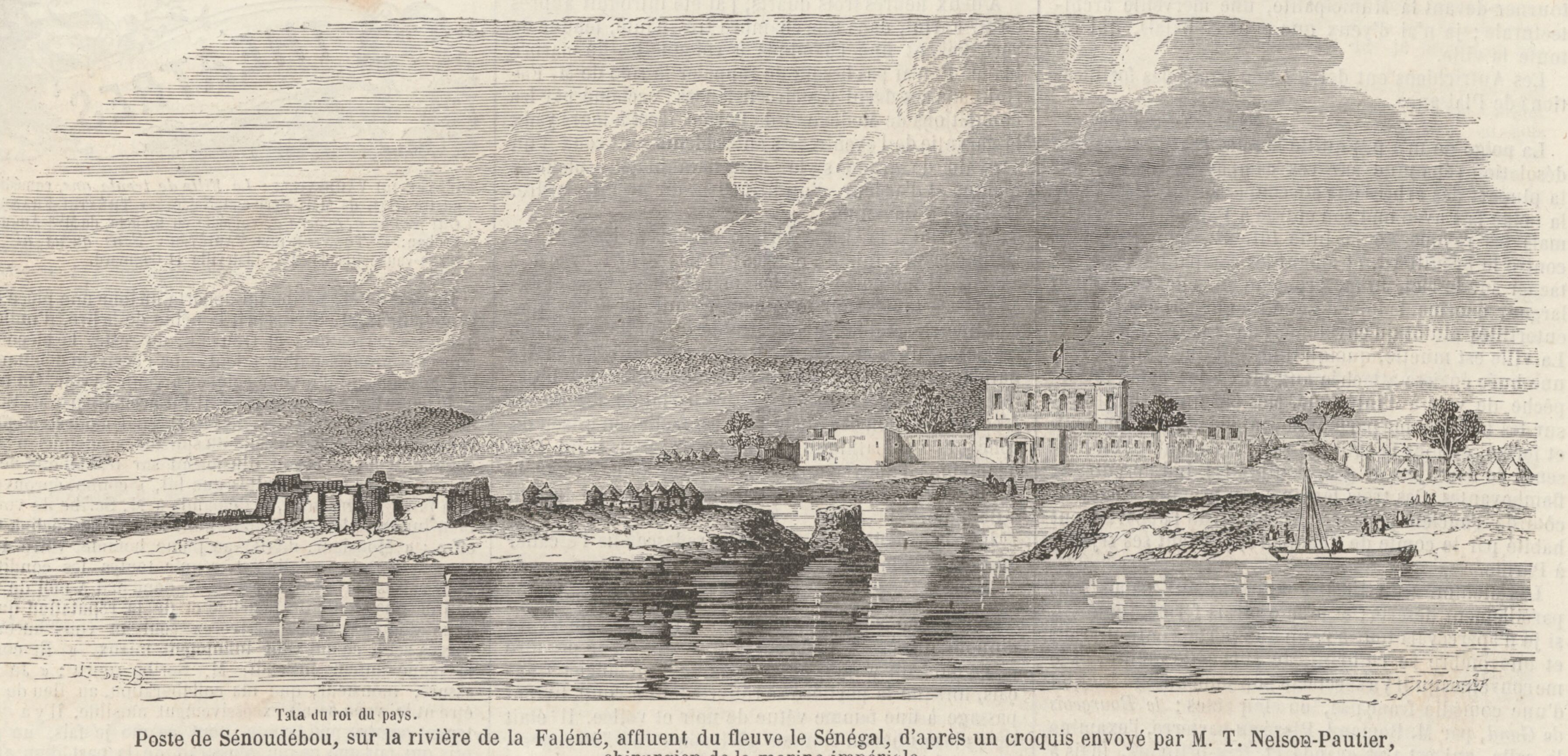
The French fort of Senoudebou and the local ruler's tata
