= French frigate Méduse (1810) =

French Navy vessel wrecked off the coast of Africa in 1816

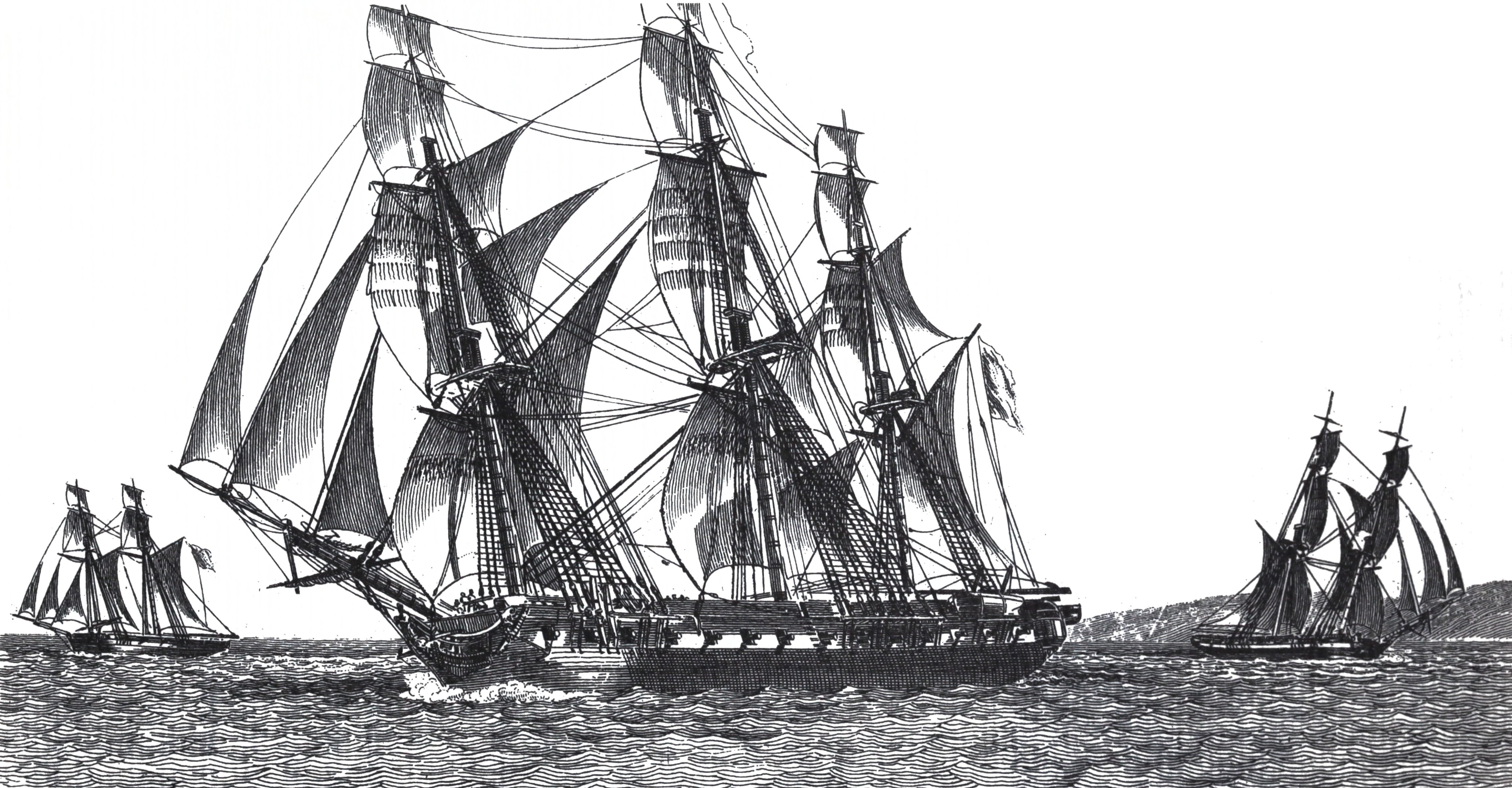
- Méduse sailing close-hauled with brigs in the background

History

France
- Name: Méduse
- Namesake: Medusa
- Builder: Crucy shipyard, Paimboeuf
- Laid down: 24 June 1806
- Launched: 1 July 1810
- In service: 26 September 1810
- Fate: Beached on Bank of Arguin

General characteristics
- Class & type: Pallas-class frigate
- Displacement: 1,080 tonnes
- Length: 46.93 m (154 ft 0 in)
- Beam: 11.91 m (39 ft 1 in)
- Draught: 5.9 m (19 ft 4 in)
- Propulsion: 1,950 m^{2} (21,000 sq ft) of sail
- Complement: 326
- Armament: Nominally 40 guns; In practice carried either 44 or 46 guns: Battery: 28 18-pounders; Quarterdeck & forecastle: 8 × 8-pounder long guns; 8 × 36-pounder carronades or 12 × 18-pounder carronades

Méduse was a 40-gun Pallas-class frigate of the French Navy, launched in 1810. She took part in the Napoleonic Wars during the late stages of the Mauritius campaign of 1809–1811 and in raids in the Caribbean.

In 1816, following the Bourbon Restoration, Méduse was armed en flûte to ferry French officials to the port of Saint-Louis, in Senegal, to formally re-establish French occupation of the colony under the terms of the First Peace of Paris. Through inept navigation by her captain, Hugues Duroy de Chaumareys, who had been given command after the Bourbon Restoration for political reasons even though he had hardly sailed in twenty years, Méduse struck the Bank of Arguin off the coast of present-day Mauritania and became a total loss.

Most of the 400 passengers on board evacuated, with 146 men and one woman forced to take refuge on an improvised raft towed by the frigate's launches. The towing proved impractical, however, and the boats soon abandoned the raft and its passengers in the open ocean. Without any means of navigating to shore, the situation aboard the raft rapidly turned disastrous. Dozens were washed into the sea by a storm, while others, drunk from wine, rebelled and were killed by officers. When supplies ran low, several of the injured were thrown into the sea, and some of the survivors resorted to cannibalism, eating the dead to escape starvation. After thirteen days at sea, the raft was discovered with only fifteen people still alive.

News of the tragedy stirred considerable public emotion, making Méduse one of the most infamous shipwrecks of the Age of Sail. Two survivors, a surgeon and an officer, wrote a widely read book about the incident, and the episode was immortalised when Théodore Géricault painted The Raft of the Medusa (1818–19), which became a notable artwork of French Romanticism.

== Service ==
Méduse was commissioned in Nantes on 26 September 1807.

=== Napoleonic Wars ===
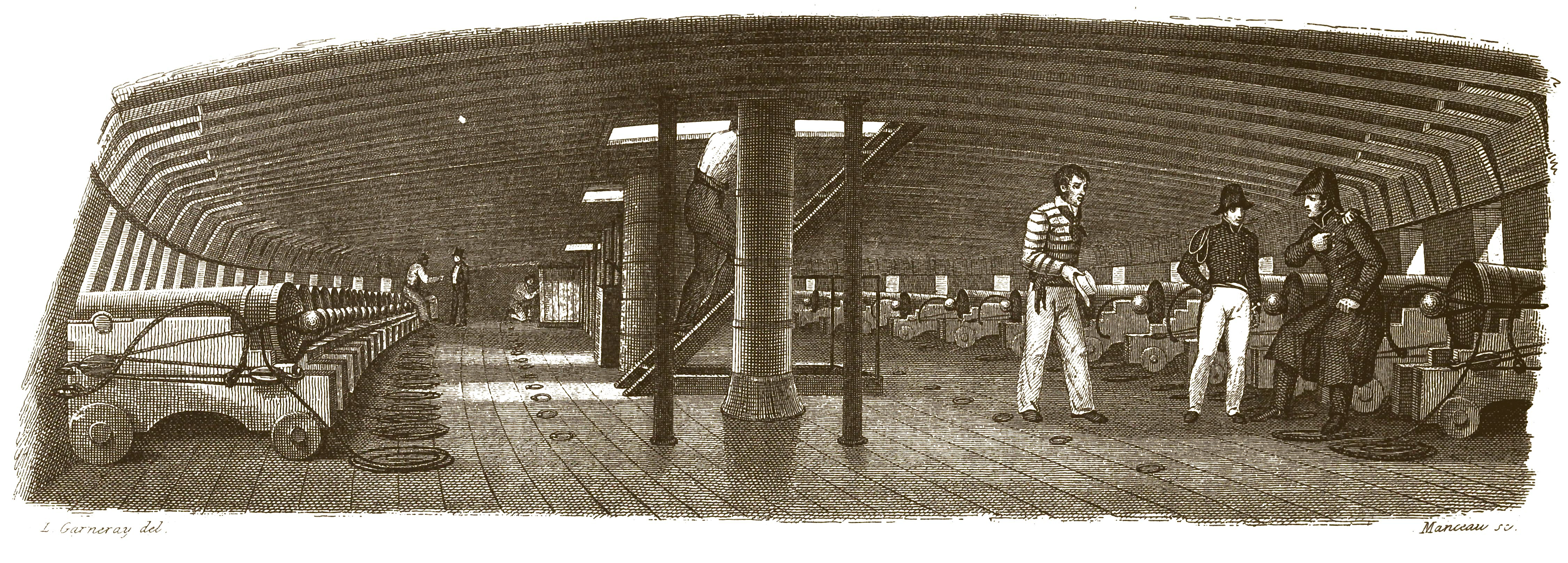
Gun deck of Méduse

In 1811, Méduse was sent off to Java with Nymphe, in a frigate division under Joseph-François Raoul. On 2 September, the division arrived at Surabaya tailed by the 32-gun British frigate HMS Bucephalus. Two days later, the British brig-sloop HMS Barracouta joined the chase but lost contact on 8 September. On 12 September, Méduse and Nymphe chased Bucephalus, which escaped and broke contact the next day. Méduse was back in Brest on 22 December, and continued her service in the Atlantic.

Between 27 and 29 December 1813, Méduse, in concert with the frigate Nymphe, captured seven British merchantmen at 16°N 39°W. (Note: The news item in Lloyd's List (LL) gave the names of the frigates as Nymphe and Modeste, but there was no Modeste in service with the French Navy at that time, but there was a Méduse, and she was operating with Nymphe.) The vessels captured were Prince George, Lady Caroline Barham, and Potsdam, all three coming from London and bound to Jamaica; Flora, from London to Martinique; Brazil Packet, from Madeira to the Brazils; and Rosario and Thetis, from Cape Verde. The French burnt all the vessels they captured, except Prince George. They put their prisoners into her and sent her off as a cartel to Barbados, which Prince George arrived at on 10 January 1814.

=== Bourbon Restoration ===
With the restoration of the French monarchy in 1814, Louis XVIII decided to restore Royalist and nobility dominance of the senior ranks of both the French Navy and Army. Consequently, Hugues Viscount Duroy de Chaumareys was appointed Capitaine de frégate and given command of Méduse; de Chaumareys had previous experience, but had been effectively retired for nearly 20 years.

== Course to Senegal ==
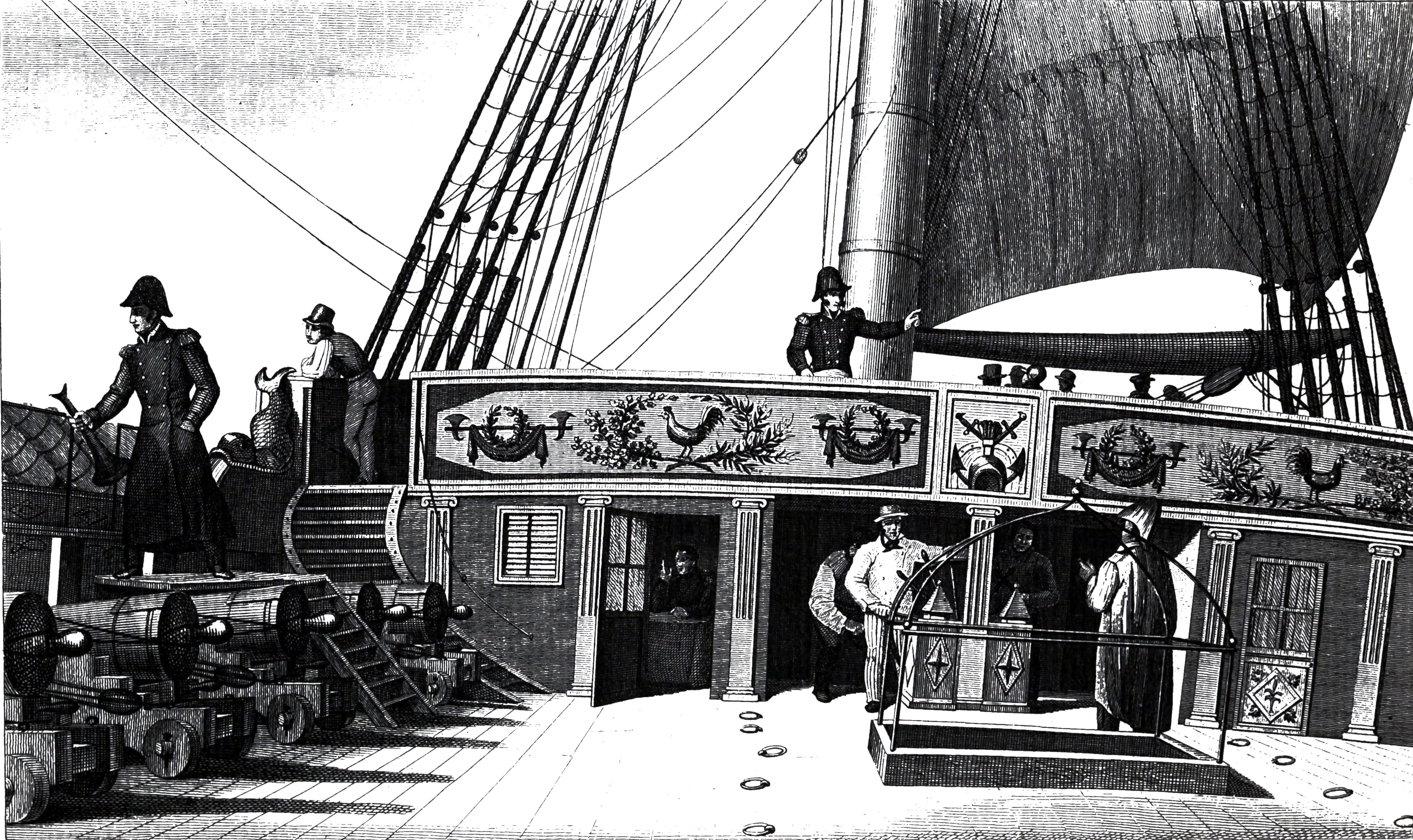
Aftercastle of Méduse, by Ambroise-Louis Garneray

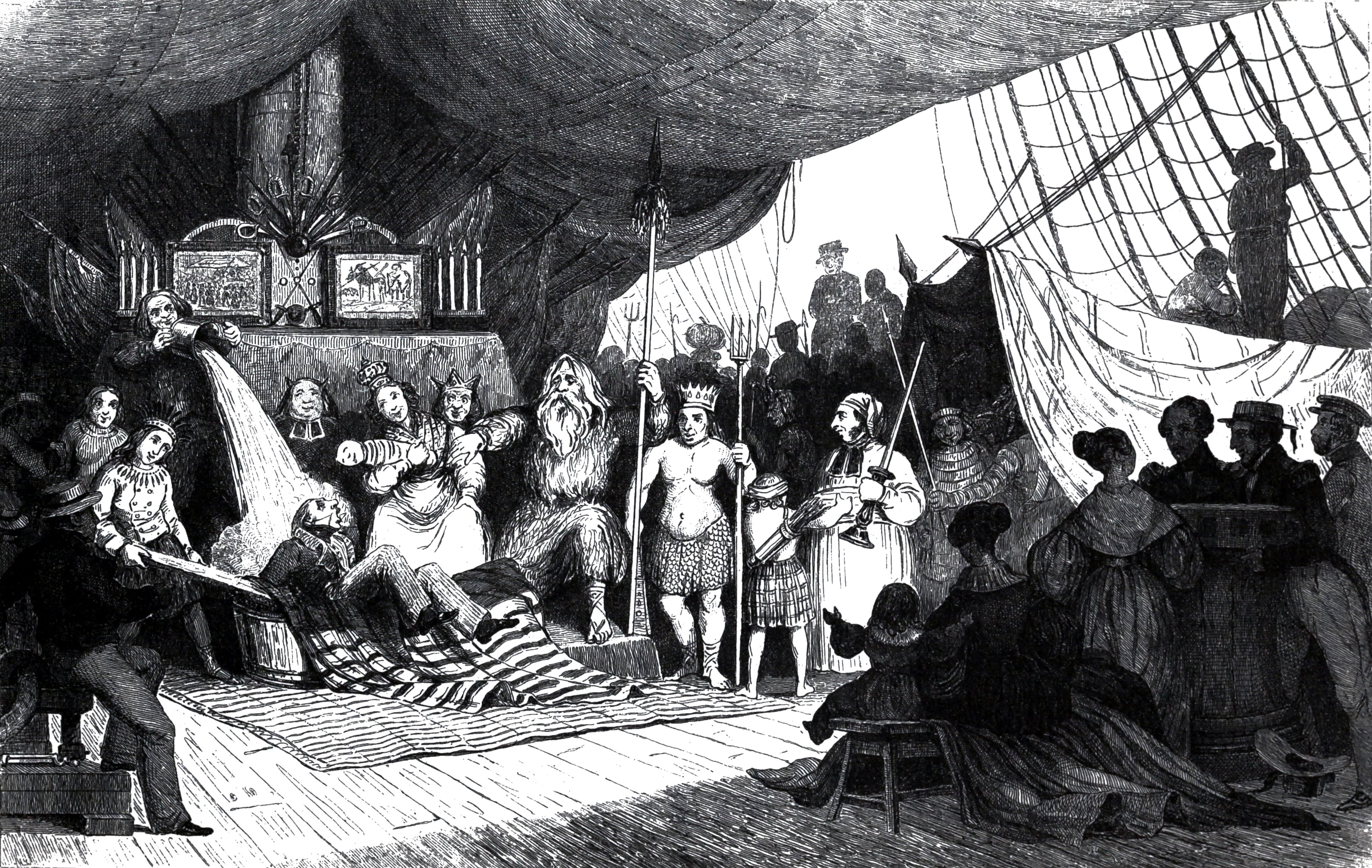
Line-crossing ceremony aboard Méduse on 1 July 1816

On 17 June 1816, a convoy under the command of Hugues Duroy de Chaumareys on Méduse departed Rochefort accompanied by the storeship Loire, the brig Argus and the corvette Écho to receive the British handover of the port of Saint-Louis in Senegal. Méduse, armed en flûte, carried many passengers, including the appointed French governor of Senegal, Colonel Julien-Désiré Schmaltz, his wife Reine Schmaltz, and his secretary, Joseph Jean-Baptiste Alexandre Griffon du Bellay. Méduse's complement totaled 400, including 160 crew plus a contingent of marine infantrymen intended to serve as the garrison of Saint-Louis. The ship reached the island of Madeira on 27 June.

Schmaltz then wanted to reach Saint-Louis as fast as possible, by the most direct route, although this would take the fleet dangerously close to the shore, where there were many sandbars and reefs. Experienced crews usually sailed further out. Méduse was the fastest of the convoy and, despite his orders to maintain the convoy, Captain Chaumareys quickly lost contact with Loire and Argus. Écho kept pace and attempted to guide Méduse, but to no avail; the smaller ship eventually gave up and moved further out.

Chaumareys further compounded his poor decisions by allowing an inexperienced passenger named Richefort to serve as navigator. Richefort was a philosopher and a member of the Philanthropic Society of Cape Verde; his appointment was a violation of naval service regulations. As Méduse neared the coast of Africa, Richefort apparently mistook a large cloud bank on the horizon for Cape Blanco on the African coast, and so underestimated the proximity of the Bank of Arguin off the coast of Mauritania.

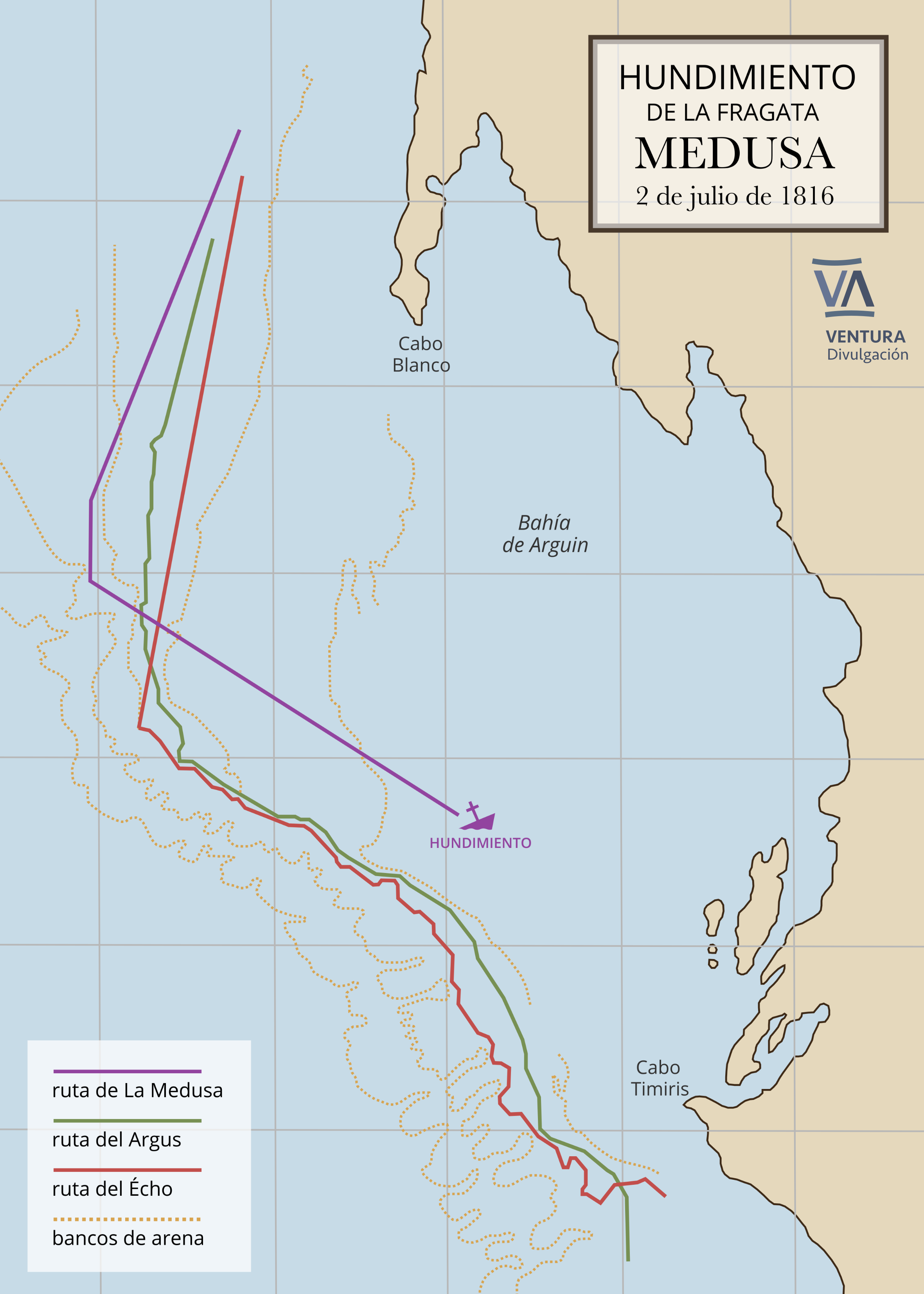
The route of the Méduse, the Argus, and the Écho

On 2 July 1816, now more than 160 kilometres (99 mi) off course, Méduse ran into increasingly shallow water, and neither the captain nor the navigator noticed dangerous signs such as the mud bottom starting to become visible. Eventually, First Lieutenant Maudet began taking soundings off the bow, and, measuring only 18 fathoms (33 m), recognized the danger. Chaumareys ordered the ship brought up into the wind, but it was too late, and Méduse ran aground 50 kilometres (31 mi) from the coast. The accident occurred at spring high tide, making it dangerous to re-float the ship without massive flooding. The captain failed to jettison the ship's heavy 14 three-tonne cannons and so the ship soon lodged deep in the mud.

=== Raft ===
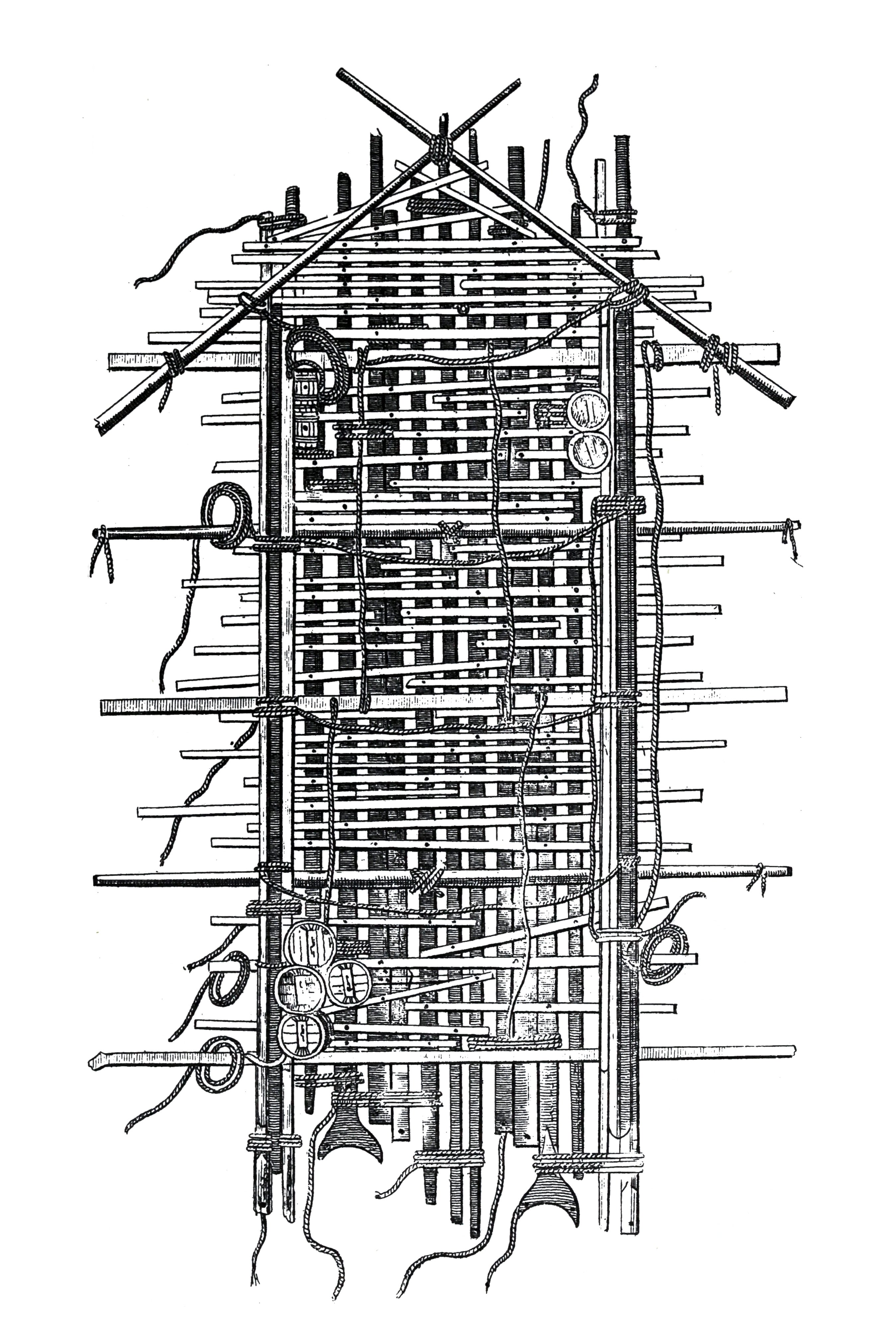
Plan du Radeau de la Méduse, au moment de son abandon ("Plan of the Raft of the Medusa at the moment of its abandonment"), frontispiece to Naufrage de la frégate Méduse by Alexandre Corréard and Jean-Baptiste Henri Savigny. Paris 1818, Bibliothèque nationale.

Méduse was not carrying enough lifeboats to transport all of the passengers to safety in a single trip. Instead, it was proposed that the ship's launches should ferry the passengers and crew to shore, 50 kilometres (31 mi) away, in two separate trips. Numerous ideas for lightening Méduse in an effort to lift her off the reef were also proposed, such as building a raft so cargo could be safely removed.

A raft measuring 20 metres (66 ft) long and 7 metres (23 ft) wide was soon constructed with salvaged wood planks and was nicknamed "la Machine" by the crew. On 5 July, a gale developed and Méduse's battered hull began to break up. The passengers and crew panicked, and Chaumareys decided to evacuate the frigate immediately rather than enact the original plan to make two trips. The raft was hastily repurposed for moving passengers and the Méduse's longboats were rigged to tow it behind them; this left 146 men and 1 woman on an improvised craft that struggled to hold their weight. The raft could carry few supplies, had no means of steering, no navigational tools, and took on water easily. Seventeen men, fearing disaster, chose to stay with the sinking Méduse and await rescue.

The crew in the launches soon found that pulling the raft slowed them down considerably and became worried that the passengers might overwhelm them. After travelling only a few kilometers, they cut the tow line and abandoned the raft's occupants. (Note: According to some sources, Governor Schmaltz's boat was first to drop the tow line to the raft.) The lifeboats, which carried the captain, Governor Schmaltz, and other high-ranking persons, were the first to reach the coast of Africa. Most of the boats' survivors made it to safety in French Senegal, though some died as they travelled overland.

On the raft, the situation deteriorated rapidly. Instead of water, only wine had been packed; drunken fights broke out between the officers and passengers on one hand, and the sailors and soldiers on the other. On the first night adrift, 20 men were killed or committed suicide. A storm then hit, and more survivors were either trampled to death in a panic or swept overboard to drown. Rations dwindled rapidly; by the fourth day there were only 67 people left alive on the raft, and some resorted to cannibalism at sea to survive. On the eighth day, the fittest decided to throw the weak and wounded overboard, leaving just 15 men remaining, all of whom survived another four days until their rescue on 17 July by the brig Argus, which accidentally encountered them.

== Aftermath ==
Argus took the survivors of the raft to Saint-Louis to recover. Five of them, including Jean Charles, the last African crew member, died within days. Chaumareys decided to rescue the gold that was still on board Méduse and sent out a salvage crew, which discovered that Méduse was still largely intact. Only three of the 17 men who had decided to stay on Méduse were still alive 54 days later. British naval officers helped the survivors to return to France because aid from the French Minister of the Marine was not forthcoming.

Méduse's surviving surgeon, Henri Savigny, and the governor's secretary submitted their account of the tragedy to the authorities. It was leaked to an anti-Bourbon newspaper, the Journal des débats, and was published on 13 September 1816. The incident quickly became a scandal in French politics and Bourbon officials tried to cover it up. At his court-martial at Port de Rochefort in 1817, Chaumareys was tried on five counts but acquitted of abandoning his squadron, of failing to re-float his ship and of abandoning the raft; however, he was found guilty of incompetent and complacent navigation and of abandoning Méduse before all her passengers had been taken off. Even though this verdict exposed him to the death penalty, Chaumareys was sentenced to only three years in jail. The court-martial was widely thought to be a "whitewash." The Gouvion de Saint-Cyr Law later ensured that promotions in the French military would thereafter be based on merit.

Savigny and another survivor, the geographer-engineer Alexandre Corréard, subsequently wrote a book with their own account (Naufrage de la frégate la Méduse) of the incident, published in 1817. It went through five editions by 1821 and was also published with success in English, German, Dutch, Italian, and Korean translations. A revision of the text in later editions increased the political thrust of the work.

=== Shipwreck site ===
In 1980, a French marine archaeological expedition led by Jean-Yves Blot located the Méduse shipwreck site off the coast of modern-day Mauritania. The primary search tool was a one-of-a-kind magnetometer developed by the CEA.

The search area was defined on the basis of the accounts of survivors of Méduse and, more importantly, on the records of an 1817 French coastal mapping expedition that found the vessel's remains still projecting above the waves. The background research proved to be so good that the expedition team located the shipwreck site on the first day of searching. They then recovered enough artifacts to identify the wreck positively and to mount an exhibit in the Marine Museum in Paris.

== In popular culture ==
=== Géricault's painting ===
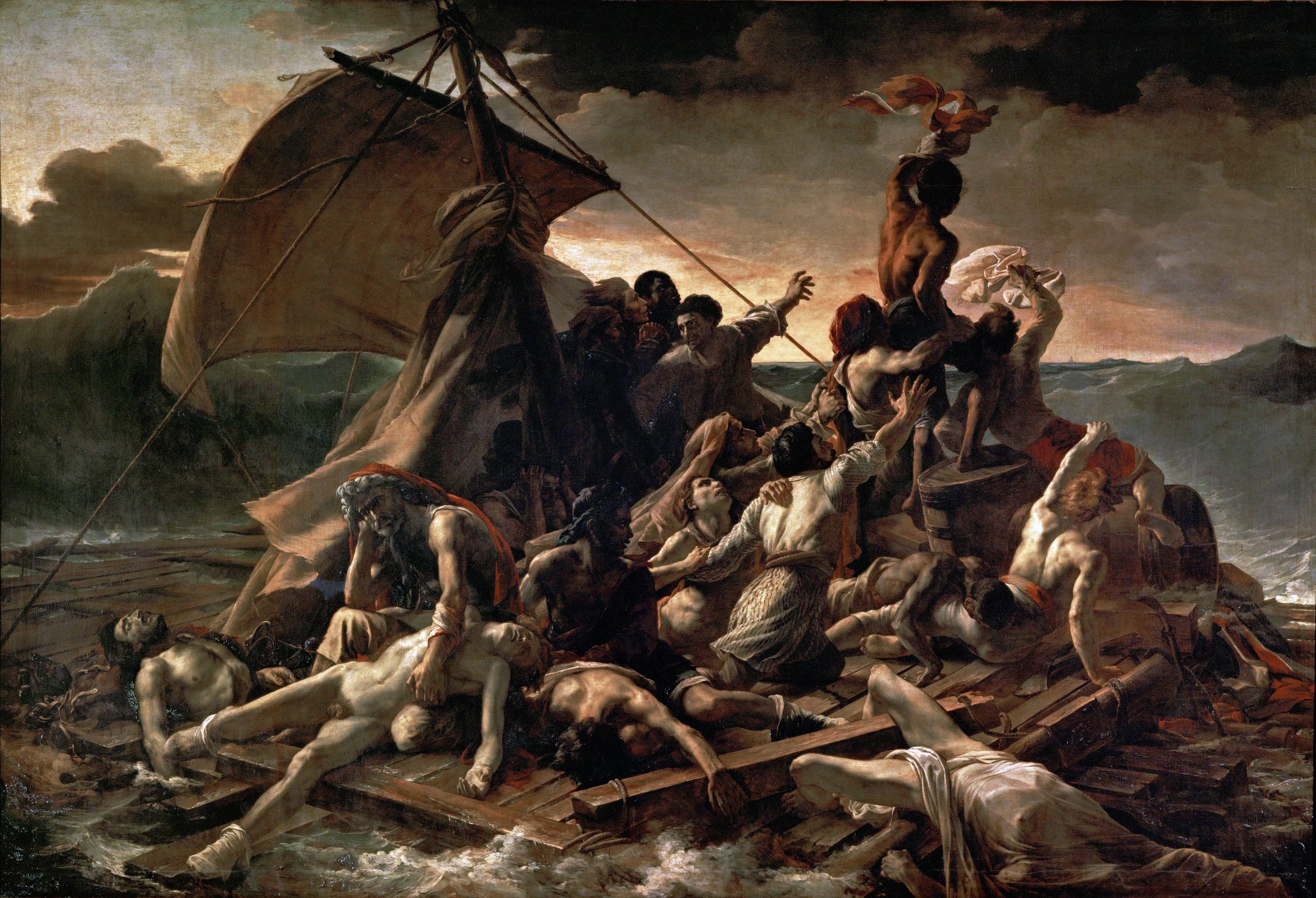
The Raft of the Medusa (1819) by Théodore Géricault

Impressed by accounts of the shipwreck, the 25-year-old artist Théodore Géricault decided to create an oil painting based on the incident and contacted the writers in 1818. His work depicts a moment recounted by one of the survivors: prior to their rescue, the passengers saw a ship on the horizon, which they tried to signal. She disappeared, and in the words of one of the surviving crew members, "From the delirium of joy, we fell into profound despondency and grief". The ship Argus reappeared two hours later and rescued those who remained. The painting, titled The Raft of the Medusa, is considered an iconic work of the French Romantic movement and Géricault's masterpiece. It is on display in the Louvre.

=== Film ===
- Le Radeau de la Méduse (1994), directed by Iradj Azimi and starring Jean Yanne as Chaumareys, Daniel Mesguich as Coudein, Alain Macé as Henri Savigny, Claude Jade as Reine Schmaltz, Philippe Laudenbach as Julien Schmaltz, Michel Baumann as Alexandre Corréard and Laurent Terzieff as Théodore Géricault

=== Music ===
- Friedrich von Flotow wrote the opera Le naufrage de la Méduse (1839), based on this sad case.
- French songwriter and poet Georges Brassens alludes to the raft of Méduse in his song "Les copains d'abord" (1964). The song is a hymn to friendship, symbolised by the crew of a ship named "Les Copains d'Abord" ("Friends first"), and in the first verse it says that she was not "the raft of Méduse".
- German composer Hans Werner Henze wrote an oratorio, Das Floß der Medusa, in 1968 in memory of Che Guevara
- "Raft of the Medusa", a track from the 2012 album Static on the Airwaves by Levellers
- "Le Radeau de La Méduse", a track from the 2021 album A Dream of Wilderness by Aephanemer (Symphonic Melodic Death Metal band based in Toulouse, France)
- "The Doom of Medusa", a track from the 2018 album Codex Epicus by Battleroar (Heavy Metal band based in Athens, Greece)

=== Literature ===
- Das Floß der Medusa (The Raft of the Medusa; 1940–1943), a play by German dramatist Georg Kaiser
- Wreck of the Medusa by Alexander McKee, a narrative account of the final voyage, shipwreck and aftermath originally published in 1976 under the title Death Raft and reprinted in 2007. McKee draws upon multiple sources and provides analysis of the event in relation to similar maritime and aeronautical disasters.
- The second volume of Peter Weiss's novel Die Ästhetik des Widerstands (The Aesthetics of Resistance), originally published in 1978, opens with a detailed historical account of Méduse and subsequently describes Géricault's painting
- In A History of the World in 10½ Chapters (1989) by Julian Barnes, a semi-fictional work that attempts to deglaze and satirise popular historical legends, the chapter "Shipwreck" is devoted to analysis of the Géricault painting, with the first half narrating the incidents leading to the shipwreck and the survival of the crew members. The second half of the chapter renders a dark platonic and satirical analysis of the painting itself, and Géricault's "softening" the impact of crude reality in order to preserve the aestheticism of the work.
- Ocean Sea (1993), a novel by Alessandro Baricco. The "second book" describes the event from the point of view of Méduse's surviving surgeon, Henri Savigny, and a sailor, both of them on the raft.
- "Boot Mat (After Gericault's Raft of the Medusa)," a poem by Ken Babstock, published in his collection, Days into Flatspin.
- Das Floß der Medusa. Roman. Paul Zsolnay Verlag, Wien 2017, ISBN 978-3-5520-5816-3, by Franzobel

=== Other references ===
- The rock group Great White used the Géricault painting as the cover art for their 1994 album Sail Away
- Irish folk-rock group The Pogues used the famous painting as the album cover for their second album Rum Sodomy & the Lash (1985), with the faces of the band members replacing those of the men on the raft. Also, on their album Hell's Ditch (1990), they pay tribute to the incident with the song "The Wake of the Medusa".
- German funeral doom band Ahab used the Géricault painting as the cover for their album The Divinity of Oceans.
- The layout of the scene is copied in the French comic book Astérix Légionnaire (Goscinny/Uderzo, 1967) to depict yet another shipwreck of Astérix's recurring pirate enemies. The captain's comment is the pun, "Je suis médusé" ("I am dumbfounded"). In their English translation, Anthea Bell and Derek Hockridge replaced this pun with a different joke specifically relating to the painting, having the captain say, "We've been framed, by Jericho!"
- In The Adventures of Tintin comic The Red Sea Sharks, while the protagonists are escaping on a raft, a wave washes Captain Haddock off; he climbs back on with a jellyfish on his head. Tintin asks him: "Do you think this is some raft of Méduse?" ("Méduse" is the French word for "jellyfish")
- In Arthur C. Clarke's 2061: Odyssey Three (1987), Dr. Heywood Floyd's friends give him a print of the painting as a tongue-in-cheek going-away present for his trip to Halley's comet. Their inscription reads, "Getting there is half the fun."
- In the 1988 novel The Silence of the Lambs by Thomas Harris, Dr. Lecter's mind wanders to Géricault's anatomical studies for The Raft of the Medusa while waiting for Senator Martin to focus on their conversation
- In Episode 5 of the 2018 AMC series The Terror, "First Shot a Winner, Lads," Franklin Expedition commander Captain Francis Crozier, on seeing one of his non-commissioned officers approach with a party from HMS Erebus, quips, "Ah, Edward! How fares the Raft of the Medusa?" – clearly a black humor reference to the 1816 disaster, but also an ominous foreshadowing of his own expedition's ultimately tragic fate, which would also be marred by incidents of cannibalism in the face of starvation among the crew in their final months.

== See also ==
- Lists of shipwrecks
- List of French political scandals
- R v Dudley and Stephens
