= Alexandre Corréard =

French engineer and geographer (1788–1857)

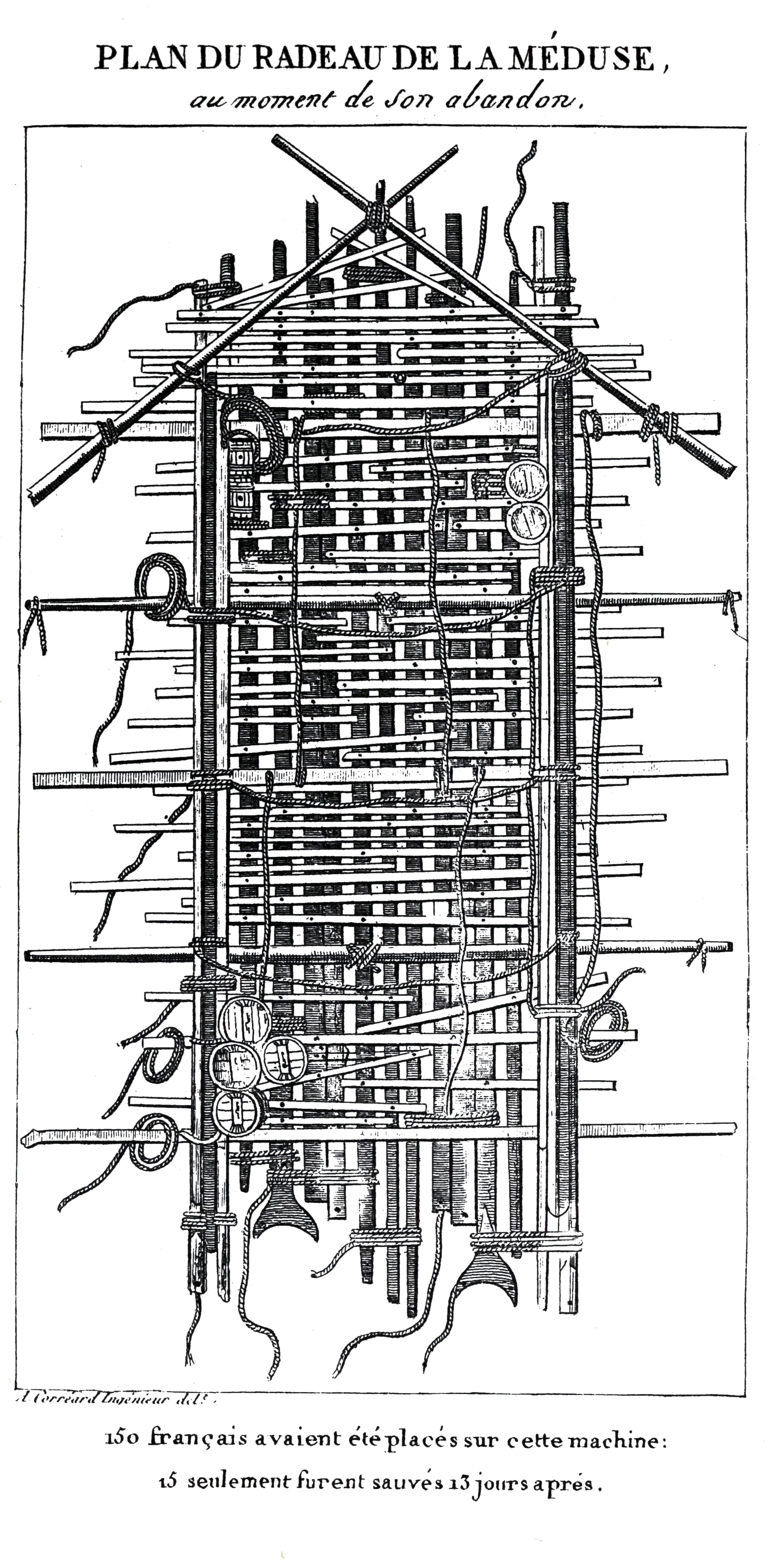

Alexandre Corréard (8 October 1788 – 16 February 1857) was a French engineer and geographer. He graduated from the engineering school Arts et Métiers ParisTech. He is known for escaping the French frigate Méduse shipwreck and working with Théodore Géricault when he was painting The Raft of the Medusa.

== Biography ==
On June 17, 1816, he boarded the frigate La Méduse as an engineer-geographer. On July 2, the ship ran aground on the Arguin Bank off the coast of Mauritania. Corréard was one of fifteen survivors of the raft of La Méduse, which carried 147 people. In Théodore Géricault famous painting, he is the man in the main group reaching out toward the horizon . Upon his return to France, he lost his position as engineer of the Cayenne colony due to the unauthorized publication of the first account of the shipwreck in 1817. Licensed as a bookseller on September 9, 1818, he set up shop as a publisher and bookseller at 258 Palais Royal, Galerie de bois, under the sign Au naufrage de la Méduse (The Shipwreck of the Medusa), and published, with great success, the account of the shipwreck written with the Medusa's naval doctor, Henri Savigny. In 1825, he founded the Journal des sciences militaires (Journal of Military Science) and in 1828, the Journal du Génie civil, des sciences et des arts (Journal of Civil Engineering, Science, and Arts). He then became interested in railways and drew up plans for the future Gare d'Austerlitz railway station . He published numerous pamphlets that got him into legal trouble, which he recounts in the reissues of his book. His bookshop became a meeting place for writers and politicians hostile to the Bourbon Restoration in France, whose pamphlets he published. Corréard was also an influential member of the Chevaliers de la Liberté, a clandestine organization of the Charbonnerie whose goal was to proclaim the advent of Napoleon II and overthrow Louis XVIII. After a series of nine convictions and a total of eight years in prison, his license was revoked by royal decree on September 25, 1822, his business was closed, and 8,000 volumes were seized during the sale of his stock.

He ran unsuccessfully in the 1848 elections . From 1847 onwards, he retired to Avon, near Fontainebleau, where he remained until his death in 1857.
