= Bussière-Boffy =

- Part of Val-d'Issoire
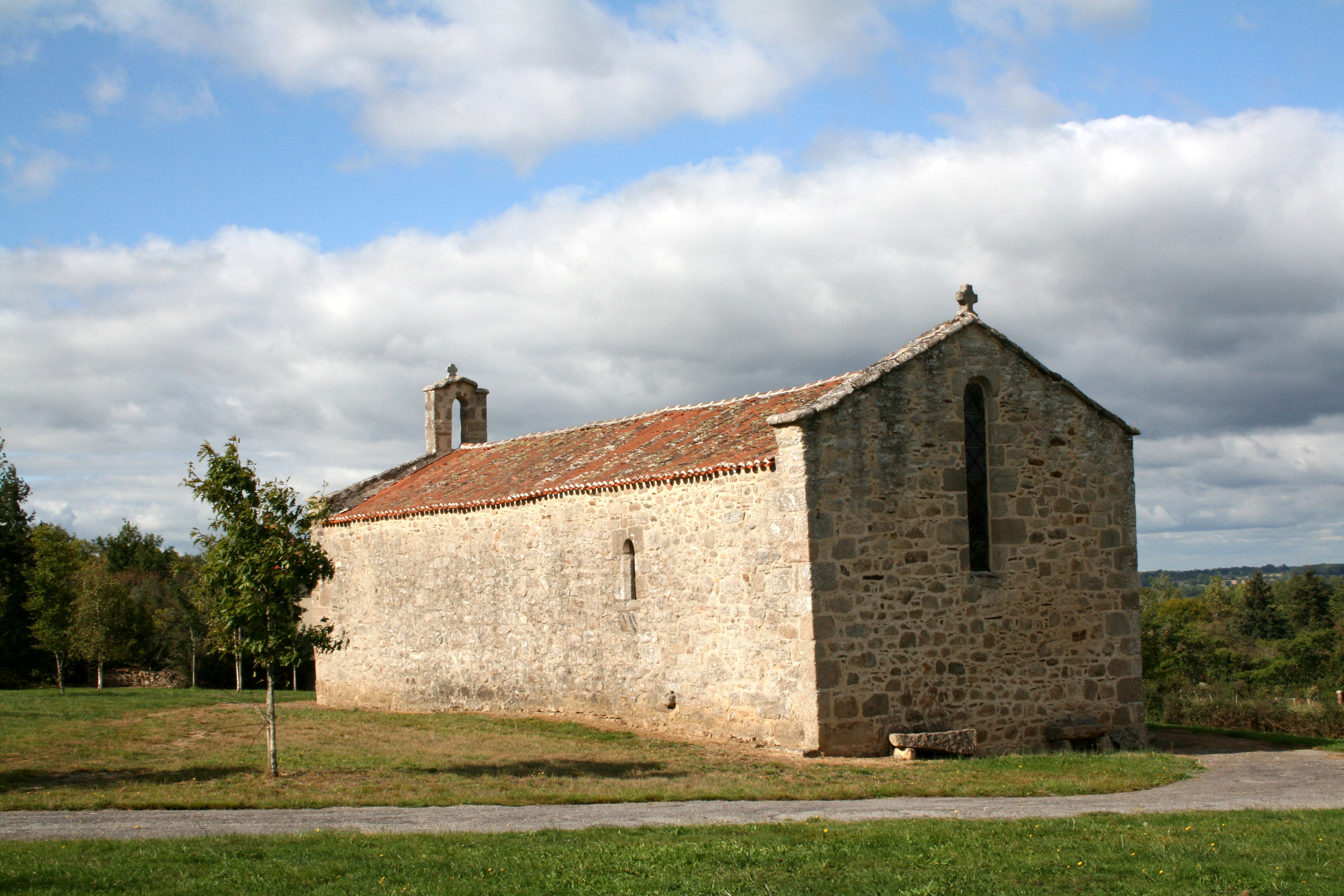
- The chapel of Saint-Jean-Baptiste, in Bussière-Boffy

- Coat of arms
- Location of Bussière-Boffy
- Location within France Location within Nouvelle-Aquitaine
- Coordinates: 46°03′04″N 0°51′17″E
- Country: France
- Region: Nouvelle-Aquitaine
- Department: Haute-Vienne
- Arrondissement: Bellac
- Canton: Bellac
- Commune: Val-d'Issoire
- Area^{1}: 27.44 km^{2} (10.59 sq mi)
- Highest elevation: 344 m (1,129 ft)
- Lowest elevation: 170 m (560 ft)
- Population (2022): 283
  - Density: 10.3/km^{2} (26.7/sq mi)
- Time zone: UTC+01:00 (CET)
  - Summer (DST): UTC+02:00 (CEST)
- Postal code: 87330
- ^{1} French Land Register data, which excludes lakes, ponds, glaciers > 1 km^{2} (0.386 sq mi or 247 acres) and river estuaries.

Bussière-Boffy (French pronunciation: [bysjɛʁ bɔfi]; Occitan: Bussiéra Bòufin) is a former commune in the Haute-Vienne department in western France. On 1 January 2016, it was merged with Mezières-sur-Issoire into the new commune Val-d'Issoire.

The "Place de l'Église" (formerly "Le Bourg"), is now known as "Place Notre-Dame". Mezières-sur-Issoire retains its "Place de l'Église".

Inhabitants are known as Bussiérands.

2022 Presidential Election: the mayor Jean-Paul BARRIERE has sponsored far right candidate Eric ZEMMOUR. The mayor of Val d'Issoire (Pascal GODRIE), has yet to declare any sponsorship as of 11/02/2022.

== See also ==
- Communes of the Haute-Vienne department
