= Greg Semu =

New Zealand photographic artist

Gregory Alan Semu (born 1971, in Auckland) is a New Zealand-born photographic artist of Samoan descent. In 1995 his exhibition O le Tatau Samona / The Tatoo Arts of Samoa was the first solo exhibition by a photographer of Samoan heritage at Auckland Art Gallery.

== Career ==
Semu is largely self-taught as an artist and film-maker. In 1994 Semu was included in the landmark exhibition Bottled Ocean (1994), curated by Jim Vivieaere. His work for Bottled Ocean was a graffiti-inspired corrugated iron work that reflected on the 'gritty realities of Pacific communities living in suburban Auckland'. In 1994 Semu also directed the music video for New Zealand hip hop group Sisters Underground's classic song ‘In the Neighbourhood’.

In 2007 Semu was invited to be the inaugural artist in residence at the newly opened Musee du Quai Branly. The museum invited Semu to respond to a piece of advertising collateral, the 'Bonded by Blood' poster, which had been gifted to Quai Branly, to commemorate the All Blacks' 2006 tour of France and the 2007 Rugby World Cup. The 'Bonded by Blood' poster depicts the All Blacks performing their signature haka 'Ka Mate Ka Mate' in a rain forest setting with ancestral Māori figures silhouetted in the foliage. In what curator Reuben Friend describes as "an act of subversion", the photographs Semu produced show "fictitious scenes of Māori ‘warriors’ engaged in battle, seemingly celebrating the fighting spirit of Māori while addressing the objectionable stereotypes of Pacific people as 'primitive' and 'savage'." The series, titled The Battle of the Noble Savage, has been shown at a number of galleries, including City Gallery Wellington and Te Manawa in New Zealand.

Semu has also worked as a commercial photographer. In 2010 he took portraits of New Zealand-born Polynesian rugby league players for a calendar produced by the Casula Powerhouse as a fundraiser and community outreach project for the Pasifika community.

In 2012 Semu placed an archive of his negatives, proof sheets and film reels, diaries and ephemera, and examples of his commercial work, on long-term loan to the Auckland Art Gallery.

In 2016 Semu's exhibition The Raft of the Tagata Pasifika (People of the Pacific) was shown at the National Gallery of Victoria. Part of his ongoing exploration of the colonisation and Christianisation of the Pacific, these works also reference the genre of European history paintings from this period. In them Semu works with indigenous actors in the Cook Islands to re-stage and photograph two important 19th century paintings: Théodore Géricault's The Raft of the Medusa (1819) and Louis John Steele and Charles F Goldie’s The Arrival of the Maoris in New Zealand (1898).

The 2010 his work The Last Cannibal Supper, Cause Tomorrow We Become Christians directly references the Leonardo da Vinci's The Last Supper. It was created while on residency at the Tjibaou Cultural Centre, New Caledonia and is a large mural-sized work.

In Semu’s last supper, he draws attention to the negative impact of colonial intrusion into indigenous cultures and questions notions of the primitive and savage, while attempting to regain lost heritage by restaging grand European narratives with indigenous people taking centre stage. (Coconet, 2010)

== Awards and residencies ==
- 2007 Inaugural Artist in residence, Musée du Quai Branly
- 2008 Artist in residence Unitec Institute of Technology
- 2009 Artist in residence, Kaohsiung Museum of Fine Arts, Kaohsiung City, Taiwan
- 2010 Artist residency, Tjibaou Cultural Centre
- 2011 Artist residency Elcho Island Arts, Elcho Island, Northern Territory, Australia
- 2014 Resident artist at Buku-Larrnggay Mulka Centre, Yirrkala, Northern Territory, Australia; Creative New Zealand Visual Arts Residency at the Kunstlerhaus Bethanien, Berlin

== Further information ==
- Greg Semu Archive, Auckland Art Gallery
- Interview with Greg Semu produced by City Gallery Wellington, 2011
- Interview with Greg Semu, Radio Australia, 2012
- John Hurrell, Review of 'The Battle of the Noble Savage', EyeContact, 2 September 2013
- Artwork in the French public collections, Musée d'art contemporain de Lyon
