= The Legend of the Voyage to New Zealand =

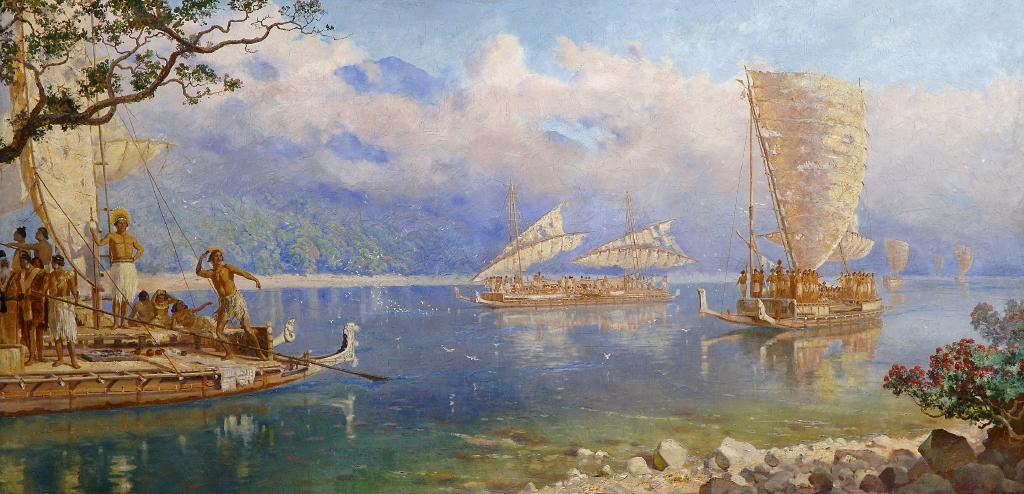
- Artist: Kennett Watkins
- Year: 1912
- Medium: Oil on canvas
- Dimensions: 1321 mm × 2667 mm (52.0 in × 105.0 in)
- Location: Auckland Art Gallery, Auckland

The Legend of the Voyage to New Zealand is an oil painting by the New Zealand painter Kennett Watkins (1847–1933). Painted in 1912 and bequeathed to the Auckland Art Gallery the following year, it portrays the arrival of Māori seafaring canoes in New Zealand. The work was influential in supporting the now discredited theory that the settlement of Māori in New Zealand resulted from the arrival of a 'Grand Fleet' of migration canoes.

== Background ==
In the late 19th century, there was growing ethnographic interest in the origin of the Māori population in New Zealand, with the dominant theory being advanced by Stephenson Percy Smith, this being the existence of a 'Grand Fleet' of seven canoes that arrived in about 1350 from Rarotonga, in the Cook Islands. Smith argued that this Grand Fleet followed the supposed discovery of New Zealand by the Polynesian explorer Kupe, sailing from Hawaiki, the traditional supposed homeland of Polynesians, in about 750, and its rediscovery in the 9th century by Toi and Whatonga; the latter allegedly found the country was inhabited by the Moriori people, a primitive race of Polynesians, which were wiped out by those people of the Grand Fleet.

The perception in New Zealand in the late 1800s was that the Māori population was dying out as a result of contact with superior western civilisation. The concept of the 'Grand Fleet', which resulted in the demise of the Moriori, tied into this view and in the settlers' minds justified the colonisation of New Zealand by Europeans and the decline of the Māori people. It was against this backdrop that Sir George Grey, a former Premier of New Zealand who had an interest in the culture of indigenous peoples, urged artists to record aspects of the Māori people with a view to preserving them for posterity.

Kennett Watkins was an English artist, born in 1847, who had emigrated to New Zealand in 1874 and subsequently became the headmaster of the Auckland Free School of Arts. He executed historical paintings of landscapes and events, particularly those involving the Māori people, and by the 1880s had established a reputation for works of this nature and was a pioneer in the visual depiction of New Zealand history. Watkins was keenly interested in Smith's theory of a Grand Fleet, writing and lecturing on the topic and in 1906, he produced the oil painting Departure of the Six Canoes from Raratonga for New Zealand, AD1350, a large work of 1075 mm by 2140 mm (42.3 in by 84.2 in). This was followed six years later by the more ambitious work, The Legend of the Voyage to New Zealand.

== Description and execution ==
The Legend of the Voyage to New Zealand was painted with oils on a canvas measuring 1321 mm by 2667 mm (52.0 in by 105.0 in) and depicts several twin-hulled canoe making landfall in New Zealand on a bright, summer morning. The setting is a calm inlet with a backdrop of green hills, obscured by clouds of mist. In the foreground is the shoreline, with a pōhutukawa tree in the right hand corner of the painting.

In his work, Watkins alludes to an event which has its basis in a tradition concerning two of the migration canoes, Tainui and Arawa, that set out for New Zealand from Hawaiki. At the time of their arrival at Whangaparāoa, near Cape Runaway, in summer, the pōhutukawa tree with its distinct, bright red flowers, was in bloom. Believing the flowers to be birds, many of the Māori voyagers, including their chief Tauninihi, discarded their red feathered headwear, or kura, which was sourced from the birds of Hawaiki. They were disappointed when they realised their mistake.

Some artistic licence was taken with the features of the depicted canoes and as early as the 1920s, it was recognised that certain details were inaccurate. For example, ethnographer Elsdon Best, writing in 1925, commented that rigging details were inconsistent with the period of the canoe shown in the painting. In the defence of Watkins, at the time there was limited knowledge of the configuration and construction of the canoes in which Māori first arrived in New Zealand. It has also been conceded that contemporary artists depicting aspects of Māori culture often made similar errors of ethnology.

== Reception ==
When it was first exhibited, at the Auckland Society of Arts (ASA) in 1912, The Legend of the Voyage to New Zealand was immediately and positively received; it was deemed the ASA's 'Picture of the Year' and was described as "well worthy of praise". It also served as a positive contrast to the similarly themed but more bleak and desperate, The Arrival of the Maoris in New Zealand, painted by C. F. Goldie and Louis Steele in 1899.

Among Māori viewers, Watkin's work was viewed less favourably. A commentator noted that of Watkins's The Legend of the Voyage to New Zealand, and Goldie and Steele's The Arrival of the Maoris in New Zealand, Māori elders held "...dubious feelings and disdain. To them they are mere creations of the pakeha mind and not consistent with the traditional records of the matters represented." Furthermore at least one critic assessed Watkin's work as lacking in "atmosphere... and the modelling of figures is wooden."

Priced at £100, the painting was acquired by a firm of land agents, Samuel Vaile & Sons. It was subsequently gifted to the Auckland Art Gallery in January 1913 where it was displayed in the colonial art section. In the years following its production, The Legend of the Voyage to New Zealand played a role in mythologising the arrival of Māori in New Zealand in a 'Grand Fleet', as postulated by Smith. However the hypothesis soon fell out of favour particularly given Smith's reasoning for an arrival date of 1350 was discovered to be flawed. He had also misrepresented the existence of Kupe, Toi and Whatonga, and there was no evidence of the presence of Moriori people in New Zealand prior to the arrival of Māori. By the 1960s, it was recognised that migration canoes travelling alone, or perhaps in pairs, from multiple points of origin were the most likely explanation for how Māori came to settle New Zealand.

The painting has remained in the collection of the Auckland Art Gallery since its gifting. As of 2026, it is on display.
