= Kennett Watkins =

New Zealand painter (1847–1933)

- Born: Charles Henry Kennett Watkins; 14 July 1847; Ooty, Tamil Nadu, India
- Died: 31 July 1933 (aged 86); Mercury Bay, Waikato, New Zealand
- Resting place: Whitianga Public Cemetery
- Known for: New Zealand landscape scenes

Charles Henry Kennett Watkins (14 July 1847 – 31 July 1933) was a New Zealand artist who was known for his New Zealand landscape paintings. He also painted scenes from the New Zealand Wars as well as of Māori life and history.

== Biography ==
Charles Henry Kennett Watkins was born in Ootacamund, India to Major John Watkins of the Indian Army. After attending Wellington College and studying in Switzerland and France, Kennett immigrated to New Zealand at the age of twenty-seven where he first found work as a photographer before teaching in Russell. In 1876, he moved to Auckland where he found work as an art teacher, becoming the first and only headmaster of the Auckland Free School of Art. In the same year, he married Clara Eliza Alice Davis at Kerikeri and had four children.

His 1912 painting 'The legend of the voyage to New Zealand', a depiction of the arrival of the 'Great Fleet' of migration canoes in 1350, played a role in mythologising the arrival of Māori in New Zealand. It was gifted to the Auckland Art Gallery in 1913.

Kennett retired in 1915 and settled in the East Cape and later in Dannevirke. In 1931, he moved to Mercury Bay. He continued to paint in his retirement and died on 31 July 1933 in Mercury Bay. Survived by his wife and three children, he was buried at Whitianga Public Cemetery.

== Notable works ==
- Waikato River, (oil on canvas, 1881)
- The Haunt of the Moa, a scene in Puriri Forest, (oil on canvas, 1885)
- The Phantom Canoe: A Legend of Lake Tarawera, (oil on canvas, 1888)
- The blowing up of the Boyd, (oil on canvas, 1889)
- Arrival of Captain Cook; An incident in the Bay of Islands, 29 November 1769, (oil on cardboard, 1890)
- The Death of Von Tempsky at Te Ngutu o Te Manu, (oil on canvas, 1893)
- Departure of the Six Canoes from Raratonga for New Zealand, AD1350, (oil on canvas, 1906)
- The Legend of the Voyage to New Zealand, (oil on canvas, 1912)

== Gallery ==
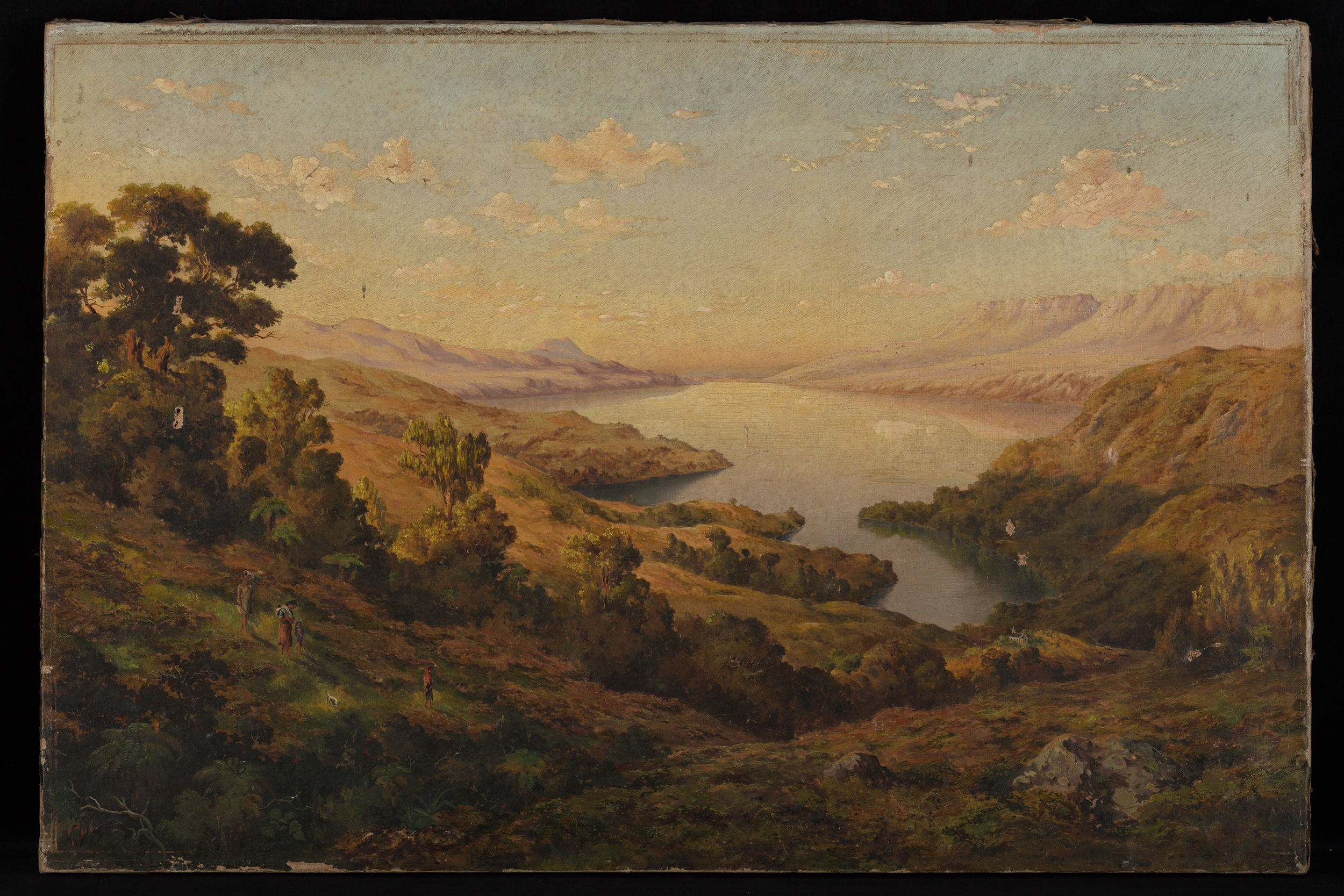
Wairoa, Lake Tarawera (1877)

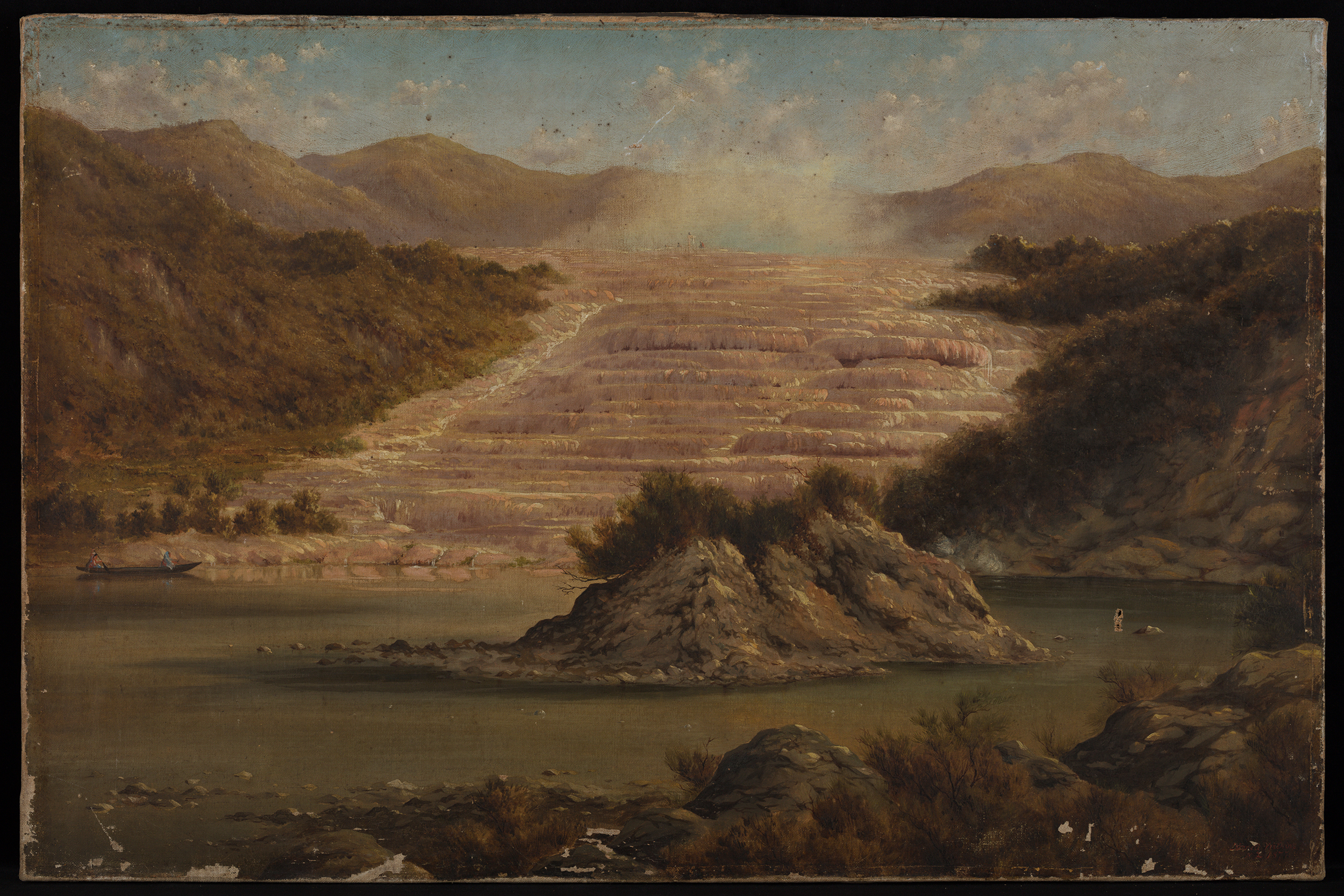
The Pink Terraces of Rotomahana (1877)

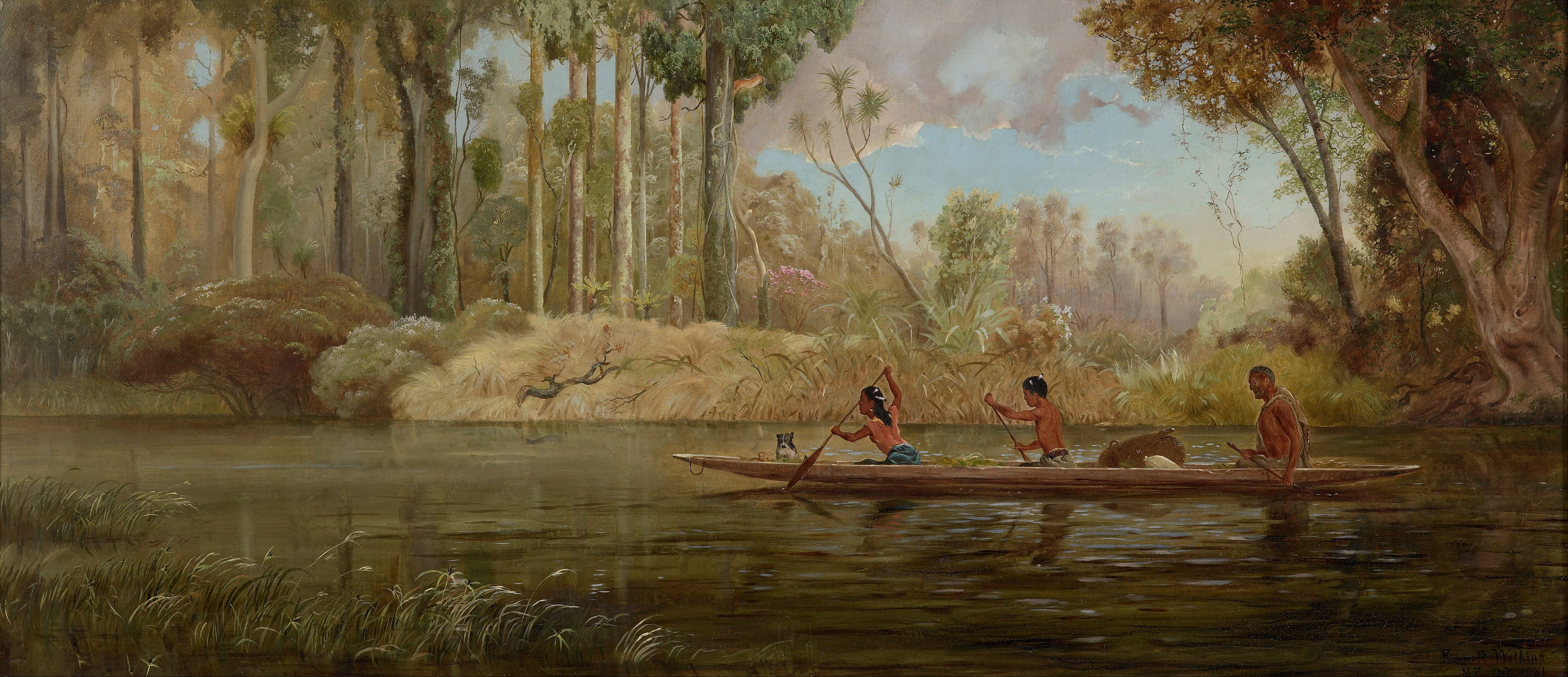
Waikato River (1881)

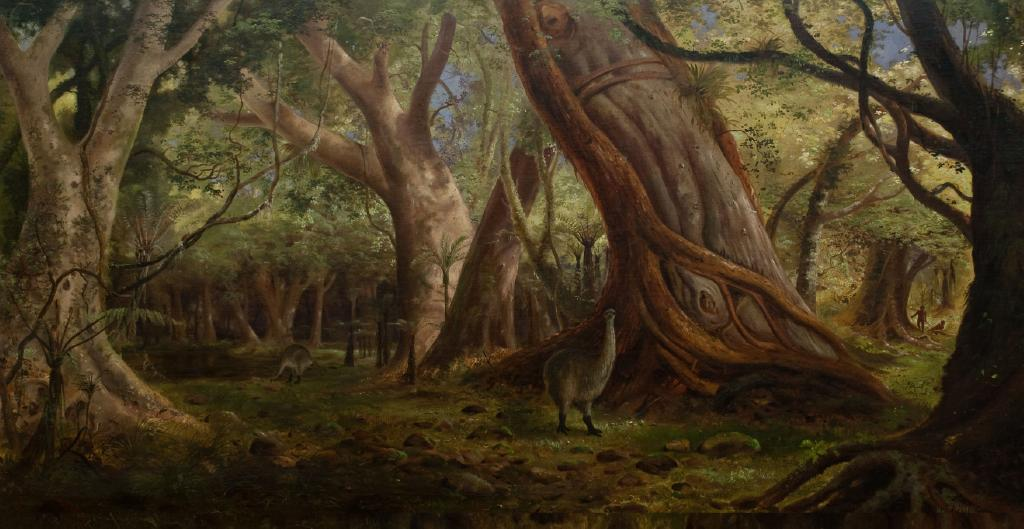
The Haunt of the Moa (1885)

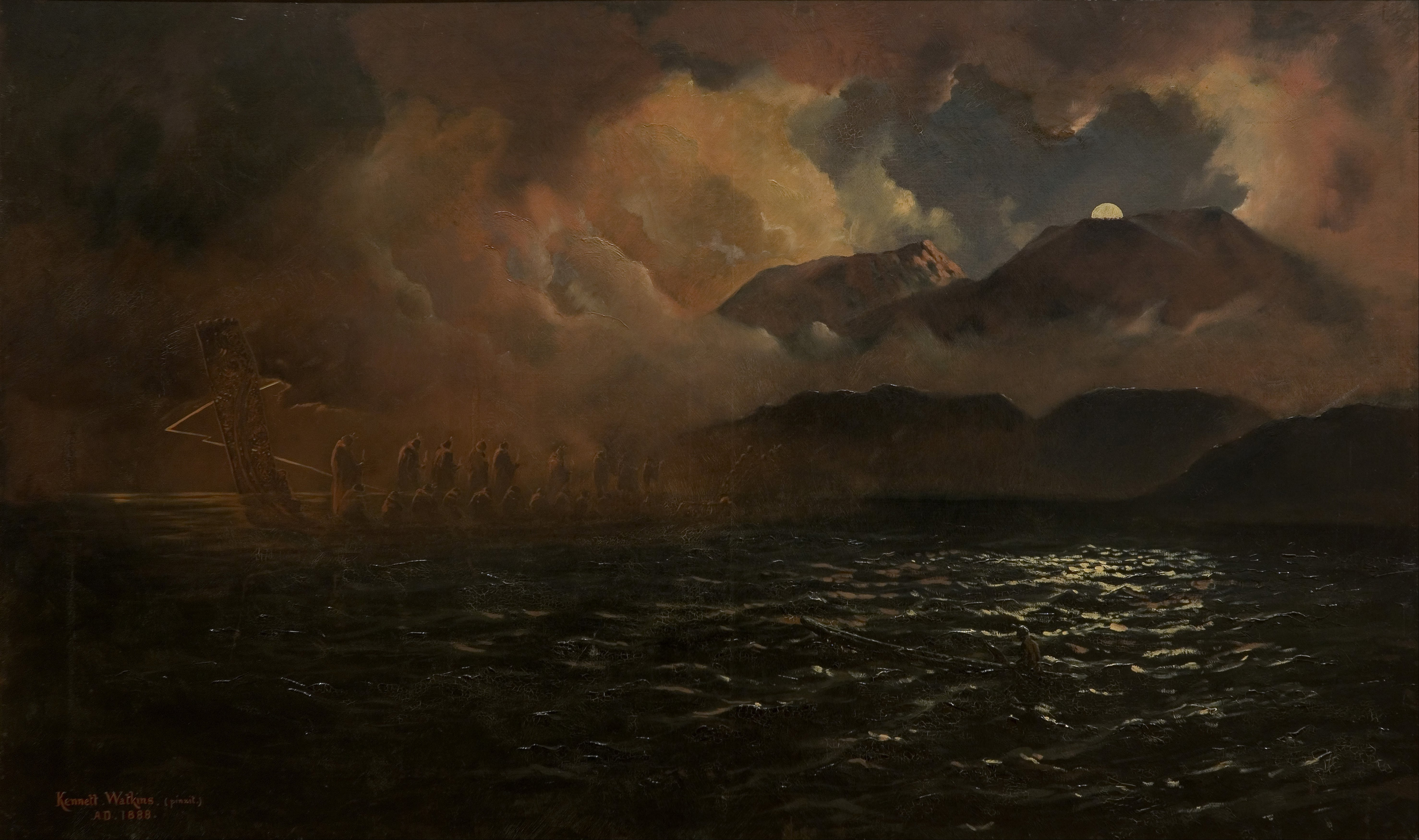
The Phantom Canoe: A Legend of Lake Tarawera (1888)

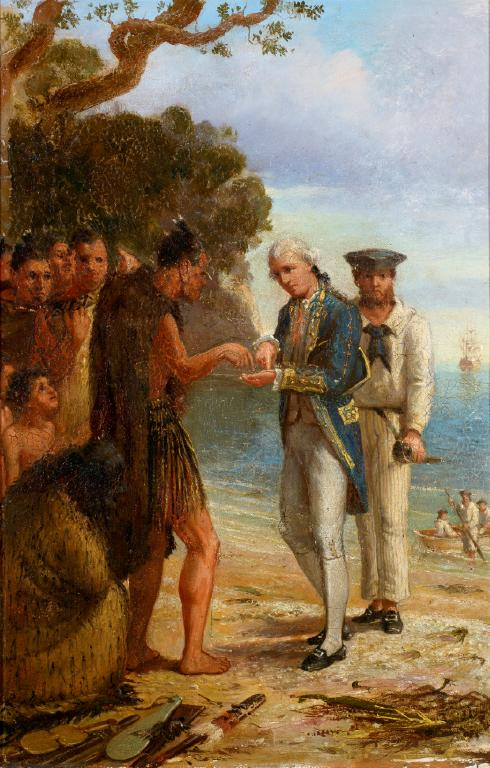
Arrival of Captain Cook; An incident in the Bay of Islands, 29 November 1769 (1890)

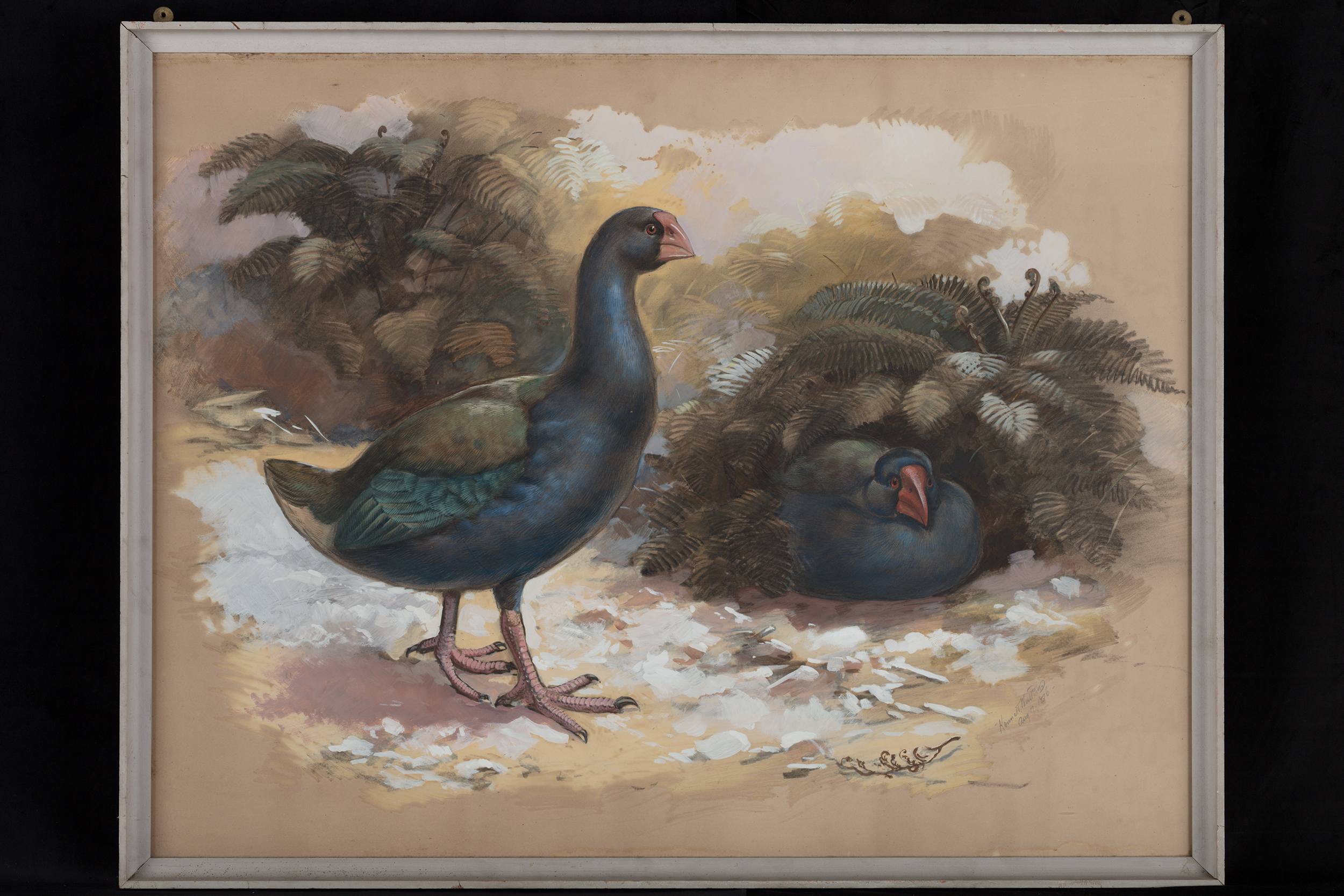
Untitled painting of two takahē (1896)

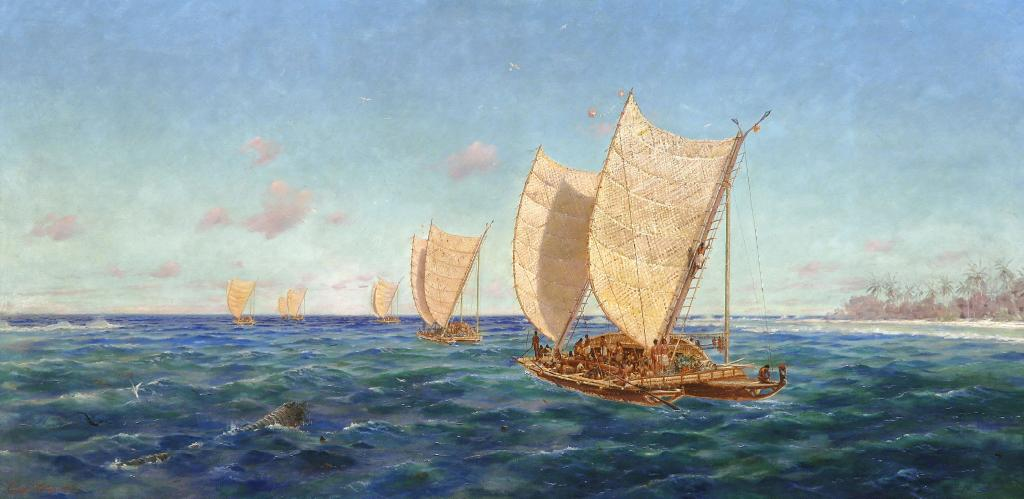
Departure of the six canoes from Raratonga for New Zealand (1906)

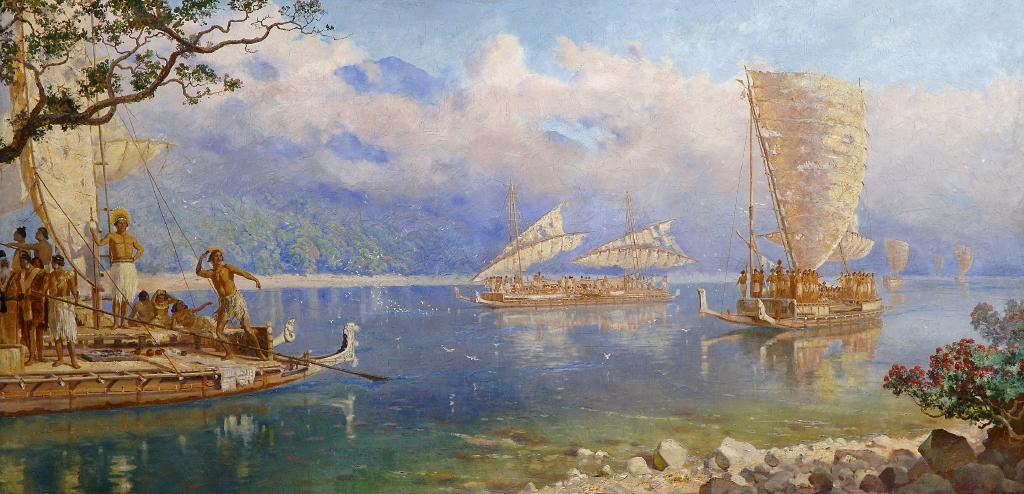
The Legend of the Voyage to New Zealand (1912)
