= Karl Sim =

New Zealand art forger

Karl Fedor (Note: According to journalist Ian Dougherty, A Good Joke: The Life and Crimes of Notorious New Zealand Art Forger Karl Sim (2019), Sim was named Karl after Karl Marx and Fedor after a friend of his father.) Sim, also known as Carl Fedor Goldie (6 December 1923 – 21 October 2013) was a New Zealand art forger, and the only person convicted of that crime in New Zealand.

== Early life ==
Sim was born in Mangaweka in the Manawatū-Whanganui region, and attended Oroua Downs School. His parents, Leo and May Sim, were of Scottish descent and were life-long communists.

Sim's artistic talents were discovered at Palmerston North Technical School, where from the age of 14 he learned under H. Linley Richardson. Richardson had him learn by copying other artists, including old masters and New Zealand painter Charles F Goldie. Sim later worked as a "well diviner," choosing the best places to dig a well, in Manawatu in the 1950s. He also used his artistic skills working as a signwriter.

== Forgery ==
Sim noticed his art from school being auctioned off as originals of other artists, and from then started forging on purpose. He would forge artists such as Frances Hodgkins, Colin McCahon, and Charles F. Goldie, He started selling forged paintings and drawings in his 40s, out of his antique and wine shop in Foxton. By selling the artwork through his shop, it created provenance, bolstering the claim of authenticity. By signing the artist's name on the pictures, he sold them as original, genuine pieces of art. He even managed to sell a van Dyck for around $600. Eventually the amount of art coming out of his shop raised suspicions, and the police raided it and arrested him in 1985. Sim had gotten caught with spelling mistakes in some signatures, specifically with van der Velden forgeries where he capitalized the v in van, as well as signing one painting "Veldon." He was convicted of 40 counts of forgery and sentenced to 200 hours community service and a fine of $1,000. Afterward he changed his name to Carl Fedor Goldie, so he could legally sign his work as C.F. Goldie. Following his conviction he continued to forge art, using associates to sell his forgeries through auction houses in New Zealand, Australia and the United Kingdom until shortly before his death. He was responsible for a set of six forged artworks attributed to Paul Gauguin displayed at an Auckland exhibition in 2000, although one auctioneer claimed his fakes were obvious and would not fool experts since he used the same techniques and pigments in his forgeries.

== Later life ==
Sim was a guest of honor at the inaugural Mangaweka Fakes & Forgeries Festival held in 2007 in his birth town. He appeared again as a prize presenter in 2011 at the now two yearly event, and was planned to appear at the 2013 event in November, before his death in October of that year. In 2007, he was named the 8th greatest art forger in the world.

He co-wrote an autobiography in 2003, called Good As Goldie: the amazing story of New Zealand’s most famous art forger (ISBN 9781869589073), which was later republished as C F Goldie and the Creative Art of Forgery (ISBN 1471745422).

He died on 21 October 2013 at North Shore Hospital, Auckland, New Zealand. A couple purchased his old flat and turned it into an antique shop named Goldie's Junk 'N Disorderly to keep his legacy alive.
