= Departure of the Six Canoes from Raratonga for New Zealand, AD1350 =

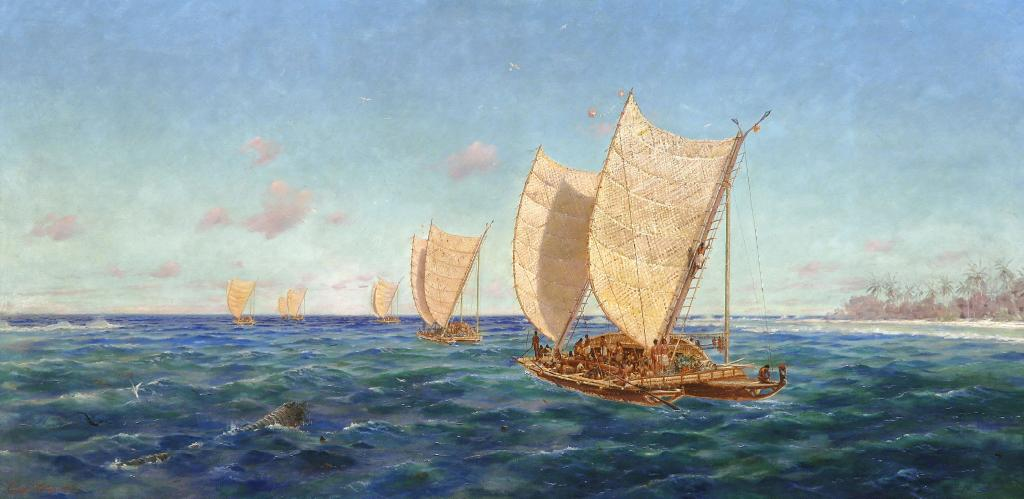
- Artist: Kennett Watkins
- Year: 1906
- Medium: Oil on canvas
- Dimensions: 1075 mm × 2140 mm (42.3 in × 84 in)
- Location: Auckland Art Gallery, Auckland

Departure of the Six Canoes from Raratonga for New Zealand, AD1350 is an oil painting by the New Zealand painter Kennett Watkins (1847–1933). Painted in 1906 and gifted to the Auckland Art Gallery two years later, it portrays the Māori seafaring canoes that left Rarotonga, in the Cook Islands, as part of the alleged 'Grand Fleet' sailing for New Zealand. The work was influential in supporting the now discredited theory that the settlement of Māori in New Zealand resulted from the arrival of the 'Grand Fleet' of migration canoes.

== Background ==
In the late 19th century, there was growing ethnographic interest in the origin of the Māori population in New Zealand, with the dominant theory being advanced by Stephenson Percy Smith, this being the existence of a 'Grand Fleet' of seven canoes that arrived in about 1350 from Rarotonga, in the Cook Islands. Smith argued that this Grand Fleet followed the supposed discovery of New Zealand by the Polynesian explorer Kupe, sailing from Hawaiki, the traditional supposed homeland of Polynesians, in about 750, and its rediscovery in the 9th century by Toi and Whatonga; the latter allegedly found the country was inhabited by the Moriori people, a primitive race of Polynesians, which were wiped out by those people of the Grand Fleet.

The perception in New Zealand in the late 1800s was that the Māori population was dying out as a result of contact with superior western civilisation. The concept of the 'Grand Fleet', which resulted in the demise of the Moriori, tied into this view and in the settlers' minds justified the colonisation of New Zealand by Europeans and the decline of the Māori people. It was against this backdrop that Sir George Grey, a former Premier of New Zealand who had an interest in the culture of indigenous peoples, urged artists to record aspects of the Māori people with a view to preserving them for posterity.

Kennett Watkins was an English artist, born in 1847, who had emigrated to New Zealand in 1874 and subsequently became the headmaster of the Auckland Free School of Arts. He executed historical paintings of landscapes and events, particularly those involving the Māori people, and by the 1880s had established a reputation for works of this nature and was a pioneer in the visual depiction of New Zealand history. Watkins was keenly interested in Smith's theory of a 'Grand Fleet', writing and lecturing on the topic and in 1906, he produced the oil painting Departure of the Six Canoes from Raratonga for New Zealand, AD1350.

== Description and execution ==
Departure was painted with oils on a canvas measuring 1075 mm by 2140 mm (42.3 in × 84 in) and depicts several twin-hulled canoes sailing away from Rarotonga (which Watkins spelt Raratonga in the title of the painting). A portion of the shore of Rarotonga is shown on the right side of the image, with the sea, of slight condition, stretching away across the middle and left to the horizon. The sky, which is bright with few clouds, takes up two thirds of the horizontal aspect of the canvas, but is disrupted by the large triangular sails of the canoes. The closest canoe is placed approximately right of centre and its crew is visible standing and looking away from the viewer to the horizon. A semi-submerged tree trunk is depicted in the left foreground.

Despite the full name of the painting, tradition in Rarotonga considers that the 'Grand Fleet' comprised seven, rather than six, canoes, identified as Mātaatua, Te Arawa, Tainui, Aotea, Kurahaupō, Tokomaru and Tākitimu, and departed from the island's Avana Passage. Some artistic licence was taken with the features of the depicted canoes and as early as the 1920s, it was recognised that certain details were inaccurate. For example, ethnographer Elsdon Best, writing in 1925, commented that rigging details were inconsistent with the time period of the canoe shown in the painting. In the defence of Watkins, at the time there was limited knowledge of the configuration and construction of the canoes in which Māori first arrived in New Zealand. It has also been conceded that contemporary artists depicting aspects of Māori culture often made similar errors of ethnology.

== Reception ==
When it was first exhibited, Departure was positively received; it was described as the "showiest of the oil paintings [on display]". The reviewer further commented that it was "bright and breezy".

In the years following its production, Departure, and Watkins' even larger and more ambitious work of 1912, The Legend of the Voyage to New Zealand, played a role in mythologising the arrival of Māori in New Zealand in a 'Grand Fleet', as postulated by Smith. However the hypothesis soon fell out of favour particularly given Smith's reasoning for an arrival date of 1350 was discovered to be flawed. He had also misrepresented the existence of Kupe, Toi and Whatonga, and there was no evidence of the presence of Moriori people in New Zealand prior to the arrival of Māori. By the 1960s, it was recognised that migration canoes travelling alone, or perhaps in pairs, from multiple points of origin were the most likely explanation for how Māori came to settle New Zealand.

Departure was subsequently gifted to the Auckland Art Gallery in 1908 by John Marshall. The painting has remained in the collection of the gallery since then and as of 2026, it is on display.
