= The Arrival of the Maoris in New Zealand =

Painting by Charles Goldie and Louis Steele

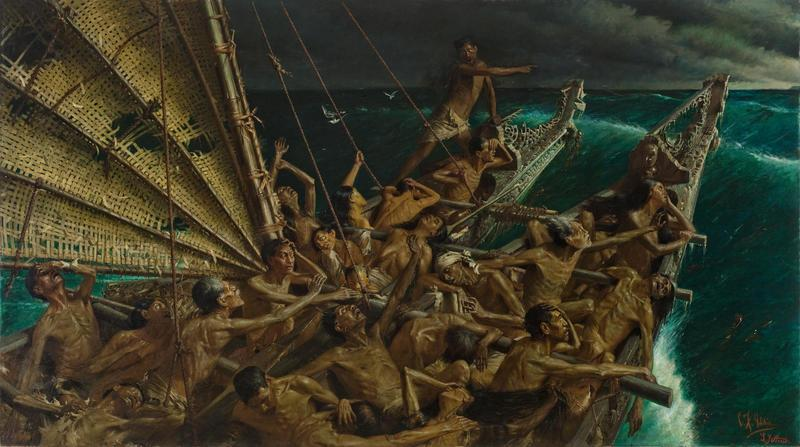
- Artist: Charles Goldie; Louis Steele
- Year: 1899
- Medium: Oil on canvas
- Dimensions: 1380 mm × 2450 mm (54 in × 96 in)
- Location: Auckland Art Gallery, Auckland

The Arrival of the Maoris in New Zealand is an oil painting by the New Zealand painters Charles Goldie (1870–1947) and Louis Steele (1842–1918). Painted in 1899 and bequeathed to the Auckland Art Gallery the same year, it portrays a seafaring canoe of starving Māori sighting New Zealand. Its composition is reminiscent of another painting, the 1819 French work The Raft of the Medusa. The Arrival of the Maoris in New Zealand helped shape the now archaic view that the settlement of New Zealand by Māori was accidental, rather than a deliberate and planned migration. It is considered to be one of New Zealand's most famous historical paintings.

== Background ==
In the late 19th century, there was growing ethnographic interest in the origin of the Māori population in New Zealand, with the dominant theory being advanced by Stephenson Percy Smith, this being the existence of a 'Grand Fleet' of seven canoes that arrived in about 1350 from Rarotonga, in the Cook Islands. Smith argued that this Grand Fleet followed the supposed discovery of New Zealand by the Polynesian explorer Kupe in about 750, and its rediscovery in the 9th century by Toi and Whatonga; the latter allegedly found the country was inhabited by the Moriori people, a primitive race of Polynesians, which were wiped out by those people of the Grand Fleet. However, many ethnographers of the time struggled with the notion that the Māori, an allegedly primitive race, possessed the necessary navigational skills to make a deliberate, planned voyage to New Zealand. Therefore, an alternative theory was that the Māori arrived purely by chance, due to being blown off course or becoming lost.

The perception in New Zealand in the late 1800s was that the Māori population was dying out as a result of contact with superior western civilisation. The concept of the 'Grand Fleet', which resulted in the demise of the Moriori, tied into this view and in the settlers' minds justified the colonisation of New Zealand by Europeans and the decline of the Māori people. It was against this backdrop that Sir George Grey, a former Premier of New Zealand who had an interest in the culture of indigenous peoples, urged artists to record aspects of the Māori people with a view to preserving them for posterity. Two who did so were Louis Steele and Charles Goldie, who combined to produce The Arrival of the Maoris in New Zealand in 1899.

Louis Steele, was an English-born artist who had trained in Paris. He emigrated to New Zealand in 1886 and established a studio at the Victoria Arcade in Auckland's Shortland Street. He executed historical paintings, including of events involving the Māori people. Charles Goldie, born in Auckland in 1870, showed prowess in art while still at school, winning awards from the Auckland Society of Arts and the New Zealand Art Students' Association. After his education was completed, he studied art under the tutelage of Steele for a time. Then, from 1893 to 1898, Goldie studied art in France including a period at the Académie Julian. During his time there, he made copies of paintings in the Louvre. On his return to Auckland in 1898, he reconnected with Steele, and the two of them set up an art academy at Shortland Street.

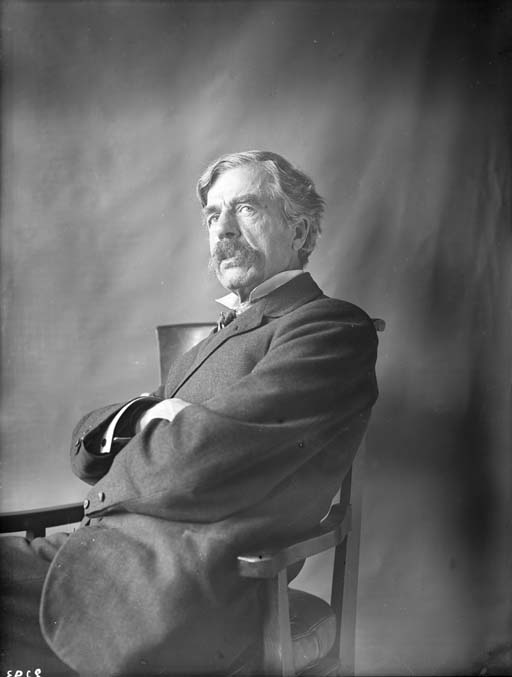
Louis Steele, in 1906

== Description ==
The Arrival of the Maoris in New Zealand was the pair's entry into a competition facilitated by the Auckland Society of Arts. A benefactor, Helen Boyd, had left the society with a bequest of £200 to be used for the purchase of a painting of a New Zealand subject, by a local artist. The trustees of the society would select the winning painting which was to then be presented to the Auckland Art Gallery.

Painted with oils on a canvas measuring 1380 mm by 2450 mm (54 in by 96 in), The Arrival of the Maoris in New Zealand depicts a battered, twin-hulled canoe with Māori men and women at the time of sighting the coast of New Zealand. The canoe is in the left centre foreground, with its prow extending to the top right, where the newly sighted landmass is visible. Filling out the left side of the image is the canoe's tattered sail. A centrally positioned and elevated figure is pointing towards land while looking back towards the crew, who are arranged along the respective hulls of the canoe. The crew themselves are shown to be in an emaciated, desperate state and in disbelief of their potential salvation. The sky and sea is shown in a somewhat dark and stormy condition.

Goldie and Steele's work is reminiscent of the 1819 painting by Theodore Géricault, The Raft of the Medusa, which portrayed the survivors of the shipwrecked Medusa on a raft sighting a rescue ship in the distance after several days with no food. Both artists were familiar with Géricault's painting due to their time spent in Paris where it was displayed. Goldie had even made a copy of the work the year before his return to New Zealand.

The composition of The Arrival of the Maoris in New Zealand is similar to the Géricault painting; the portion of the canoe visible to the viewer is arranged diagonally across the canvas, with a central, elevated figure pointing to the horizon, in much the same way as the raft in the earlier work. The connection to Géricault's painting was not known at the time The Arrival of the Maoris in New Zealand was made; it was not until 1942 that an art historian, Gerda Eichbaum, first made the comparison in an article for the Art in New Zealand Journal. Much weight has since been placed on the similarity between the two paintings such that the later work is often viewed simply as a reworking of the earlier but with a New Zealand theme. However, in the view of Eichbaum and Jane Davidson-Ladd, the latter the author of a thesis on Steele, this is an oversimplification. There remain significant differences, in relative proportions and characterisations of certain features of Goldie and Steele's work. In particular, the sea plays a greater role in the painting and the vessel is only shown in part. The work is also more realistic in style compared to the classical nature of The Raft of the Medusa, and the viewer is in closer proximity to the subject.

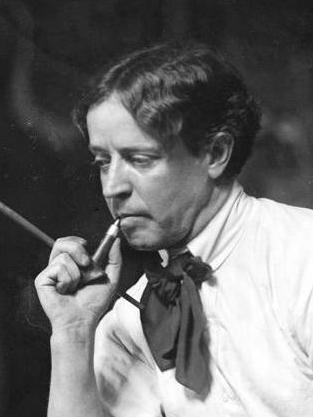
Charles Goldie, in the period 1910–1920

== Execution ==
The respective contributions of Goldie and Steele to The Arrival of the Maoris in New Zealand is not known with certainty. Allegedly Goldie did much of the actual work, with Steele serving as a model for many of the males shown in the painting. This view is supported by the recollections of Goldie's wife and a student at the pair's academy. However, as Steele was the older painter, this appears to be unlikely. An art historian, Leonard Bell, has argued it is more likely that Steele did the figures while Goldie was responsible for the sea and sky. The latter may have also been responsible for the canoe. This interpretation of the division of labours is supported by Davidson-Ladd, who notes similarity in the treatment of the figures of the painting to those of other works by Steele.

Considerable artistic licence was taken with the subject; the canoe was of a configuration of the 18th century, the figures themselves are shown as Polynesians, lacking traditional Māori tattoos, and the figure is shown to be pointing to land, which is a gesture that is actually taboo in Māori culture. As early as the 1920s, it was recognised that certain details were inaccurate. For example, ethnographer Elsdon Best, writing in 1925, commented on the "dubious features" of the canoe shown in the painting. In the defence of Goldie and Steele, at the time there was limited knowledge of the configuration and construction of the canoes in which Māori first arrived in New Zealand. It has also been conceded that contemporary artists depicting aspects of Māori culture often made similar errors of ethnology.

== Exhibition and reception ==
When it was first exhibited, at Goldie and Steele's academy in October 1899, and then at the Auckland Society of Arts, the reception of the general public to the work was immediate and positive; one reviewer described it as "exceedingly fine, and the picture is in every respect a powerful and artistic one". The art historian Leonard Bell notes that in 1899 the majority of the settlers of New Zealand had either made the journey to the country by an often hazardous voyage by ship themselves, or were immediate descendants of those who did. They likely identified with the perilous conditions shown in the work.

Among Māori viewers, Steele and Goldie's work was less well received. It exemplified the theory that the Māori discovery of New Zealand was simply a happenstance; as such it challenged the traditional view of a deliberate, organised exploratory voyage by skilled Māori navigators. Oral tradition among Māori made no mention of the dramatic and desperate circumstances shown in the painting. The presentation of the arrival of New Zealand by Māori as accidental and by chance was considered to be a fictional creation.

The painting was duly selected as the winner of the competition and acquired for the Auckland Art Gallery in December. It was exhibited in Christchurch in 1900 and even went abroad in 1904, where it was displayed at the Louisiana Purchase Exposition in St. Louis, alongside paintings by Gottfried Lindauer. By this time Goldie and Steele had long ended their partnership. The Arrival of the Maoris in New Zealand was the basis of Goldie's future reputation in Maori portraiture. Steele came to resent Goldie's growing profile and never collaborated with him again, and the pair closed their academy. Goldie subsequently set up his own studio on Shortland Street.

== Legacy ==
The Arrival of the Maoris in New Zealand is considered to be one of New Zealand's most famous historical paintings. For a time, it represented the definitive historical basis of how Māori arrived in New Zealand, through the extent of its reproduction in other media and by being used to illustrate non-fiction works. For example, in 1902, it was reproduced in James Drummond's Nature in New Zealand, with the accompanying text referring to "the condition of the Maoris when they first sighted New Zealand". Writing a history book for children in 1924, H. J. Constable described it as a literal depiction of the arrival of the Māori people in New Zealand. Similarly, in 1936, it was published in the National Geographic in the same, documentary context. That it came to be seen as part of the historical narrative was reinforced by a subtle change in its title. When first exhibited, it was titled Arrival of the Maoris in New Zealand; over time it has acquired the definitive article in its title.

In some instances the painting has been used to depict specific ancestral canoes; for example, the canoe has been identified as showing the Tainui canoe of 1350 although Goldie's biographer, Roger Blackley, argued for a more generic depiction. In contrast, Davidson-Ladd argues that Goldie and Steele may have been depicting a myth associated with the Arawa canoe. Supposedly, the captain of that canoe kidnapped a tohunga (priest) called Ngatoro to act as his navigator. Ngatoro, whose wife had also been taken hostage, had planned to be on another canoe. On discovering his wife being threatened by the Arawa captain, Ngatoro used his powers to bring down a storm upon the canoe, damaging and forcing its prow into a whirlpool, and causing the loss of the provisions being carried. On hearing the fearful cries of the crew, he ceased his magic and released the canoe from the storm. Goldie and Steele may have been aware of this myth, since it was among many collected and published by Sir George Grey in his 1885 book Polynesian Mythology. This may explain the depiction of the damaged and seaweed covered appearance of the prow of the canoe in The Arrival of the Maoris in New Zealand. Grey was known to both men, having visited Steele at his studio and being acquainted with Goldie's father.

Since the 1930s onwards, the perception of the painting has changed and there was increasing awareness of its romanticised and fictionalised nature. Lecturing in 1936, historian Fanny Irvine-Smith argued that it gave a "wrong impression...of the arrival of the Maoris in New Zealand". Other commentators also stated that the painting represented a misconception of the settlement of New Zealand and was a product of its time. Furthermore, the concept of the 'Grand Fleet', as advanced by Percy Smith, had fallen out of favour particularly given his reasoning for an arrival date of 1350 was discovered to be flawed. Percy Smith had also misrepresented the existence of Kupe, Toi and Whatonga, and there was no evidence of the presence of Moriori people in New Zealand prior to the arrival of Māori. By the 1960s, it was recognised that migration canoes travelling alone, or perhaps in pairs, from multiple points of origin were the most likely explanation for how Māori came to settle New Zealand.

The Arrival of the Maoris in New Zealand has remained in the collection of the Auckland Art Gallery since its acquisition. In 1985, it was discovered to have been damaged with a finger-sized hole in the canvas. At the time, the painting was valued at $100,000. In 2016 it was recreated as a photograph by the Samoan New Zealander Greg Semu, who made the image in Rarotonga, from where some of the Māori ancestral canoes departed for New Zealand, with locals depicting the crew of the canoe. As of 2025, it is not being displayed.

== See also ==
- The Legend of the Voyage to New Zealand
