= C. F. Goldie =

New Zealand artist (1870–1947)

Charles Frederick Goldie OBE
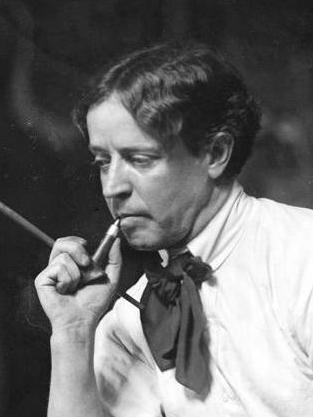
- Goldie, c. 1905
- Born: 20 October 1870; Auckland, New Zealand
- Died: 11 July 1947 (aged 76); Auckland, New Zealand
- Known for: Paintings of Māori dignitaries

Charles Frederick Goldie OBE (20 October 1870 – 11 July 1947) was a New Zealand artist, best known for his portrayal of Māori elders.

== Early life ==
Goldie was born in Auckland on 20 October 1870. He was named after his maternal grandfather, Charles Frederick Partington, who built the landmark Auckland windmill. His father, David Goldie, was a prominent timber merchant and politician, and a strict Primitive Methodist who resigned as Mayor of Auckland rather than toast the visiting Duke and Duchess of Cornwall and York with alcohol. His mother, Maria Partington, was an amateur artist and encouraged his artistic ability. Goldie was educated at Auckland Grammar School, and while still at school won several prizes from the Auckland Society of Arts and the New Zealand Art Students' Association.

== Art education ==
Goldie studied art part-time under Louis John Steele, after leaving school to work in his father's business. A former Governor of New Zealand, Sir George Grey, was impressed by two of Goldie's still-life paintings that were being exhibited at the Auckland Academy of Art (Steele's art society, of which Goldie was honorary secretary) in 1891, and he talked David Goldie into permitting his son to undertake further art training abroad.

Goldie went to Paris to study at the famous Académie Julian, where Goldie received a strong grounding in drawing and painting.

== Artistic career ==
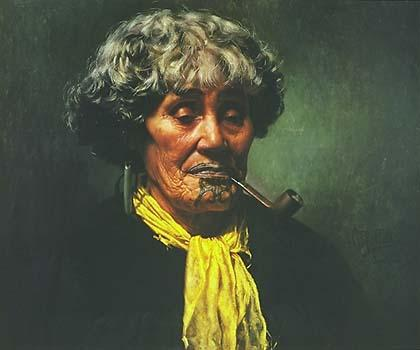
An oil portrait of Ina Te Papatahi by Goldie (1902)

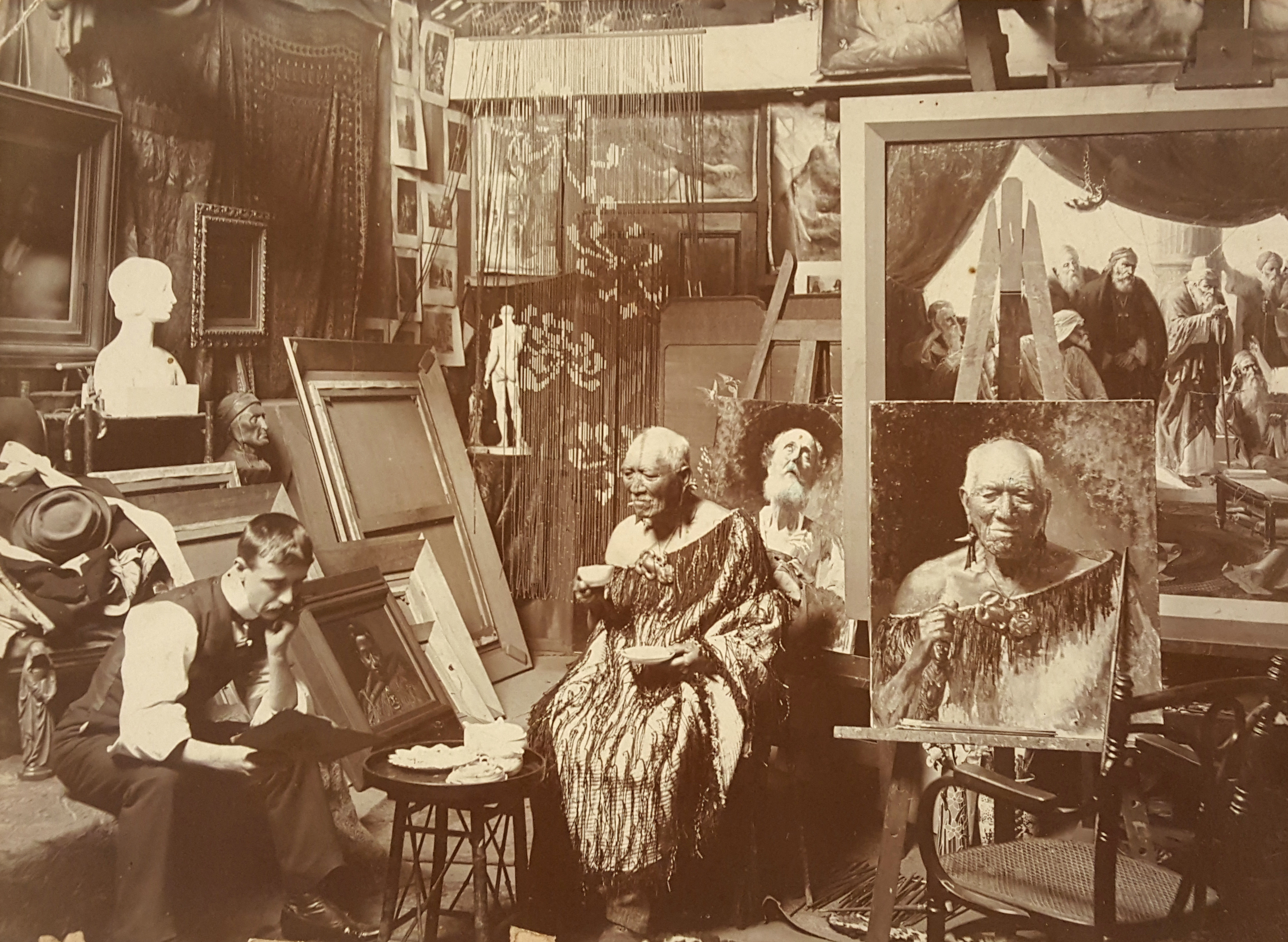
Goldie in his studio with Pātara Te Tuhi (c. 1905–1910)

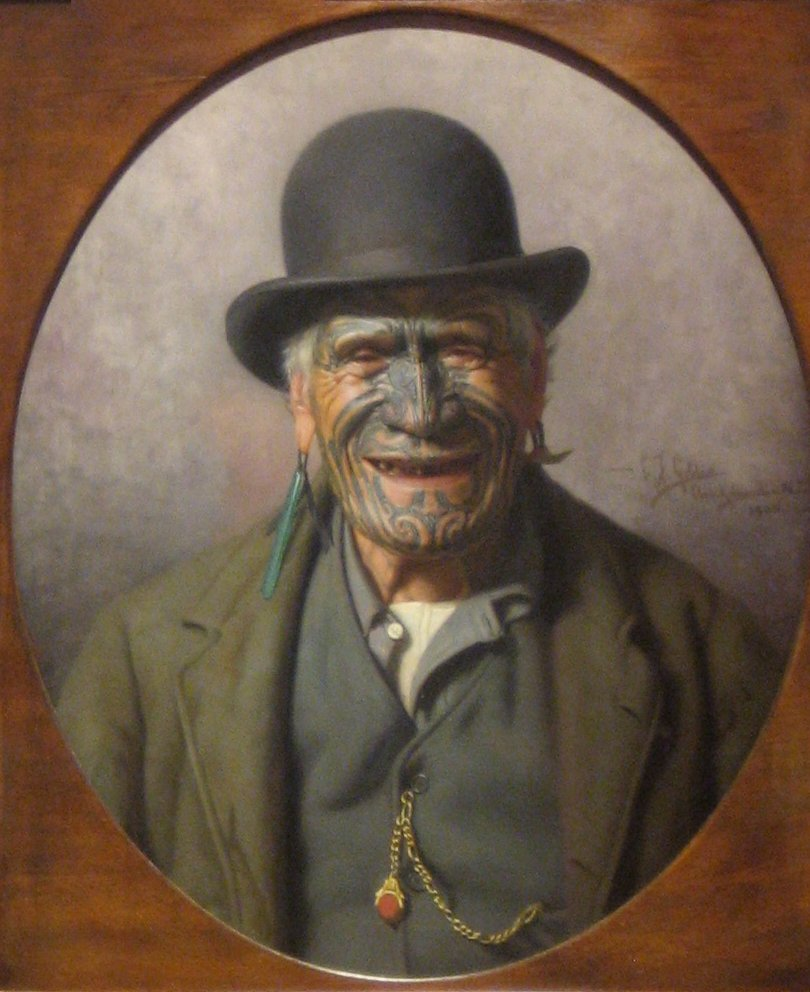
Te Aho-o-te-Rangi Wharepu of Ngati Mahuta (1905)

He returned to New Zealand in 1898 and established the "French Academy of Art" with Louis J. Steele, who had been his tutor prior to his departure. They shared a studio and collaborated on the large painting The Arrival of the Maoris in New Zealand, based on Théodore Géricault's The Raft of the Medusa. It depicted exhausted, starved and storm-tossed Polynesian mariners sighting land after a long journey by catamaran. Its representation of a starving crew and fanciful canoe was disdained by contemporary Māori. However, its artistic merits were praised at the time and is said to have launched Goldie's career.

Goldie and Steele parted ways not long afterwards and Goldie established his own studio, Steele apparently resenting the attention accorded to his former pupil. From 1901 he made field trips to meet, sketch and photograph Māori people in their own locations, and he also paid Māori visitors to Auckland to sit for him. Most of these were chiefs visiting the Native Land Court.

Goldie trod a path established by Steele's Māori history paintings and portraits of tattooed chiefs. Also influential was his brother William, who in 1901 wrote an article that contradicted predictions of the demise of the Māori and later the journalist and historian James Cowan.

By far the majority of Goldie's subjects were elderly, tattooed Māori of considerable standing in their own society. (The practice of tattooing (Tā moko) was not current at the time due to the influence of colonization, and the remaining examples were mostly elderly; it had also been a practice largely confined to high-status individuals.)

Goldie dedicated his life to painting the Māori chiefs, Māori leaders and their communities who also became his friends. He lived with them on their various marae and spoke fluent Te Reo Māori. He wanted to preserve the heritage of the Māori people, whom he admired. Some critics saw the fine detail in his paintings as evidence that he painted from photographs, which he did not.

On 31 October 1920 Goldie travelled to Sydney, where on 18 November at the age of 50 he married 35-year-old Olive Ethelwyn Cooper, an Australian by birth but a resident of Auckland. They did not have any children.

Goldie's health eventually deteriorated through lead poisoning (from the lead white used to prepare his canvases). In order to create the finest of detail in his paintings, he would lick the end of his paint brush to ensure an even finer tip. This was a relatively common practice at that time. He produced little work in the 1920s. Encouraged by the Governor-General, Lord Bledisloe, Goldie resumed painting around 1930; in 1934 and 1935 he exhibited at the Royal Academy of Arts in London, and in 1935, 1938 and 1939; the Salon of the Société des artistes français.

He stopped painting in 1941 and died on 11 July 1947 aged 76. He was buried at Purewa Cemetery in the Auckland suburb of Meadowbank.

=== Known sitters ===
Goldie was Auckland based and his subjects were mainly those from the tribes in the upper North Island.

- Wiripine Ninia of Ngati Awa
- Te Aho-o-te-rangi Wharepu of Ngati Mahuta
- Ina Te Papatahi (also known as Ena) of Ngā Puhi
- Harata Rewiri Tarapata of Ngā Puhi
- Kamariera Te Hau Takiri Wharepapa of Ngā Puhi
- Wharekauri Tahuna of Ngāti Manawa
- Hori Pokai of Ngati Maru

=== Honours ===
In 1935, Goldie was awarded the King George V Silver Jubilee Medal. Soon after, he was appointed an Officer of the Order of the British Empire, for services to art in New Zealand, in the 1935 King's Birthday and Silver Jubilee Honours.

== Legacy ==
Goldie's work is associated with the contemporary belief that the Māori were a "dying race". Many Māori value his images of their ancestors highly. On the rare occasions they are offered for sale they fetch high prices, among the highest for New Zealand paintings. Goldie is considered among the most important New Zealand artists, and the prices fetched reflect this view. The 1941 oil portrait of Wharekauri Tahuna was the first painting in New Zealand history to break the $1 million mark, reaching a top price of $1.175 million. In March 2008, NZ$400,000 (NZ$454,000 including buyer's premium) was paid at an International Art Centre auction in Auckland for the painting Hori Pokai - "Sleep, 'tis a gentle thing". Earlier, NZ$530,000 ($589,625 including buyer's premium) was achieved for a Goldie work in an online auction conducted by Fisher Galleries. On 19 November 2010 opera diva Dame Kiri Te Kanawa sold the oil on canvas "Forty Winks", a portrait of Rutene Te Uamairangi, for NZ$573,000. This was the most paid for a painting at auction in New Zealand at the time, but was later surpassed by Goldie's portrait of Ngāti Manawa chief Wharekauri Tahuna, entitled "A Noble Relic of a Noble Race" (sold in 2016 for NZ$1,300,000), his portrait of Hori Pokai, "A Sturdy Stubborn Chief" (sold for NZ$1,700,000 on 16 November 2016), and finally his portrait of chief Kamariera Te Hau Takiri Wharepapa, which sold at auction on 5 April 2022 for NZ$1,800,000.

Many Goldies are held in public collections, including those at the Auckland Art Gallery, the Auckland Institute and Museum, the Christchurch Art Gallery, and the Museum of New Zealand Te Papa Tongarewa. Some descendants of Māori represented in Goldie's paintings object to them being sold as prints. In 2022, a group of descendants of chief Kamariera Te Hau Takiri Wharepapa unsuccessfully attempted to raise the funds necessary to buy the painting at auction.

In March 2024, six paintings by Goldie were sold at auction in Auckland from the collection of Mainfreight co-founder Neil Graham. The collection sold for a total of NZ$4,550,000, and included a portrait of Waikato warrior Te Aho-o-te-Rangi Wharepu which sold for NZ$1,700,000.

=== Forgeries by Karl Sim ===
The convicted art forger Karl Sim changed his name legally to Carl Fedor Goldie in the 1980s in order to be able to "legitimately" sign his Goldie copies "C. F. Goldie". He published an autobiography with Tim Wilson in 2003 called Good as Goldie: the amazing story of New Zealand’s most famous art forger.
