= Louis John Steele =

New Zealand artist and engraver (1842–1918)

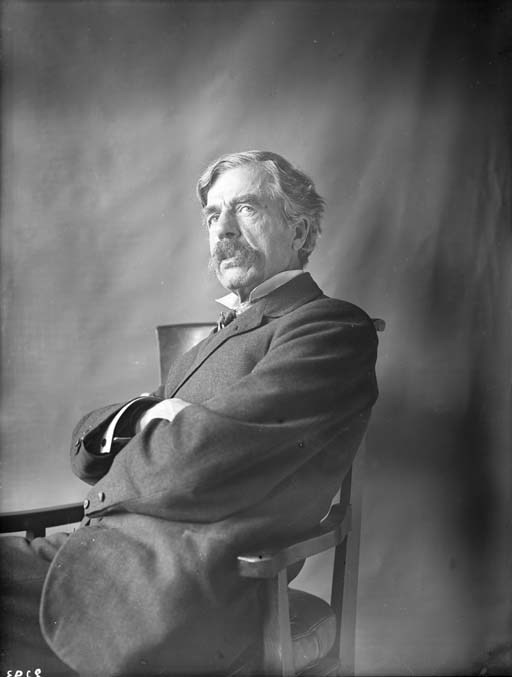
Steele in 1906

Louis John Steele (30 January 1842 – 12 December 1918) was an English-born New Zealand artist and engraver. He was born in Reigate, Surrey.

== Biography ==
Steele's parents were the surgeon John Sisson Steele and Harriet (née Thompson). Steele studied at the École nationale supérieure des Beaux-Arts in Paris before journeying to Florence. Steele returned to Paris some time before 1870, and was living in the city during the Franco-Prussian War and the time of the Paris Commune. He returned to Britain shortly afterwards, and exhibited paintings at the Royal Academy of Arts in 1872 and 1875. From 1881 to 1886, Steele showed etchings at the academy.

Steele married Marie Louise Alexandrine Piatti some time before 1871. They had two sons, Ernest Henri and Louis John Sisson Piatti (born August 1871).

== New Zealand career ==
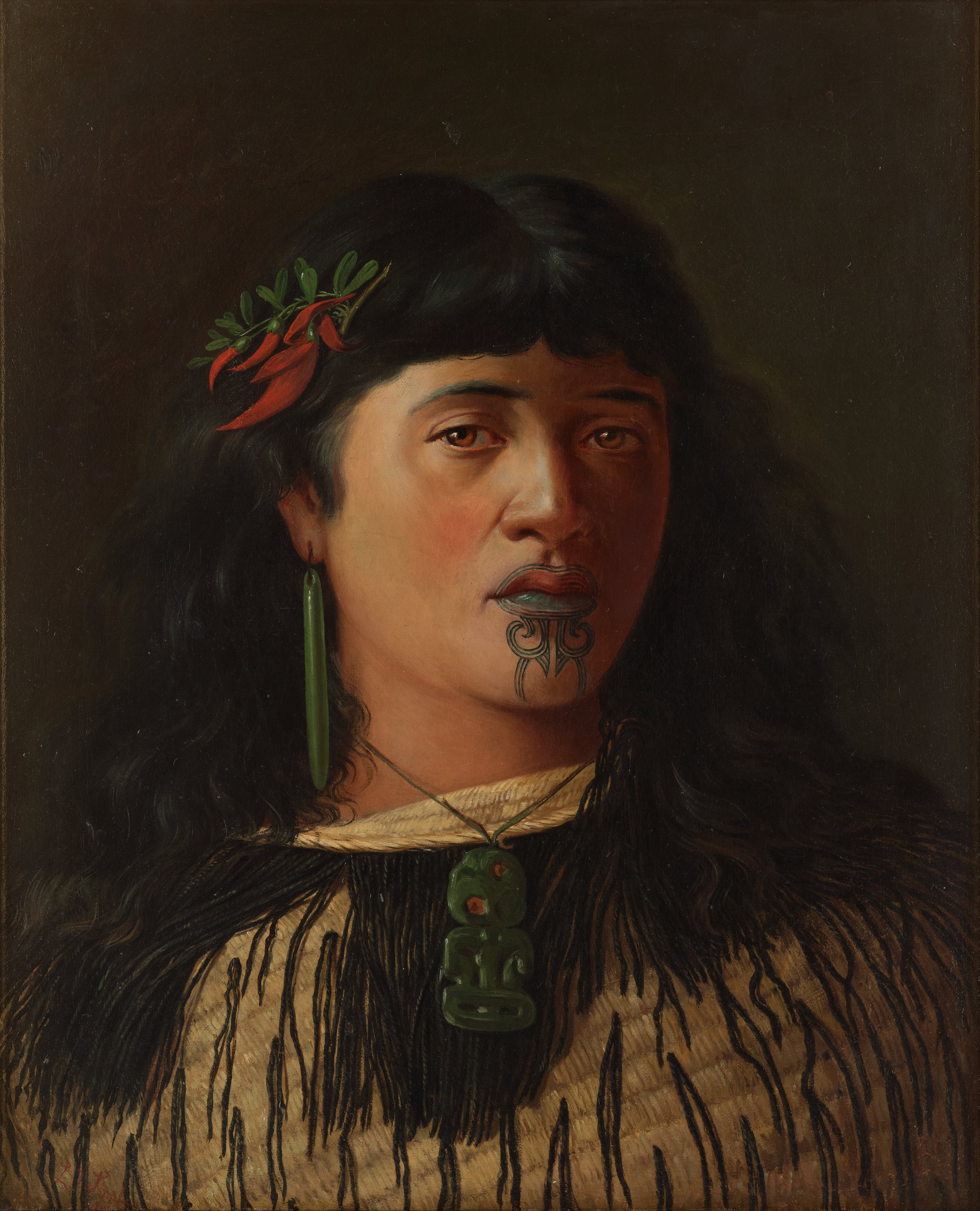
Steele's "Portrait of a young Maori woman with moko" (1891)

Steele emigrated to New Zealand in around 1886, settling in Auckland; Marie Louise did not accompany him. He opened a studio in an arcade on Shortland Street. One of his early pupils was Charles Frederick Goldie, the most significant painter of Māori subjects. In New Zealand, Steele painted portraits, racehorses, and scenes from history. Some of his history paintings were on a large scale, produced in collaboration with other artists.

In 1898 he and Goldie collaborated on The Arrival of the Maoris in New Zealand, now considered the best-known history painting to be completed in New Zealand; it was based directly on Théodore Géricault's famous Raft of the Medusa.

The contents of Steele's studio were auctioned on 16 August 1917; he died in Auckland on 12 December 1918.

His large oil painting of an elderly Sir John Logan Campbell at his house Kilbryde (now the site of the Parnell Rose Gardens) was thought lost for 100 years, but resurfaced in 2017; it fetched a record NZ$505,000.
