= Te Hūhū =

Māori chief

Te Hūhū, also known as Whārō, was a Māori rangatira (chief) of Te Rarawa.

== Biography ==
Primarily of Te Rarawa, Te Hūhū was also affiliated with Ngāti Hao, Ngāti Miru, and Ngāti Pou.

Little is known of his early life. His father was Kahi and his mother was Kaimanui, and he had multiple siblings, including two younger brothers, Pāpāhia and Whakarongouru, and three sisters, Tiari, Te Wairoro, and Ngākahuwhero. Additionally, Te Hūhū was the grandson of Tarutaru, and his wife, Te Ruapounamu, the ancestors of Te Rarawa. He was related to Nōpera Panakareao and through his uncle, Ngāmotu, he was related to Haare Nepia Te Morenga. Te Hūhū's daughter, Ati, later known as Ereonora, was one of the few women to sign the Treaty of Waitangi. Te Hūhū also had a son named Peri, who was responsible for the establishment of the hapū Te Uri o Tai.

After Kahi's death, Te Hūhū was bestowed with his father's mana, and was given the role of rangatira kaitiaki of Whangapē. He also inherited the name Whārō, which was derived from the beach at Ahipara, where the tide 'whārō ki uta, whārō ki tai' (stretched out to the land and sea). This comes in spite of the fact that Te Hūhū's principal residence was at Pawarenga, on the southern side of the Whangapē Harbour.

He signed He Whakaputanga sometime between 28 October 1835 and 13 January 1836. Te Hūhū, alongside Pāpāhia, Panakareao, and Haare Nepia Te Morenga, were the four principal Te Rarawa signatories who are known to have signed He Whakaputanga.

It is likely that Te Hūhū signed the Treaty of Waitangi under the name 'Matiu Hūhū' at Kaitaia on 28 April 1840. He is noted as having expressed his concerns before signing the treaty, particularly about the missionaries and the sale of Māori land to Pākehā. Te Hūhū did not agree to give land to the missionaries.

Governor George Grey awarded two portraits to Te Hūhū and fellow rangatira Reihana Kiriwi for their actions in preventing hostilities between Tamaho of Whangapē and 'the Patu'.

Te Hūhū died of natural causes at Waimako, Ōrongotea. Upon this, his brother, Pāpāhia, composed a mōteatea in his honour, a lament named He tangi mō Te Huhu.
