= Samuel Yates (storekeeper) =

- Born: 1829; London, England
- Died: 14 September 1900 (aged 71/72); Parengarenga Harbour, New Zealand
- Other name: King of the North
- Occupations: Storekeeper; Farmer; Businessman
- Spouse: Ngāwini Yates

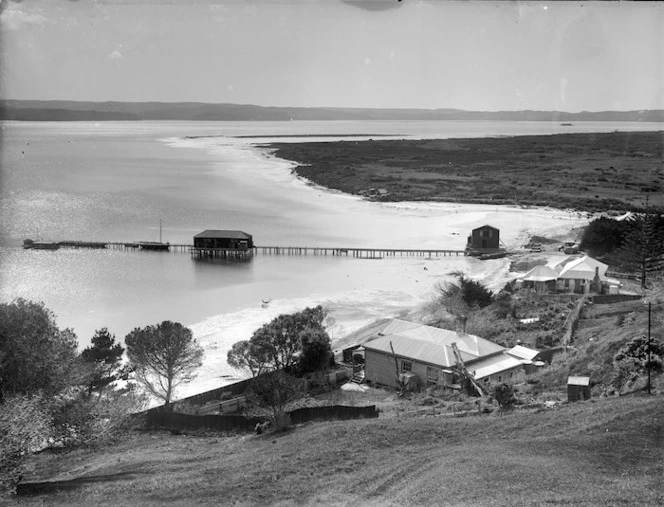
Yates' house and store at Pārengarenga Harbour, 1910

Samuel Yates (1829 – 14 September 1900) was an English-born New Zealander, who was a storekeeper, farmer and businessman in the far north of New Zealand in the latter part of the 19th century. His land holdings were so extensive, he was known as the "King of the North".

== Early life ==
Samuel Yates was born in London, England in 1829 to Saul Yates, a Jewish solicitor, and his wife, Sarah Isaacs. Yates was educated in Liverpool, where his paternal grandfather had been the minister of the first Jewish congregation there, and also Paris. In his later years, he alleged that he met Emperor Louis Napoleon during his time in Paris and acquired his autograph.

== Commercial activity ==
Yates came to New Zealand, where he had family, in 1852 with his father. Expected to pursue a legal career he instead opened a store at Mangōnui, on the Northland Peninsula. In the early 1860s, he moved further north, to Pārengarenga Harbour. Originally envisaging a short stay for a holiday, the area was to his liking and he opened a second store there. He became a prominent resident, building a large homestead at Paua, on the southern side of Pārengarenga Harbour. He was the only trader in the area for a number of years and was apparently well respected. He had a monopoly on the kauri gum trade up until the late 1870s when a competitor set up at Te Kao.

In December 1880, Yates married Ngāwini Murray, also known as Annie; his wife was part-Māori, was from Pukepoto, near Kaitaia, and was well connected to the Te Rarawa and Te Aupōuri iwi (tribe) through her mother, Kateraina Te Kone. It was a fortuitous marriage; through his wife's relationships with her iwi, Yates purchased or leased a significant amount of land across the northern part of the Aupōuri Peninsula. His holdings eventually ran from Te Kao to North Cape and across to the coast on the western side of the peninsula. This area, a total of about 150,000 acres, became known as Te Paki station. He was able to finance his acquisitions through his connections to the finance sector in Auckland.

Much of the acquired land was converted to pasture, on which livestock, in the form of cattle, sheep and horses, was stocked. Cottages for farmer workers were erected, along with other sheds and structures. A jetty was built to allow goods and livestock to be loaded onto ships for transportation south to Auckland. His business interests and the size of his property were such that he became known as the "King of the North".

== Later life ==
As Yates aged, he left more of the running of Te Paki to his wife, who was several years his junior. By September 1900, his health was in decline and he decided to leave Pārengarenga for Auckland so that when he died, he could be interred in the Jewish section of the Symonds Street Cemetery. Sailing aboard the Paeroa, he died on 14 September 1900; the ship had only just departed Pārengarenga. He was survived by his wife, who oversaw his burial in Auckland, and the couple's eight children. Ngāwini Yates continued to run Te Paki station until her own death in 1910.
