= Ngāwini Yates =

New Zealand businesswoman (died 1910)

- Born: Ngāwini Murray; 1852/1853; Pukepoto, New Zealand
- Died: 29 July 1910 (aged 57/58); Pārengarenga, New Zealand
- Other name: Annie
- Occupations: Storekeeper; Farmer; Businesswoman
- Spouse: Samuel Yates

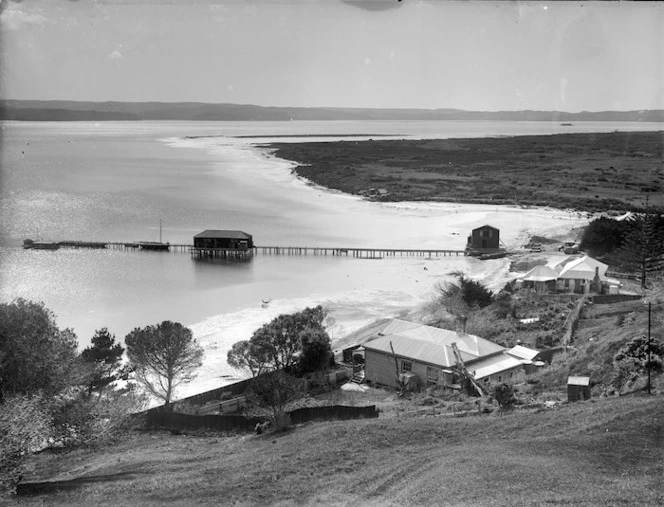
Ngāwini Yates' house and store at Pārengarenga Harbour, 1910

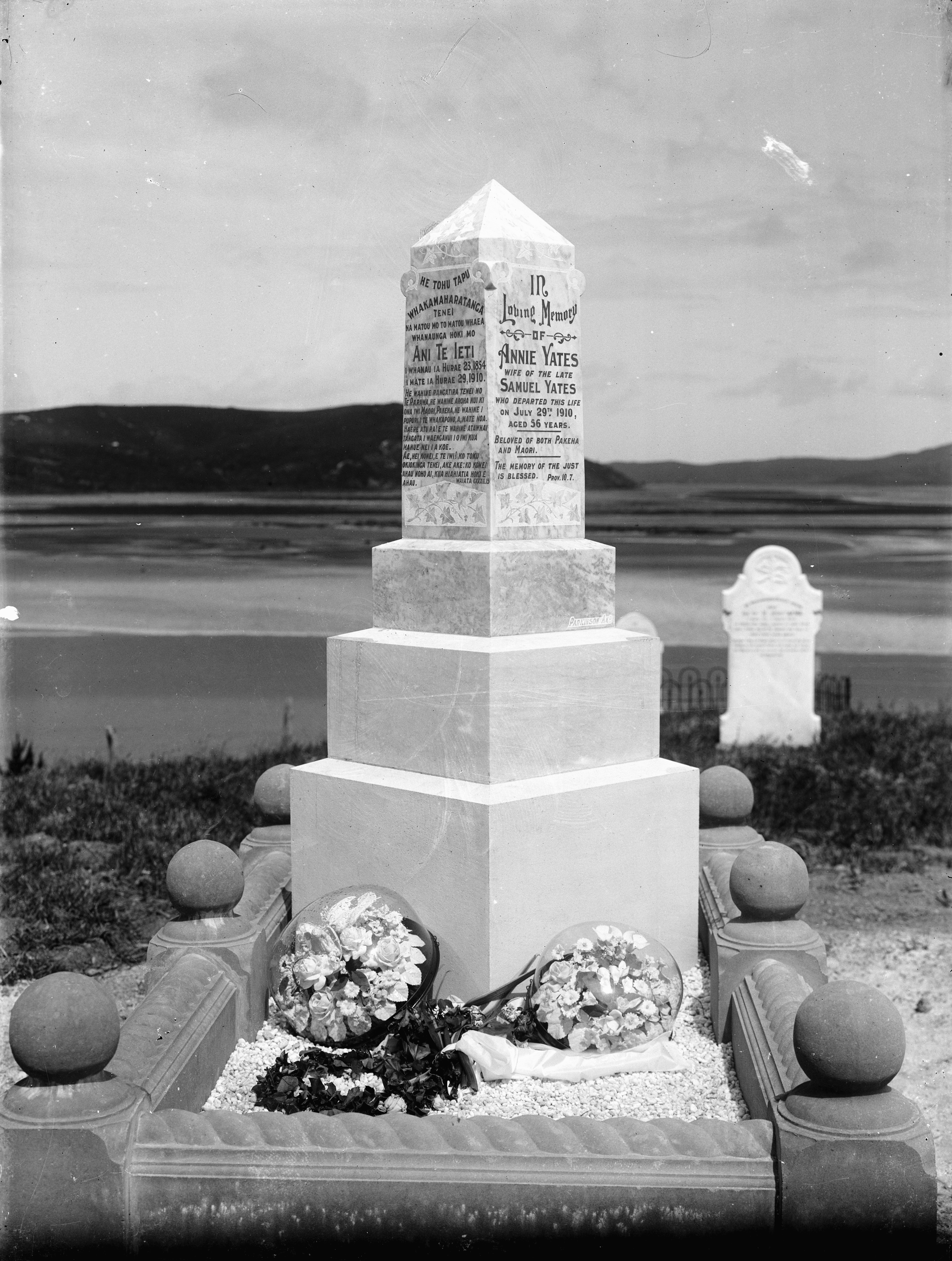
The gravestone of Ngāwini Yates, at Pārengarenga Harbour

Ngāwini Yates (1852 or 1853 – 19 July 1910) was a part-Māori New Zealander, who was a storekeeper, farmer and businesswoman in the far north of New Zealand in the later part of the 19th century.

== Early life ==
Ngāwini Yates, also known as Annie, was born Ngāwini Murray around 1852 or 1853 at Pukepoto, near Kaitaia, in the far north of New Zealand. She was the oldest of 15 children born to John Murray, a shipwright who had settled at Pukepoto having immigrated from Europe. Her mother, Kateraina Te Kone, was a Māori of the Te Rarawa iwi (tribe) who also had connections to the Te Aupōuri iwi.

== Commercial activity ==
In December 1880, at Mangonui, she married Samuel Yates, a storekeeper who had his premises in the town and a store at Pārengarenga Harbour, close to North Cape. The couple purchased or leased a significant amount of land across the northern part of the Aupouri Peninsula, a total of about 150,000 acres. It is possible that this was achieved on the back of Ngāwini Yates' relationships with her iwi. On this land, much of which the couple converted to pasture, livestock, in the form of cattle, sheep and horses, was stocked. Cottages for their farmer workers were erected, along with other sheds and structures. A jetty was built to allow goods and livestock to be loaded onto ships for transportation south to Auckland.

A trading store and homestead was built at Pāua, on the southern coastline of the Pārengarenga Harbour. Here the couple had eight children, which she primarily raised and educated. The Yates also played a role in the Kauri gum industry; at its peak, over 300 gum diggers were working on the property extracted from their land and traded in their store.

Ngāwini Yates was heavily involved in the running of the vast Yates property, which employed local Māori as shearers and musterers, and her influence increased as her husband, over 20 years her senior, aged. A skilled horse rider, she often helped in the mustering of livestock. She even developed a distinct breed of cattle. Samuel Yates, his health in decline, died on 14 September 1900, at the start of a journey by ship to Auckland. She oversaw his interment in the Jewish section of the Symonds Street Cemetery in Auckland.

== Later life ==
Despite the death of her husband, Yates stayed on at their house in Pāua and continued to successfully run the property as well as the store. Under her charge, the size of the Yates sheep herd was increased until it exceeded 5,000 head. She died there on 29 July 1910 and was buried at Pārengarenga. The portion of the property that was leased was restored to its Te Aupōuri owners while the remainder, about 68,000 acres, was sold.
