= Pāpāhia =

Māori chief (died c. 1850s)

Pāpāhia (died c. 1850s), also known as Te Tai or Te Ataoterangi, was a Māori rangatira (chief) affiliated with the iwi Te Rarawa, and its hapū, Te Horokuhare and Ngāti Hauā. He lived at Ōrongotea, Hokianga.

== Biography ==
The son of Kahi and Kaimanu, Pāpāhia was one of at least six children. He had an older brother, Te Hūhū, and a younger brother called Whakarongouru. Pāpāhia also had three sisters, Tiari, Te Wairoro, and Ngākahuwhero, who is considered to be a founding mother of Te Rarawa. Pāpāhia was also related to Haare Nepia Te Morenga through his uncle Ngāmotu, and was an uncle of Ngāti Korokoro rangatira, Moetara, as well as Ereonora, one of the few women to sign the Treaty of Waitangi. Pāpāhia later married Te Koiuru, with whom he had a child, Wiremu Tana, who would later have a daughter, Miriama, and a son, Hone Tana.

Pāpāhia was highly involved in combat throughout the 1820s and 1830s, having joined various taua. In 1833, he participated in Ngāpuhi rangatira Tītore’s taua, with Henry Williams describing Pāpāhia as one of Tītore's 'General Officers'.

It is probable that he was present at Waitangi when the flag of the United Tribes of New Zealand was chosen in 1834. In January 1838, he was baptised by Bishop Pompallier. On 24 September of the same year, he signed He Whakaputanga in support of his Te Rarawa kin. He was the last to sign the declaration in Te Tai Tokerau, given that he was absent from the hui of 28 October 1835.

Pāpāhia originally opposed the Treaty of Waitangi, however, some time in 1840, Pāpāhia signed the treaty, most likely in the Bay of Islands. His son, Wiremu Tana, and his nephews, Ngāniho Te Tai and Te Hira, probably signed at the same time. According to a man named William Stones, Pāpāhia and his son signed the treaty on 6 February at Mission House, Māngungu. In May 1840, he was present at the Ōpōtiki signing, and was recorded as a witness on the Bay of Plenty (Fedarb) sheet. Pāpāhia, alongside Te Hūhū, Panakareao, and Haare Nepia Te Morenga, were the four principal Te Rarawa signatories who are known to have signed He Whakaputanga.

In 1843, a skirmish over land ownership arose between Nōpera Panakareao and Pororua, the latter belonging to Ngāpuhi. As the situation developed into fighting, Pāpāhia went with a party of men to Oruru to persuade Panakareao to stop fighting and return home via Hikurangi. Panakareao was offended, thinking that Pāpāhia's advice implied cowardice on his part, and refused to return home, expect by Taipa. Panakareao waited until the tide was out, and marched down the bed of the river, whilst Pāpāhia climbed to the top of the Hikurangi hill to sit down and watch the events unfold. Panakareao's men were described as having "acted in a most defiant manner" when they neared their opponents' pās. A musket went off either intentionally or accidentally, and a woman was killed. Shots were exchanged and a Te Rarawa man named Ruana was shot dead through the mouth and head. Falling face downwards, his mouth was filled with sand. The conflict was thus known as Te Waka Kai Onepu ('the mouth that ate sand').

Pāpāhia was also known for his poetic abilities. He was famed for his waiata tangi; this included the mōteatea He tangi mō Te Huhu, which he composed for his brother, Te Hūhū, who had died of natural causes.

Pāpāhia died sometime in the 1850s, with his son, Wiremu Tana, sending the words of Pāpāhia's last composed waiata to a Māori-language newspaper, Te Waka o Te Iwi, in 1857. The waiata was a lament for the trees felled by Pākehā at Whakairi, Pāpāhia's wāhi tapu (sacred place).
