= Anaru =

Anaru or Ānaru is both a given name or a surname. It is a Māori transliteration for Andrew. Notable people with the name include:

== Given name ==
- Anaru Cassidy (born 2006), New Zealand footballer
- Ānaru Iehu Ngāwaka (1872–1964), New Zealand clergyman
- Anaru Kitchen (born 1984), New Zealand cricket player
- Anaru Matete (died 1890), New Zealand Rongowhakaata leader and farmer
- Anaru Paenga-Morgan (born 2003), New Zealand rugby union player
- Anaru Rangi (born 1988), New Zealand rugby union player

== Surname ==
- Claude Anaru (1901–1977), New Zealand politician and community leader

== Fictional characters ==
- Anaru, or Naruko Anjō, one of the leading characters in AnoHana

== See also ==
- Anaru, a Japanese slang meaning "sodomy," from English "anal"
- Anārū, or Anaru-ye Yaieh, village in Kerman, Iran
