= Matt Brown (author) =

New Zealand author and advocate

Matt Brown MNZM
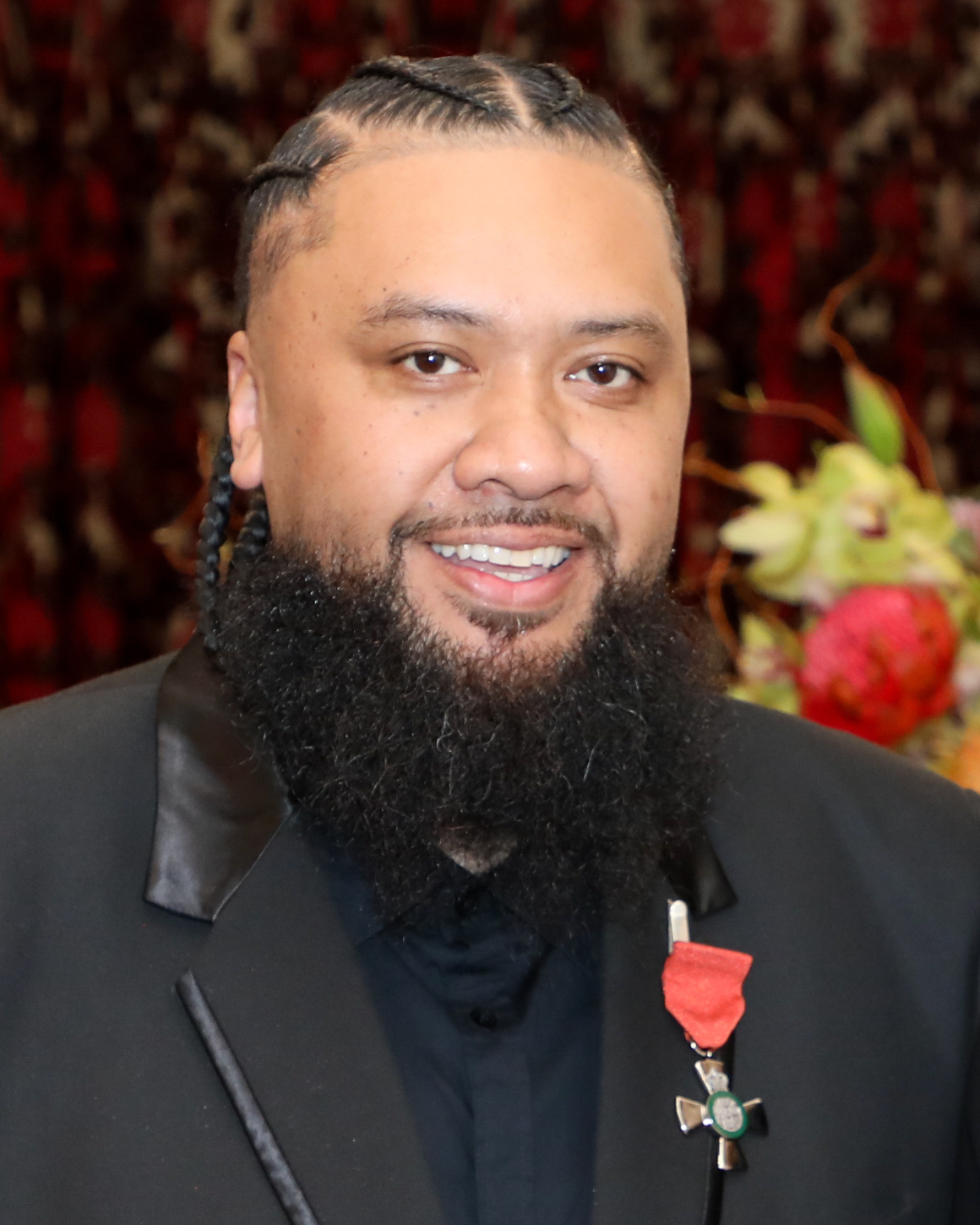
- Brown in 2022
- Born: Matthew Faafetai Malietoa Brown; 27 January 1986 (age 40) New Zealand
- Occupation: Author; anti-violence advocate; barber
- Notable works: She Is Not Your Rehab (2021); This Is Not Yours to Carry (2025)
- Spouse: Sarah Brown (m. 2015)

Matthew Faafetai Malietoa "Mataio" Brown MNZM (born 27 January 1986) is a New Zealand author, communicator, internationally acclaimed barber, and social advocate. He is the co-founder of the global movement She Is Not Your Rehab, which seeks to support men in confronting trauma, promoting healing, and reducing cycles of domestic and family violence.

== Early life and background ==
Brown was born in New Zealand and is of Samoan heritage. His early life included exposure to family violence and childhood sexual abuse, which he has publicly addressed in his work. Before his advocacy, Brown was a barber and hair artist, operating a barbershop in Christchurch called My Fathers Barbers.

== Career and advocacy ==
In 2019, Brown introduced the She Is Not Your Rehab concept in a TEDx talk entitled "The Barbershop Where Men Go to Heal". It launched the She Is Not Your Rehab movement, which has grown into a broader campaign encouraging men to take responsibility for their healing.

In 2020, a social media campaign video titled "Dear Mr Rock", a video letter to Dwayne "the Rock" Johnson, went viral and received extensive publicity, resulting in a response from Johnson.

Brown facilitated free men's anti-violence support groups in nontraditional spaces (e.g., barbershops, construction sites) and inside correctional facilities. He developed a digital app (innerBoy) designed to support men through trauma-informed programs, accessible in New Zealand and soon to be launched in Australia and worldwide.

In 2021, he distributed She Is Not Your Rehab books to all male prisoners across New Zealand.

In the 2022 Queen's Birthday Honours, Brown was appointed a Member of the New Zealand Order of Merit, for services to mental health and the prevention of family violence. He also received a Commonwealth Points of Light award.

== Publications ==
In 2021, Brown and Sarah Brown published their first book She Is Not Your Rehab: One Man's Journey to Healing and the Global Anti-Violence Movement He Inspired. The book became New Zealand's bestselling book in the year of its release. Copies of the book have been donated to prisons across the world, with every inmate in New Zealand receiving a free copy as part of an initiative to support men's rehabilitation.

The Browns have also released a children's book, This Is Not Yours to Carry. They plan to distribute 150,000 copies of their children's book to young people who have experienced violence in abusive households.

== Personal life ==
Brown lives in Christchurch and is married to Sarah Brown, who works alongside him in advocacy, writing, and community development. Sarah is of Māori descent (Ngāpuhi / Te Rarawa) and is a writer, celebrant, and training to become a registered therapist. She was appointed a Member of the New Zealand Order of Merit alongside her husband, also for services to mental health and the prevention of family violence, in the 2022 Queen's Birthday Honours.

In September 2025, Matt and Sarah Brown celebrated their 10th wedding anniversary in Fiji, renewing their vows alongside their children.

== Selected works ==
- Brown, Matt; Brown, Sarah (2021). She Is Not Your Rehab: One Man's Journey to Healing and the Global Anti‑Violence Movement He Inspired.
- Brown, Matt; Brown, Sarah (2025). This Is Not Yours to Carry.
