= Lake Waimimiha =

Lake in the North Island of New Zealand

- Location within Northland Region
- Location: Northland Region, North Island
- Coordinates: 35.145573°S 173.170067°E
- Type: dune lake
- Primary inflows: Wairoa Stream (via a wetland)
- Primary outflows: Unnamed stream, into unnamed lake (which flows into Ahipara Bay)
- Basin countries: New Zealand
- Surface area: 2.2 hectares (5.4 acres)
- Max. depth: 2 metres (6 ft 7 in)

Lake Waimimiha is a dune lake in the Northland Region of New Zealand. It is located to the Northeast of Ahipara in the dunes behind Ninety Mile Beach.

The lake catchment is predominantly pasture with some market gardening.

== See also ==
- List of lakes in New Zealand
