= Lake Morehurehu =

- Location within Northland Region
- Location: Northland Region, North Island
- Coordinates: 34.6440°S 172.9964°E
- Type: Dune Lake
- Catchment area: 3.16 km^{2} (1.22 mi^{2})
- Basin countries: New Zealand
- Surface area: 36.3 hectares (90 acres)
- Max. depth: 14 metres (46 ft)
- Residence time: 2.23 years

Lake Morehurehu is a dune lake in the Northland Region of New Zealand. It is located to the Northeast of Te Kao on the Aupouri Peninsula.

The lake has 3 separate stream inlets, the lake discharges from the southeastern end of the lake through a wetland, which flows into Great Exhibition Bay on the peninsula's east coast.

The land use of the lake catchment is pine plantation forestry, the lake itself has a surrounding vegetative zone of manuka/hakea scrub.

The water quality of the lake is monitored by Northland Regional Council, and the environmental information can be viewed on the LAWA website.

== See also ==
- List of lakes in New Zealand
