= Lake Te Kahika =

Lake in the North Island of New Zealand

- Location within Northland Region
- Location: Northland Region, North Island
- Coordinates: 34.6256°S 173.0006°E
- Type: dune lake
- Primary outflows: Kahika Stream
- Basin countries: New Zealand
- Surface area: 18 hectares (44 acres)
- Max. depth: 10.8 metres (35 ft)

Lake Te Kahika is a dune lake located on the Aupōuri Peninsula in the Northland Region of New Zealand. It is one of the country's northernmost lakes.

Lake Te Kahika was formed by a stream system impounded by dunes. The lake is shaped with two arms each fed by an inflow and the western edge of the lake discharges into Great Exhibition Bay on the east coast of the peninsula via Kahika Stream.

The lake catchment is predominantly pine plantation forestry, and with the intermediate vegetative zone of manuka and hakea scrub.

The water quality of the lake is monitored by Northland Regional Council

== See also ==
- List of lakes in New Zealand
