= Māmari Stephens =

New Zealand legal academic and chaplain (born 1970)

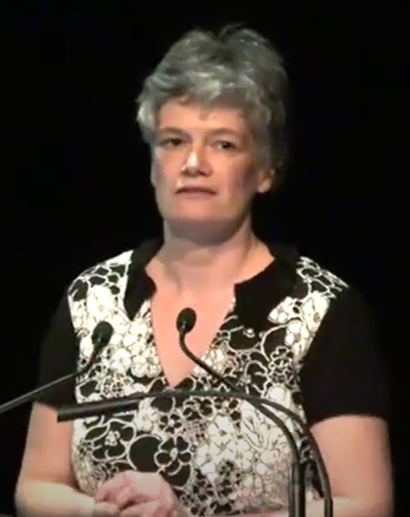
- Giving a talk on Māori legal resources in 2015
- Born: 1970 (age 55–56); Christchurch
- Education: Victoria University of Wellington MA (Distinction) in Classical Studies, BA (Hons), and an LLB (Hons)
- Occupations: Research fellow, assistant lecturer, Anglican Māori chaplain
- Spouse: Maynard Gilgen
- Children: 3
- Website: sparrowhawkkarearea.com

Māmari Stephens (born 1970) is a law academic best known for her work creating He Papakupu Reo Ture: A Dictionary of Māori Legal Terms, a Māori-English a bi-lingual dictionary of legal terms. She identifies as being of Te Rarawa and Ngāti Pākehā descent.

Stephens has a background in classics and law at Victoria University of Wellington, where she is currently a Reader in Law. After graduating, she worked at Russell McVeagh in Wellington for 3.5 years.

In 2019 she was ordained as a priest in the Anglican Church in Aotearoa, New Zealand and Polynesia and is a part-time Māori Chaplain at Victoria University. She is on the Board of Trustees of the Wellington City Mission.

== Legal Māori project ==
Led by Stephens and Mary Boyce of University of Hawaiʻi at Mānoa, this FRST-funded project created the first ever Māori-English bi-lingual dictionary of legal terms, He Papakupu Reo Ture: A Dictionary of Maori Legal Terms. The project involved digitising historical texts, and many of the texts old enough to be out of copyright were released by the New Zealand Electronic Text Centre. In 2025, the book was listed in Books of Mana as one of the 180 most significant works of Māori-authored non-fiction. The other outputs of the Legal Māori Project, including the dictionary, corpus and corpus browser, are all available at www.legalmaori.net as a part of the Māori Law Resource Hub, Te Pokapū Reo Ture.

== Personal life ==
Stephens is married to Maynard Gilgen. They have three children and live in Wellington. She attends St Michael's Church, Kelburn, where she is responsible for youth ministry. Her family whakapapa links her to Wainui marae in Ahipara.

== Selected publications ==
- Social Security and Welfare Law in Aotearoa New Zealand (Thomsen and Reuters, 2019) ISBN 9781988553566
- He Papakupu Reo Ture: A Dictionary of Maori Legal Terms ISBN 9781927183748 (section winner of the Nga Kupu Ora Aotearoa Maori Book Awards.)
- "A Return to the Tohunga Suppression Act 1907", Victoria University Wellington Law Review, 32, 437
