= Parengarenga Harbour =

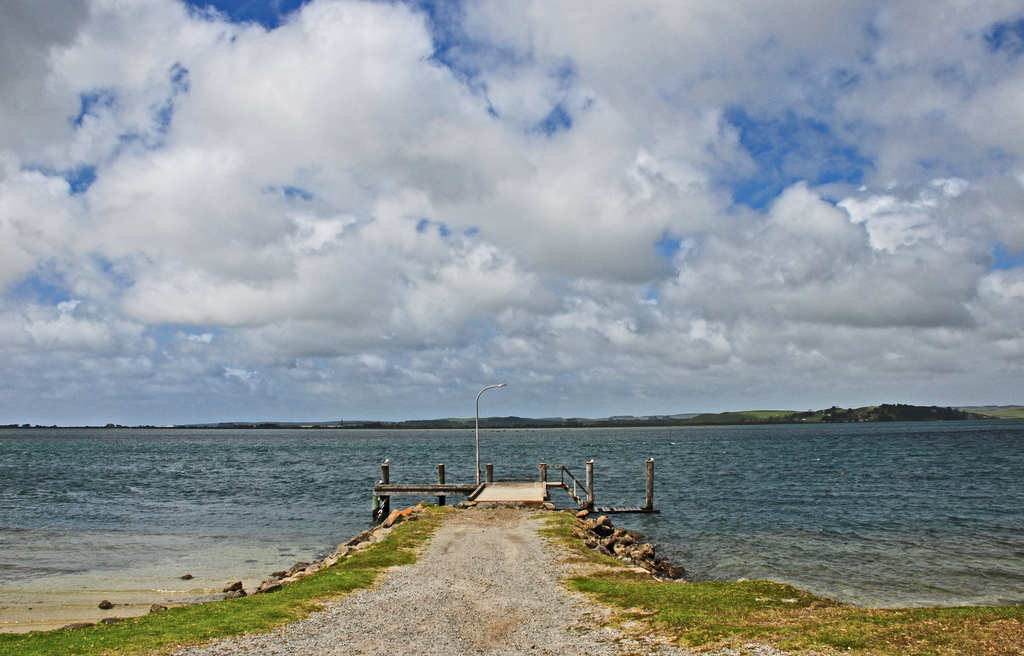
- Te Hāpua Wharf and Parengarenga Harbour

- Location within New Zealand
- Location: Northland Region, New Zealand
- Coordinates: 34°31′S 172°57′E
- Ocean/sea sources: Pacific Ocean
- Basin countries: New Zealand
- Sections/sub-basins: Taraere Bay, Te Kao Bay
- Settlements: Te Hāpua, Tangoake

Location and extent of Parengarenga Harbour

Parengarenga Harbour is a natural harbour close to the northernmost point on the North Island of New Zealand. Located at the northern end of the Aupōuri Peninsula, it extends inland for over 10 kilometres, almost severing the northern tip of the island from the rest of the peninsula. The harbour's mouth is towards the northern end of Great Exhibition Bay. The island's northernmost point, at the North Cape is only about 10 kilometres north of the harbour. Te Hāpua is a settlement at the western side of the harbour.

== History ==
The harbour was an important location for the kauri gum digging trade in the latter 19th and early 20th centuries, as some of the highest quality kauri gum could be found around the harbour. The Parenga Gumfield Company was formed to harvest this resource.

The white sand of Kokota Sandspit, at the southern head of Parengarenga Harbour, has provided a source of high purity silica sand for glassmaking. Dredging continued here until 1997. While smaller or lower purity deposits are found elsewhere in Northland, the Parengarenga area holds the region's largest silica sand resource by far.

Samuel Yates and his wife, Ngāwini Yates, were prominent landowners in the area in the later part of the 19th century and had a homestead on the southern side of the harbour, at Paua.

== Ecology ==
The water is a habitat for Green sea turtles and dolphins, while Orca, and Pilot whales visit the adjacent areas.

== Gallery ==
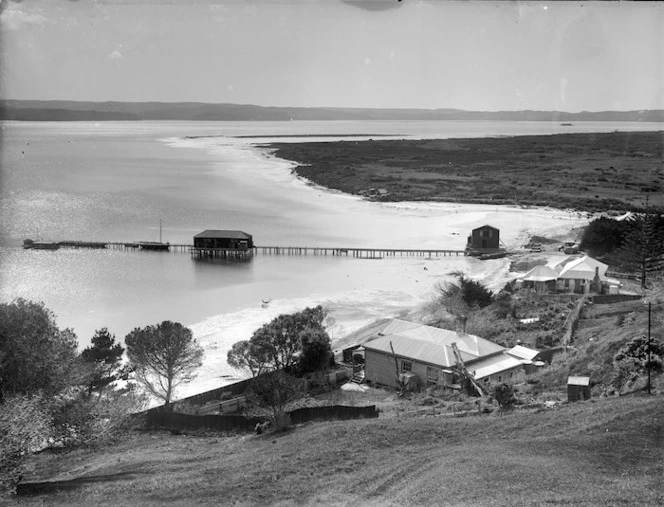
The Yates property at Parengarenga Harbour, 1910

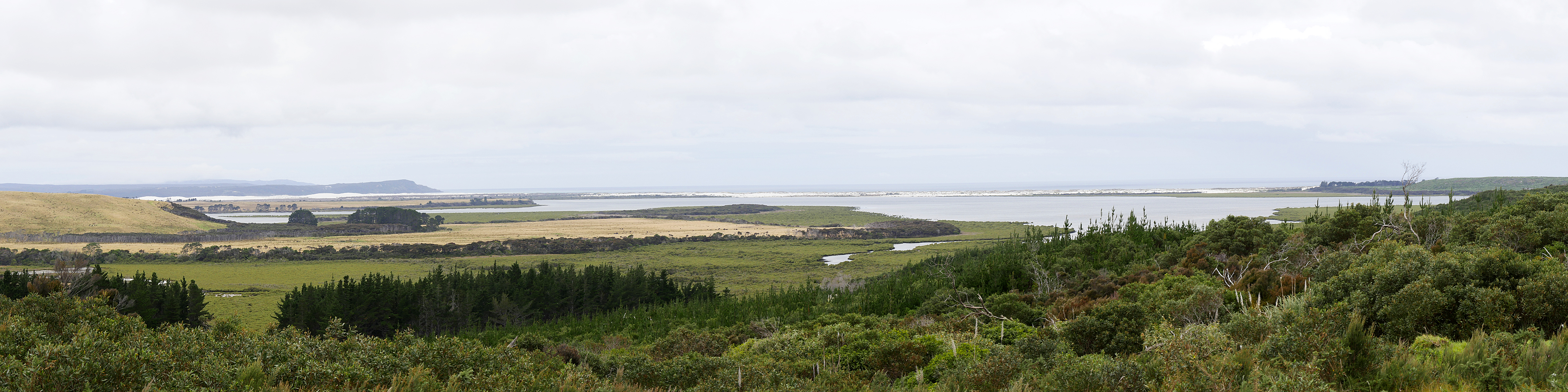
Panorama of the Parengarenga Harbour

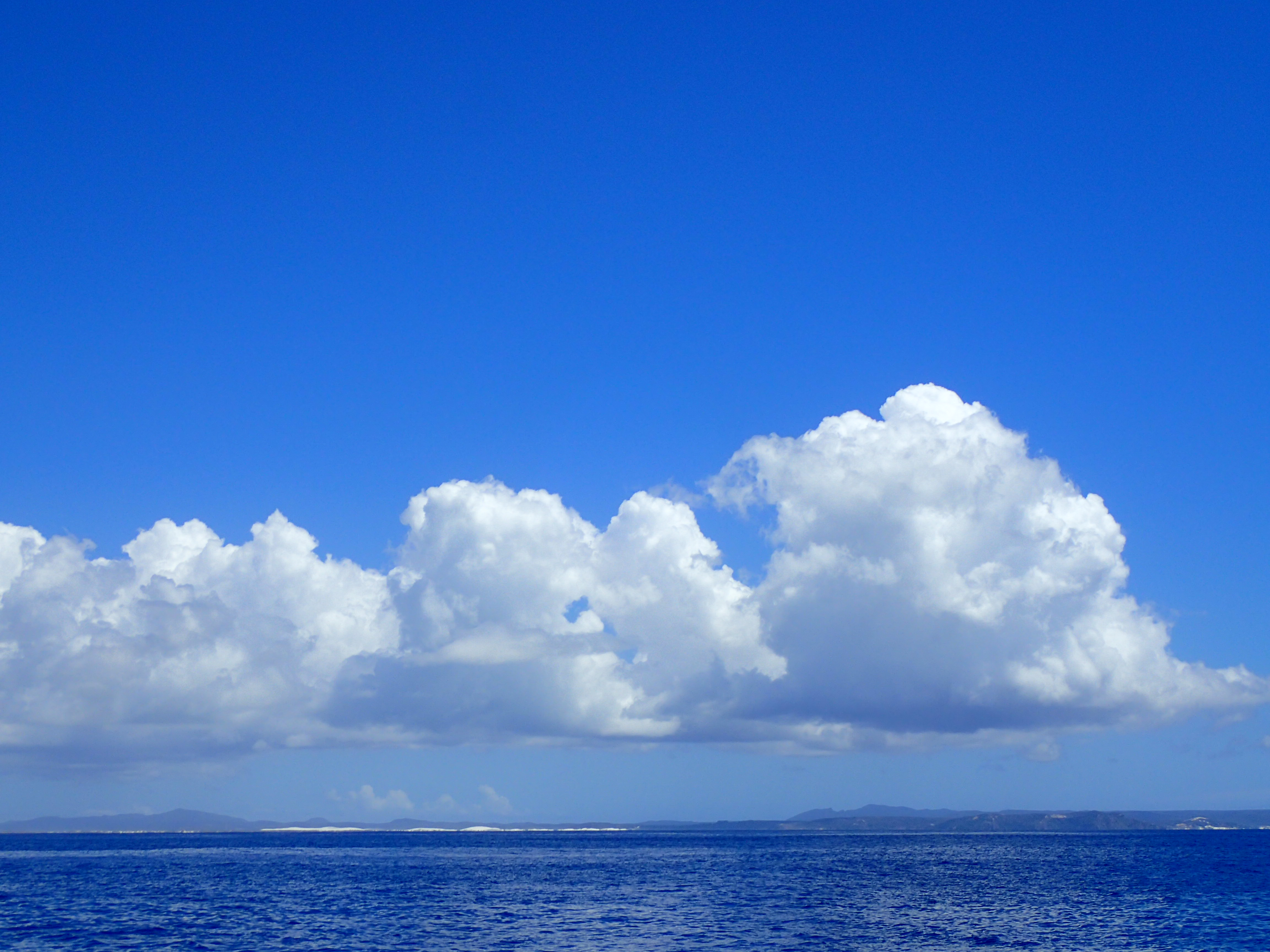
Parengaranga from Great Exhibition Bay
