= Symonds Street Cemetery =

Cemetery in Auckland, New Zealand

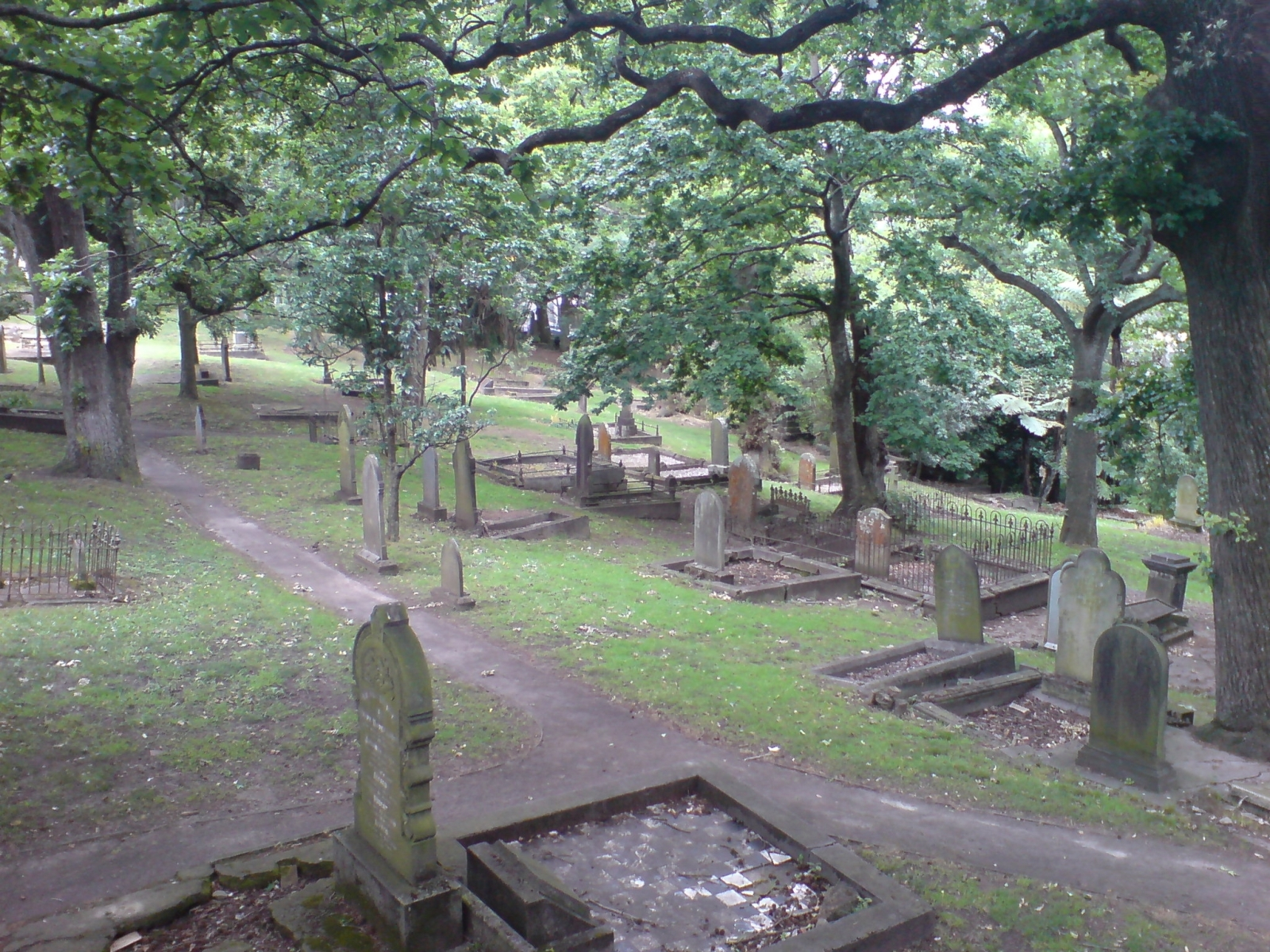
- Interactive map of Symonds Street Cemetery

Details
- Established: 1842
- Location: Auckland
- Country: New Zealand
- Coordinates: 36.8595°S 174.7642°E
- Type: Historic
- No. of graves: 1200 known
- No. of interments: 10,000 or more (estimated)
- Find a Grave: Symonds Street Cemetery

Heritage New Zealand – Category 1
- Official name: Symonds Street Cemetery
- Designated: 27 June 2008
- Reference no.: 7753

Symonds Street Cemetery is a historic cemetery and park in central Auckland, New Zealand. It is in 5.8 hectares of deciduous forest on the western slope of Grafton Gully, by the corner of Symonds Street and Karangahape Road, and is crossed by the Grafton Bridge. The street (and by extension, the cemetery) is named for William Cornwallis Symonds, a British Army officer prominent in the early colonisation of New Zealand. It has a Historic Place – Category I listing with the New Zealand Historic Places Trust. Maintenance and administration of the cemetery is provided by the Auckland Council.

== History ==
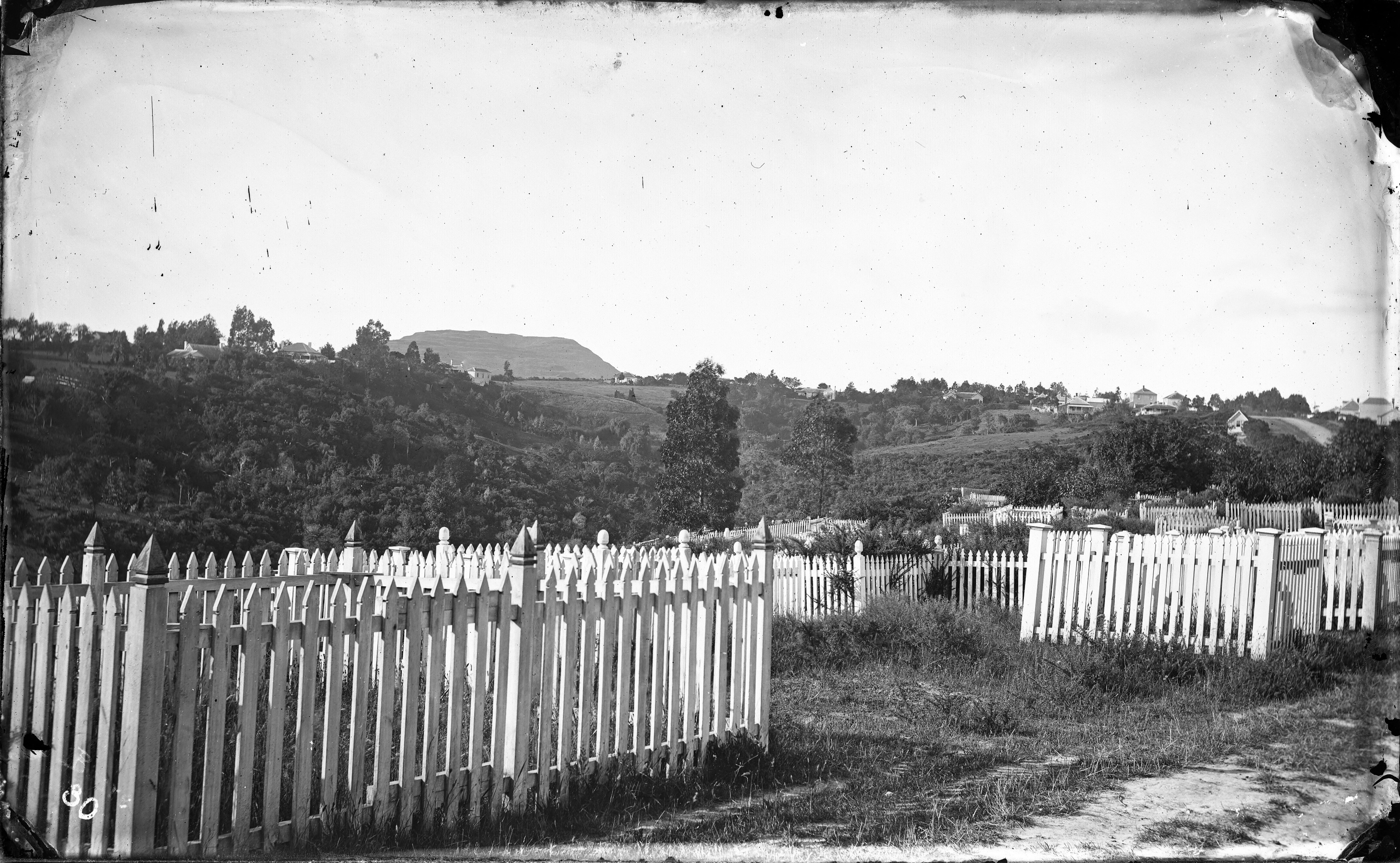
Symonds Street Cemetery in 1863, with Maungawhau / Mount Eden in the background

Symonds Street Cemetery was the first official cemetery in Auckland and has been in use since 1842. Initially, it was divided into four sections for Anglicans, Catholics, and Jews, and a shared Presbyterian, Wesleyan, and general sections. By 1852, the shared section became Presbyterian, and an additional Wesleyan and general section was added.

After establishing a new municipal cemetery in West Auckland at Waikumete, the Symonds Street Cemetery was closed for burials in 1886, other than to existing family plots. No new plots were sold. In 1909, the Auckland City Council took over management of the cemetery.

Due to the development of the Auckland Southern Motorway during the mid-1960s, more than 4,100 bodies were moved and re-interred into two memorial sites at the cemetery. The land area was reduced by about a quarter. During the relocation, 2000 graves were found under 1200 headstones in the Anglican section, and 2100 graves under 400 headstones were found in the Catholic section. Many of Auckland's early colonists are buried here, including William Hobson, the first Governor of New Zealand and co-author of the Treaty of Waitangi.

The New Zealand Herald columnist Brian Rudman has repeatedly criticised the state of disrepair, vandalism, and the presence of vagrants at the cemetery and called for the city council to improve the maintenance. Although the Auckland City Council commissioned the Symonds St Cemetery Conservation Plan in 1996, only some of its recommendations have been implemented. The Council does employ a specialist stonemason to undertake gravestone restoration, but as many of the restored gravestones have been subsequently vandalised, the Waitamata Local Board admits the situation is much like "treading water". Security guards do patrol the cemetery at irregular intervals but have proved largely ineffective in stopping further damage.

In October 2012, more than 20 of the headstones were sprayed with antisemitic graffiti and swastikas. The vandalism occurred the night before a white nationalist celebration called "Flag Day". Three people were arrested, but in November, the charges against one were dropped due to a lack of evidence.

== Notable burials ==
- Archibald Clark (1805–1875), 1st Mayor of Auckland Borough Council in 1851
- Edward Costley (1794–1883), land owner and philanthropist
- Thomas Henderson (1810–1886), significant entrepreneur who gave his name to the suburb of Henderson
- William Hobson (1792–1842), first Governor of New Zealand and co-author of the Treaty of Waitangi
- William Hulme (1788–1855), officer in the British Army
- Henry Keesing (1791–1879), early pioneer, entrepreneur, financier and community leader
- Edward Mahoney (1824 or 1825–1895), Irish-born architect
- Frederick Edward Maning (1812–1883), writer and judge of the Native Land Court
- Frederick Merriman (1818–1865), MP in the first two Parliaments
- David Nathan (1816–1886), merchant and Jewish community leader
- Thomas Peacock (1837–1922), optician, Mayor of Auckland, MP
- Philip Philips (1831–1913), 1st Mayor of Auckland City (1871–1874)
- George Dean Pitt (1772–1851), Lieutenant-Governor of New Ulster Province
- Annie Jane Schnackenberg (1835–1905), missionary, temperance and suffrage activist.
- John Sheehan (1844–1885), MP from 1872 to 1885
- Charles Southwell (1814–1860), radical English journalist and freethinker
- William Turnbull Swan (1827–1875), MP from 1868 to 1870
- Charles de Thierry (1793–1864), adventurer who attempted to establish his own sovereign state in New Zealand before British annexation
- Henry Tucker (1793–1850), Royal Navy officer and first colonial storekeeper
- James and Mary Wallis, early Wesleyan missionaries to New Zealand
- William White (1794–1875), an early Methodist missionary
- Samuel Yates (1829–1900), a prominent trader from Northland

== Gravestones ==
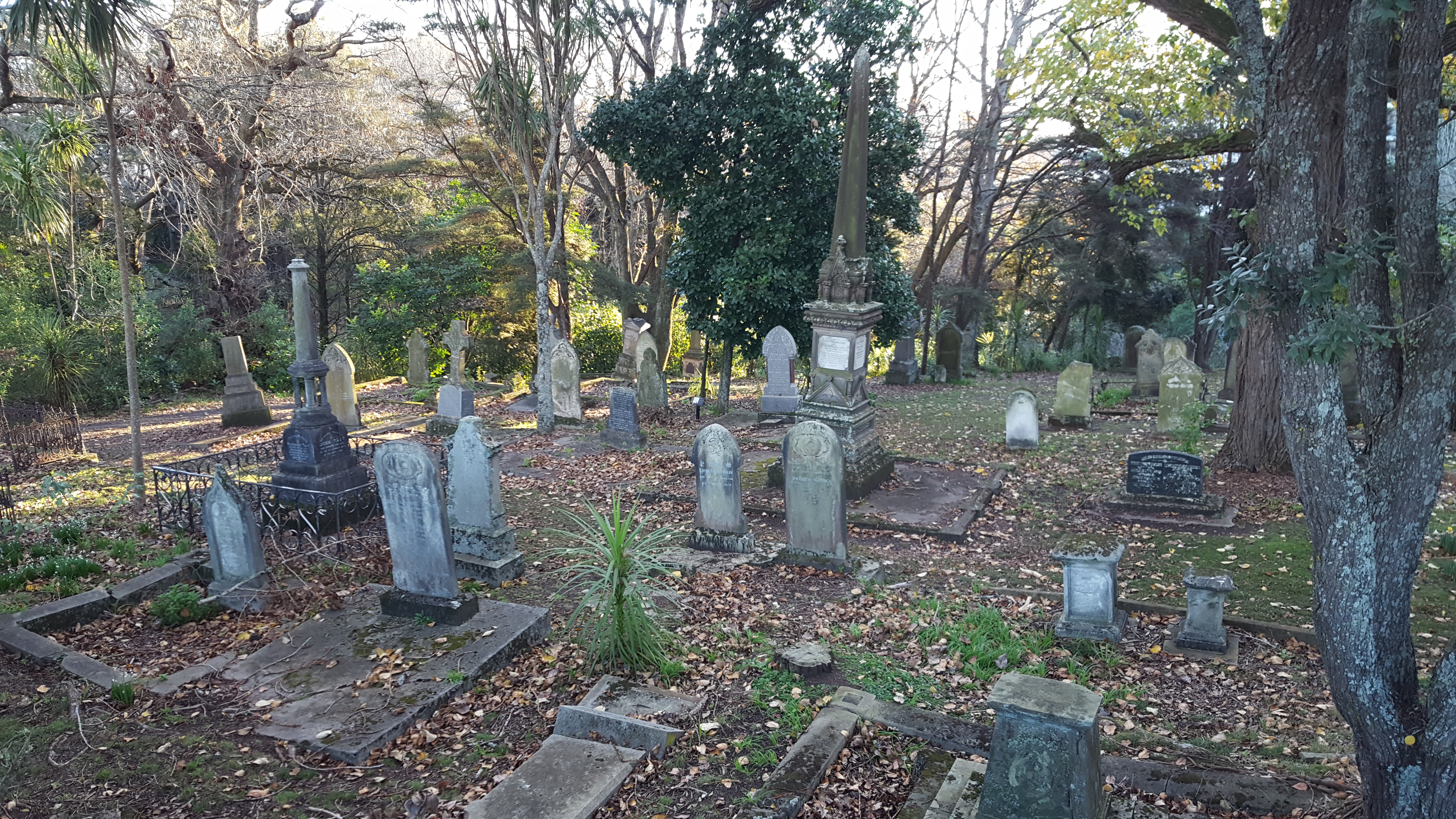

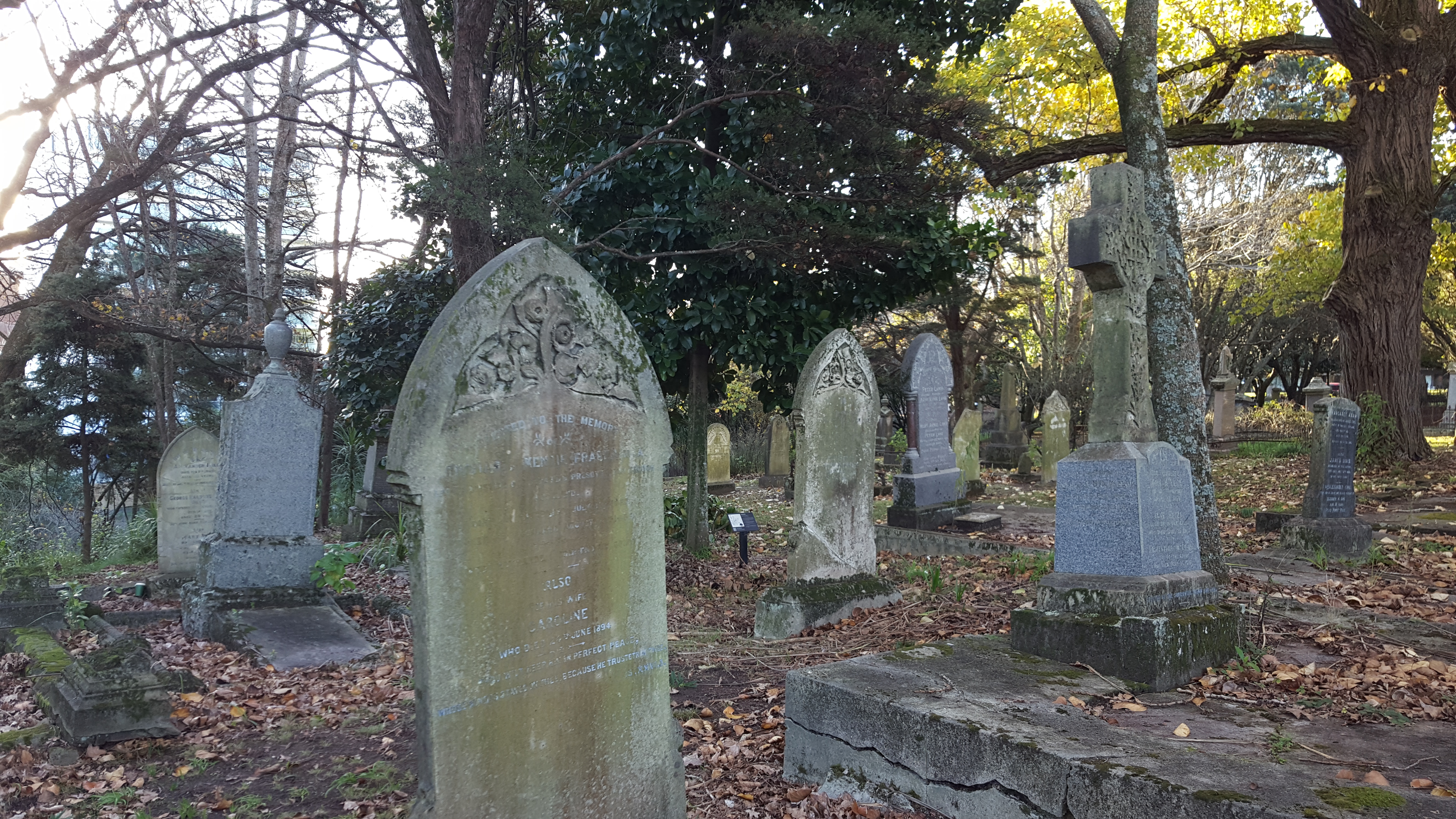

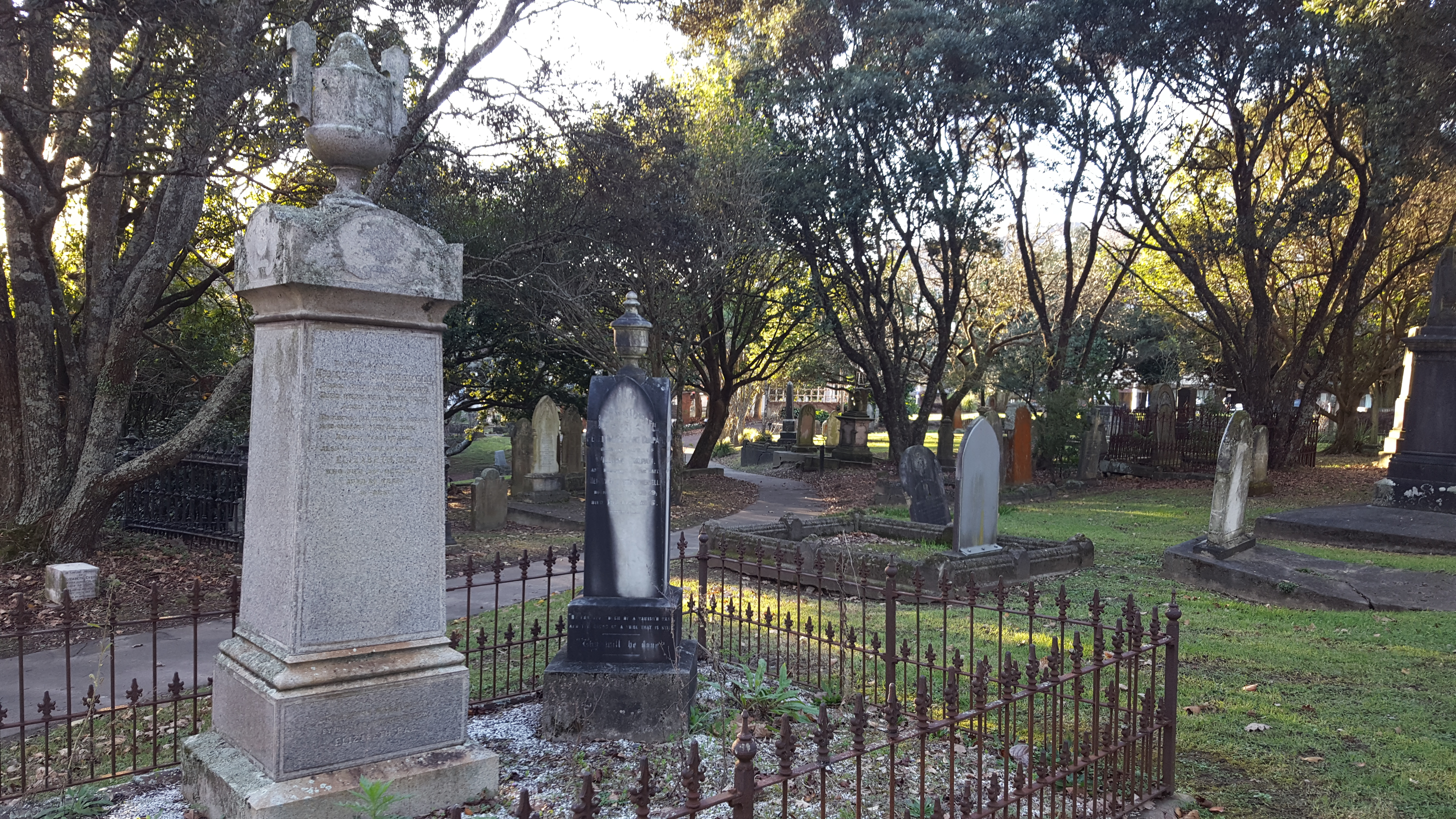

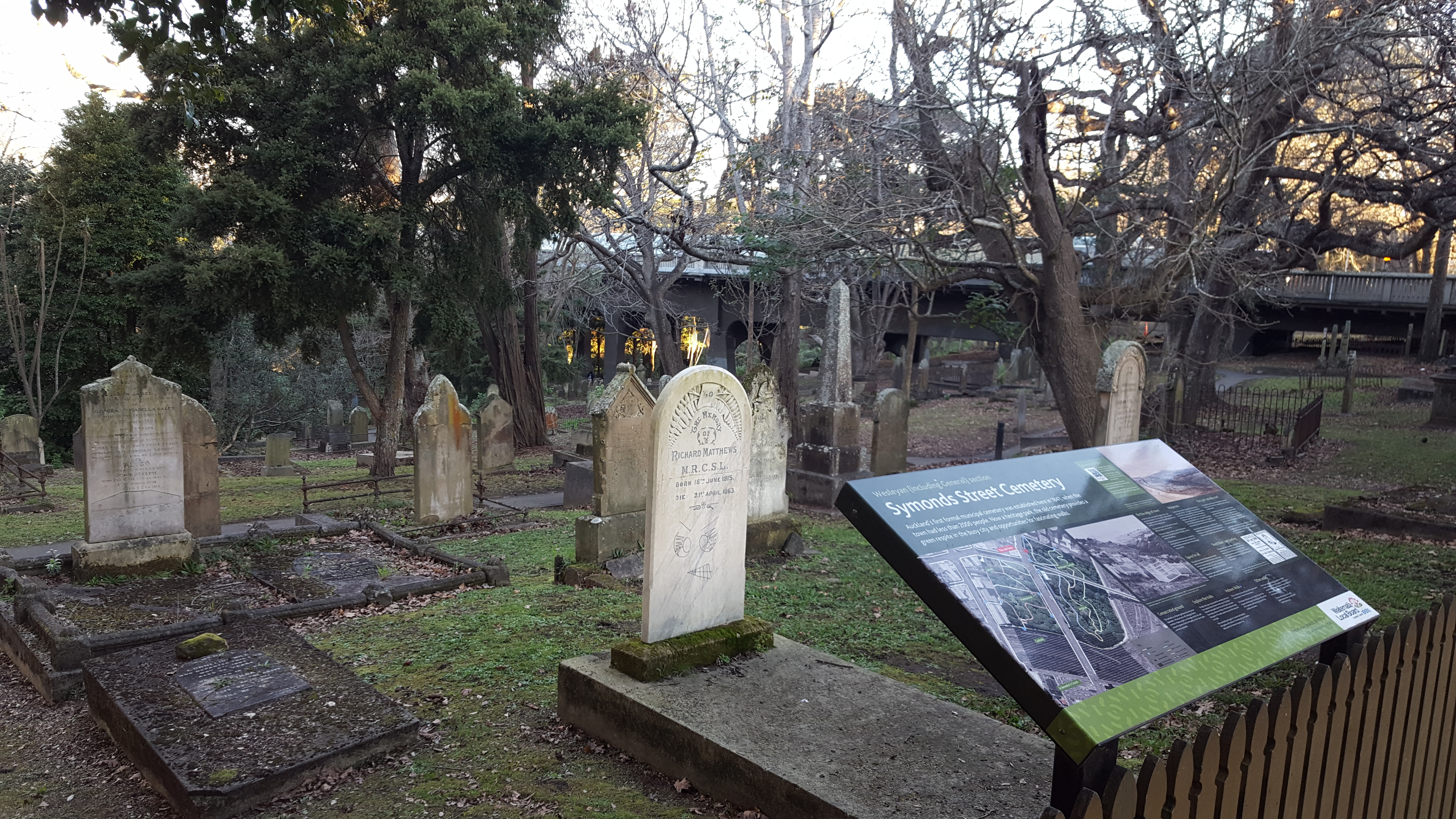

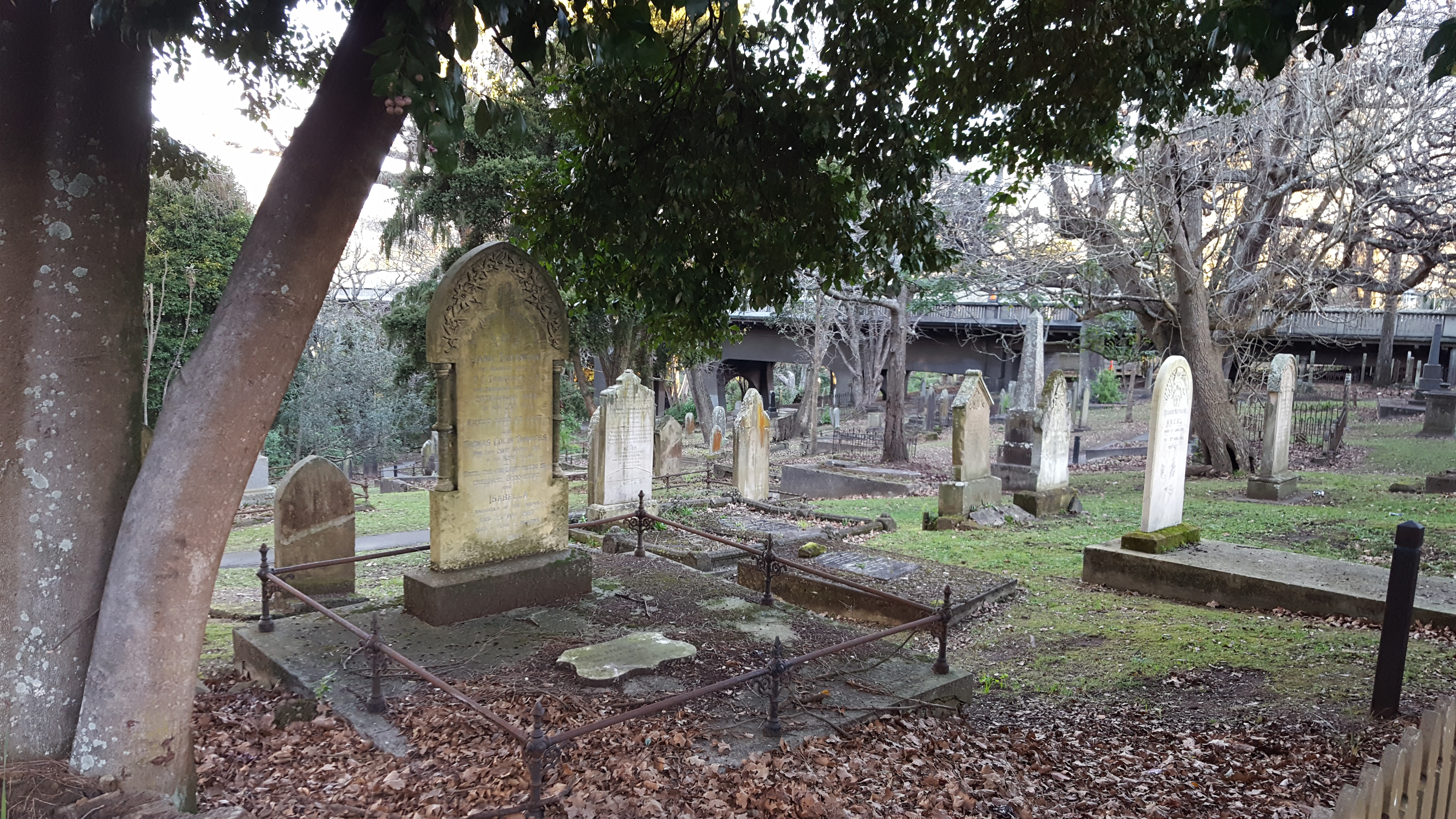

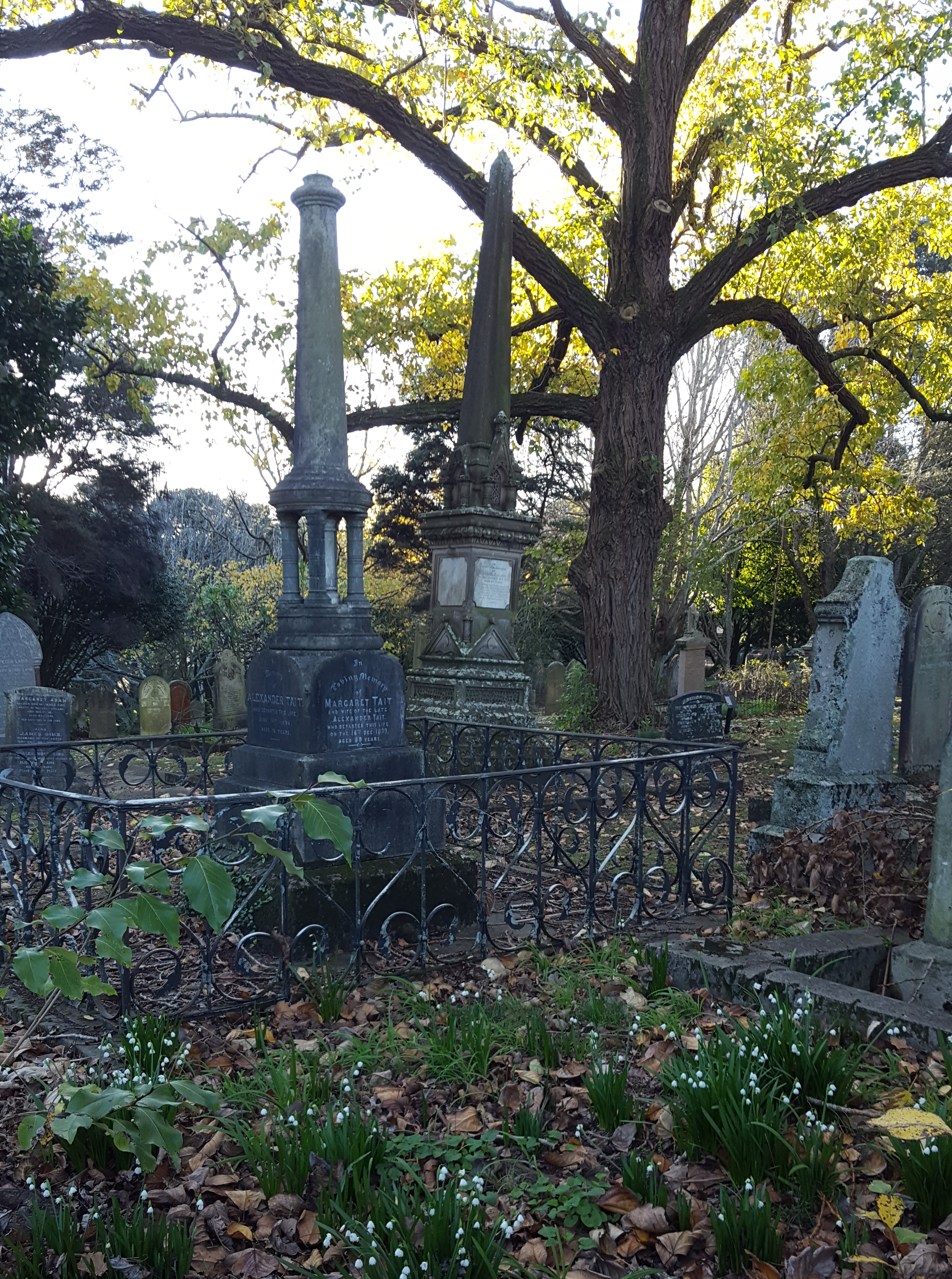

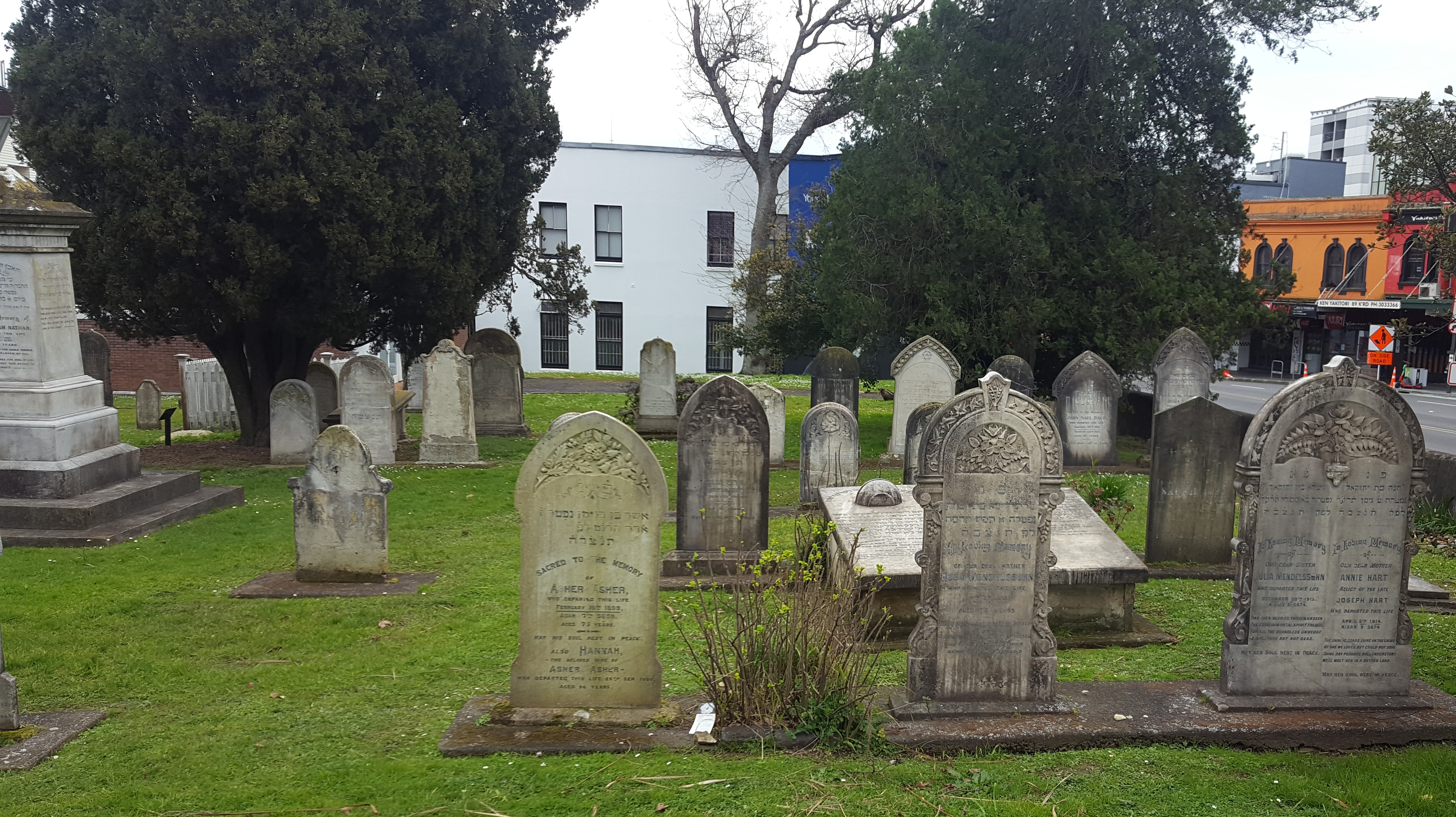
