= Anaru Matete =

Anaru Matete (died 19 September 1890) was a New Zealand Rongowhakaata leader and farmer. Of Māori descent, he identified with the Rongowhakaata iwi. He was born in East Coast, New Zealand.
