= Ereonora =

High-ranking Māori woman

Ereonora (died 1848) was a high-ranking Māori woman of the Te Rarawa iwi (tribe) in northern New Zealand. She is known for signing the Treaty of Waitangi on 28 April 1840. She was one of the few women to sign this document. Her husband Nōpera Panakareao also signed, opposite her name. Ereonora was influential in spreading Christianity throughout her tribe.

Ereonora died in March 1848, and was buried on 22 March, with William Puckey reading the lesson, and Joseph Matthews delivering the prayer.
