= Anaru-ye Yaieh =

Anaru-ye Yaieh انارو ئيه
- Village
- Location within Iran
- Coordinates: 28°55′27″N 58°03′52″E
- Country: Iran
- Province: Kerman
- County: Anbarabad
- Bakhsh: Central
- Rural District: Amjaz

Population (2006)
  - Total: 23
- Time zone: UTC+3:30 (IRST)
  - Summer (DST): UTC+4:30 (IRDT)

Anaru-ye Yaieh (Persian: انارو ئيه, also romanized as Anārū-ye Yaīeh; also known as Anārū) is a village in Amjaz Rural District, in the Central District of Anbarabad County, Kerman Province, Iran. At the 2006 census, its population was 23, in 6 families.
