= Ānaru Iehu Ngāwaka =

New Zealand clergyman

Ānaru Iehu Ngāwaka (1872–1964) was a New Zealand Te Rarawa leader and Anglican clergyman.
