= North Cape (New Zealand) =

Northernmost point of New Zealand's main islands

North Cape / Otou Otou (Māori)
- Cape
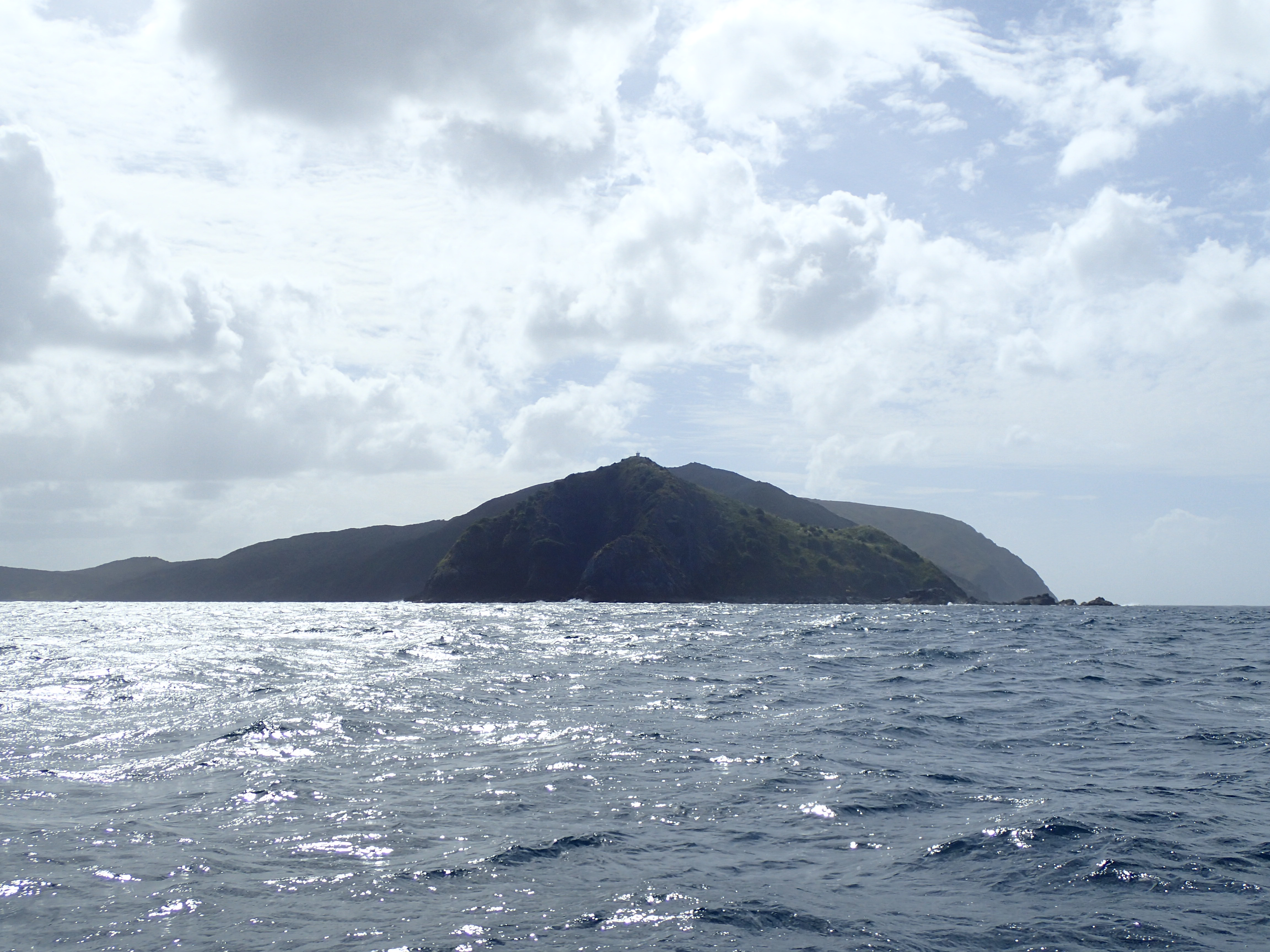
- Murimotu Island (nearest) with the navigation light just visible on top, Otou just behind the light to the right and Surville Cliffs extending out to the right in the background

- Location within New Zealand
- Coordinates: 34.415°S 173.051°E

North Cape is the northernmost point of the North Island, and therefore of New Zealand's main islands. At the northeastern tip of the Aupōuri Peninsula, the cape lies 30 kilometres (19 mi) east and three kilometres (2 mi) north of Cape Reinga.

James Cook, commander of Endeavour, named it "North Cape" in December 1769, judging it to be the northern extremity of the country. He described it as a peninsula about 2 miles (3.2 km) long, jutting out north-east and terminating in a bluff head that was flat at top, with the headland joined to the mainland by a very low isthmus. From at least 1857 to the present, official maps have used the name "North Cape" to refer just to the eastern point of this headland, which is known in Māori as Otou or Ōtū and terminates in Murimotu Island. However, Cook's description matches the whole headland plus the tombolo or isthmus that connects it to the mainland. Surville Cliffs is the very northernmost edge of the headland.

== Geography ==
The whole North Cape headland has an area of about 5 square miles (13 km^{2}). It was once an island formed by a marine volcano. Sand deposited by ocean currents eventually formed a tombolo that joined the island to the rest of the Aupōuri Peninsula. Tom Bowling Bay (Māori: Takapaukura) is on the north-west side of the tombolo, and Waikuku Beach on the eastern side. Most of the tombolo is named Waikuku Flat, with part at the eastern end named Takapaukura Flat.

Surville Cliffs (Māori: Hikurua) rise 200 metres (660 ft) from the sea and form the northernmost edge of the headland, and hence of the New Zealand mainland. At the top of the cliffs is a plateau that rises not much higher, reaching a maximum of 234 metres (768 ft) above sea level.

At the eastern end of the headland is Titirangi Point and Murimotu Island, a tidal island that has a navigation light on its peak 97 metres (318 ft) above sea level. At high tide Murimotu is separated from Titirangi Point by about 75 metres (246 ft) of sea and at low tide it is joined to it by a stretch of gravel and boulders. Kerr Point forms the westernmost point of the headland, at the north-eastern end of Tom Bowling Bay.

Statistics New Zealand uses a statistical area called North Cape for population data, extending south down the Aupōuri Peninsula to the Houhora Heads.

== History ==
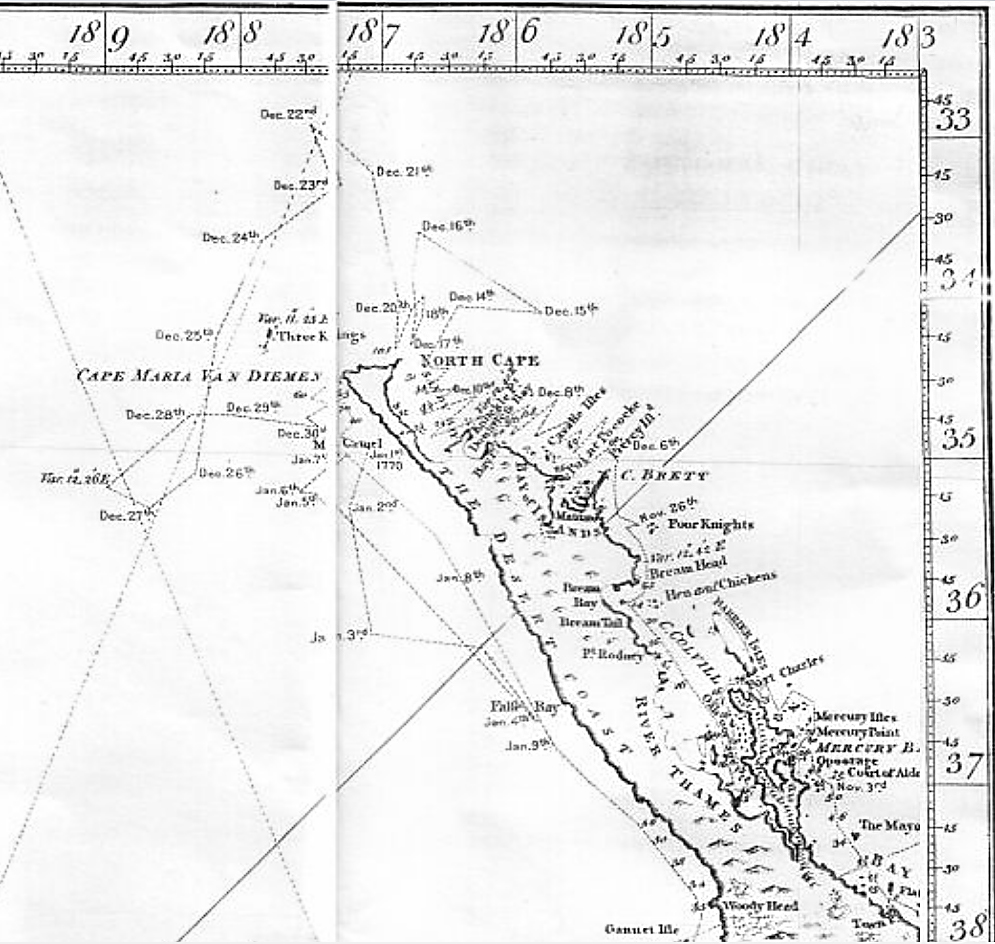
Course of Endeavour around the northern North Island in 1769

Course of Saint Jean-Baptist in 1769 and route of Endeavour for part of the time

The principal Māori tribe of the North Cape area is Ngāti Kurī.

British explorer James Cook, in command of Endeavour in its 1769–1770 voyage, sighted North Cape on 10 December 1769 while off Doubtless Bay. Endeavour headed north-west towards the cape, but the winds were from the north-west so the ship made slow progress over several days. Then the weather turned to south-west gales and Endeavour was blown out to sea north-east of the cape and out of sight of land. Meanwhile, French explorer Jean-François-Marie de Surville in Saint Jean-Baptiste arrived off the west coast of Northland from out in the Tasman Sea on 12 December. The same winds that had made Cook's headway difficult threatened to drive Saint Jean-Baptiste ashore. The French ship struggled northwards, then on 16 December rounded Cape Reinga. Now in calm seas and heading eastward, for which the wind was favourable, Saint Jean-Baptiste made good time and rounded the northernmost cape that afternoon, his officers naming it "Cap Surville". Endeavour was about 30 miles out to sea, by Cook's estimate, and still struggling to make headway, so the British and French remained oblivious to each other. Cook could see land again the next morning, but by then Saint Jean-Baptiste was away to the south, off the entrance to Doubtless Bay.

After a couple of days of still adverse winds and a current that also ran eastward, Endeavour was still in the vicinity of the cape. Cook, in his journal entry for 19 December 1769, recorded that he had named it.

[...] I have call'd [it] North Cape judgeing it to be the northern extremity of this Country. [....] It forms the north point of Sandy Bay [Great Exhibition Bay] and is a Peninsula juting out NE about 2 Miles and terminates in a bluff head which is flat at top; the Isthmus which joins the head to the Main land is very low on which account the land of the Cape from several situations make[s] like an Island.

It was one of the four New Zealand Cardinal Capes that Cook named, the others being Cape East, West Cape and Cape South.

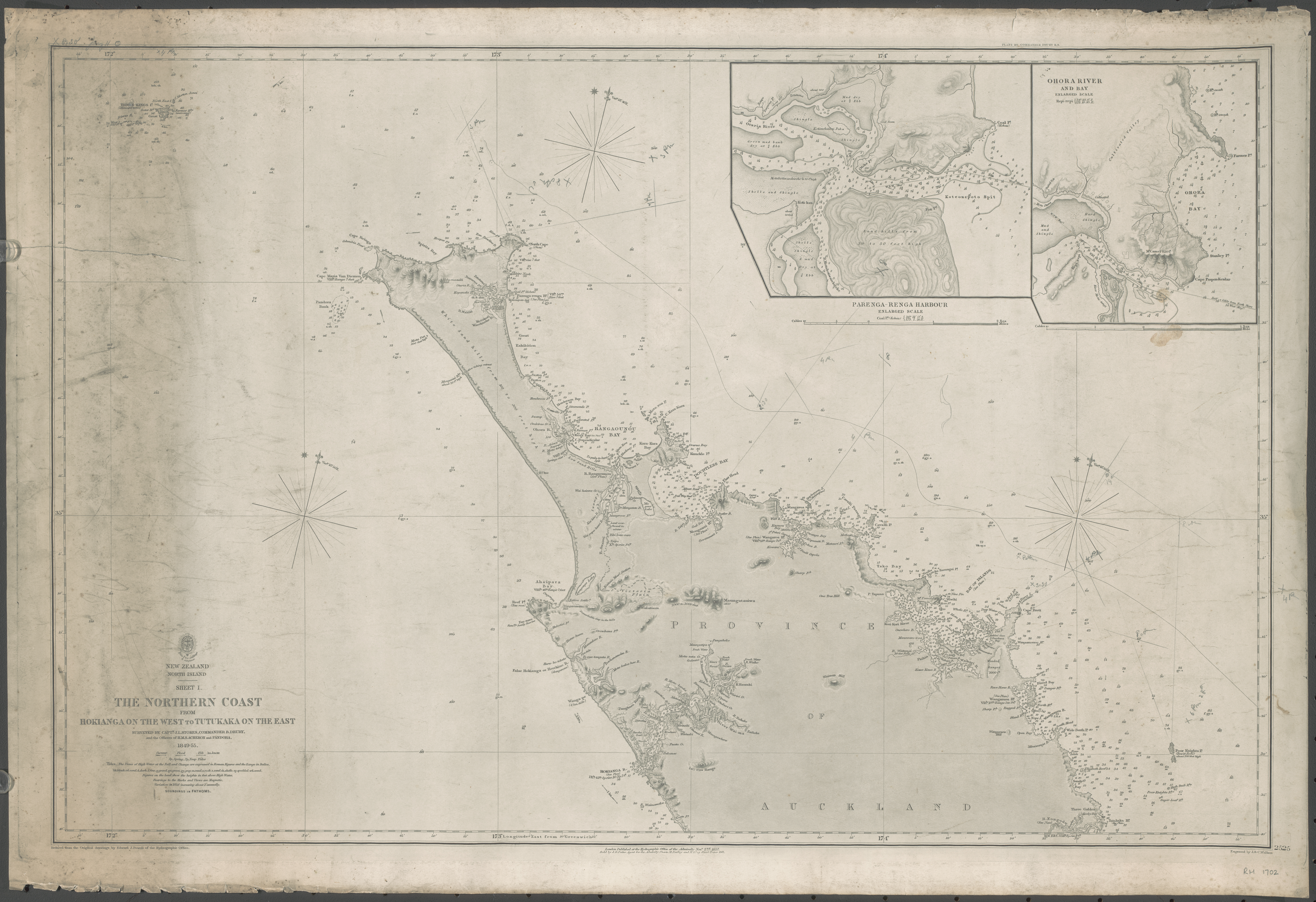
Admiralty chart of 1857

The first Admiralty chart of the far north of New Zealand, published in 1857, showed "North Cape (Otou)" as the eastern point of the headland, that is, Titirangi Point and Murimotu Island, and this is continued on official maps to the present. However, Cook's description of North Cape matches the whole headland plus Waikuku Flat, and "North Cape" is also presently used to refer to the whole landform.

The westernmost point of the headland was first named "Kerr Point" on the Admiralty chart of 1857. Through the 19th century, maps identified it as such, but maps in the 20th century started to show "Kerr Point" as being the northernmost point. This was corrected in 1966, when the northernmost point was given the official name "Surville Cliffs", and "Kerr Point" was returned to its original location. "Surville Cliffs" was changed to "Hikurua / de Surville Cliffs" in 2015.

== Ecology and conservation ==
A large part of North Cape is enclosed in the North Cape Scientific Reserve, whose purpose is to protect the unique flora and fauna of the area, some of it endemic to a small area on Surville Cliffs. An electrified fence was erected in 2000 to create a mainland island by excluding the possums, feral pigs and semi-feral horses of the area. The reserve is managed by the Department of Conservation (DOC) and is closed to the public.

Much of Waikuku Flat is in the Mokaikai Scenic Reserve, another reserve managed by DOC, which stretches south to Parengarenga Harbour. This reserve is open to the public but land access is via an area in Māori tribal ownership and a permit is required from the controlling Māori body to cross the land. Another strip of Māori land lies between the Mokaikai reserve and the North Cape reserve. This strip includes the southern part of North Cape and the northern edge of Waikuku Flat. It stretches from Kerr Point and the north end of Tom Bowling Bay on the north coast across to Tokatoka Point on the west coast.

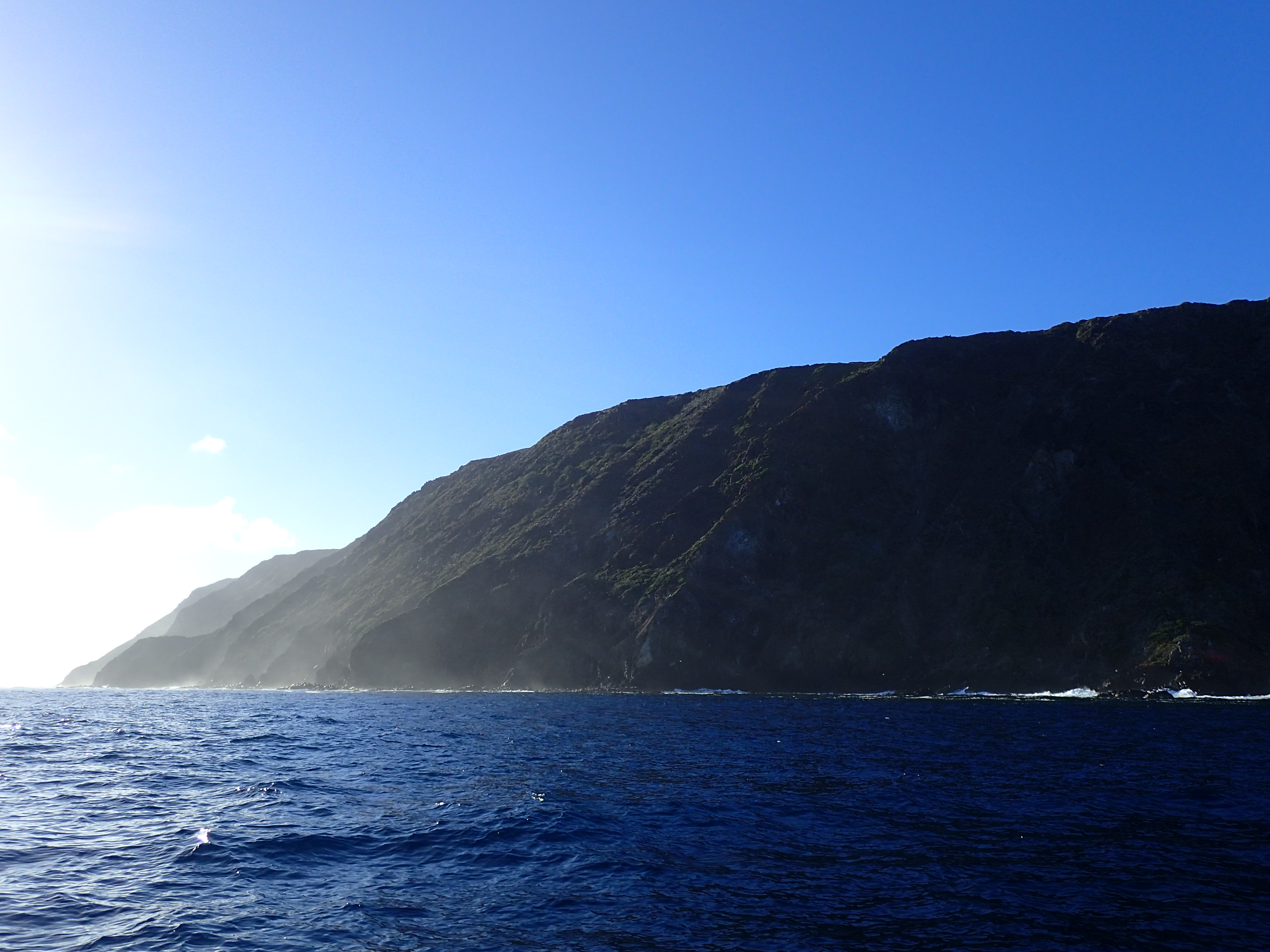
Surville Cliffs from the north-west

The Surville cliffs expose 1.2 square kilometres of serpentinised peridotite mafic rocks. They form a unique environment that supports a number of threatened and endangered plants endemic to the area, including:

- Pittosporum ellipticum subsp. serpentinum
- Hebe brevifolia
- Hebe ligustrifolia
- Helichrysum aggregatum
- Leucopogon xerampelinus
- Pimelea tomentosa (sand daphne)
- Phyllocladus trichomanoides (tanekaha)
- Pseudopanax lessonii (coastal fivefinger)
- Uncinia perplexa (Surville Cliffs bastard grass)
