= Pukepoto =

- Interactive map of Pukepoto
- Coordinates: 35°9′25″S 173°13′24″E
- Country: New Zealand
- Region: Northland Region
- District: Far North District
- Ward: Te Hiku
- Community: Te Hiku
- Subdivision: Kaitāia
- Electorates: Northland; Te Tai Tokerau

Government
  - Territorial Authority: Far North District Council
  - Regional council: Northland Regional Council
  - Mayor of Far North: Moko Tepania
  - Northland MP: Grant McCallum
  - Te Tai Tokerau MP: Mariameno Kapa-Kingi

Area
  - Total: 14.08 km^{2} (5.44 sq mi)

Population (2023)
  - Total: 174
  - Density: 12.4/km^{2} (32.0/sq mi)

Pukepoto is a town in Northland, New Zealand. It lies south west of Kaitaia and north east of Ahipara.

Pukepoto is a cobalt blue pigment which can be found in clay rock.

== Demographics ==
Pukepoto is in an SA1 statistical area which covers 14.08 km^{2} (5.44 sq mi). The SA1 area is part of the larger Tangonge statistical area.

Historical population
Year	Pop.	±% p.a.
2006	150	—
2013	138	−1.18%
2018	165	+3.64%
2023	174	+1.07%

The SA1 statistical area had a population of 174 in the 2023 New Zealand census, an increase of 9 people (5.5%) since the 2018 census, and an increase of 36 people (26.1%) since the 2013 census. There were 84 males, and 87 females in 60 dwellings. The median age was 35.0 years (compared with 38.1 years nationally). There were 48 people (27.6%) aged under 15 years, 24 (13.8%) aged 15 to 29, 84 (48.3%) aged 30 to 64, and 18 (10.3%) aged 65 or older.

People could identify as more than one ethnicity. The results were 36.2% European (Pākehā), 91.4% Māori, 5.2% Pasifika, and 1.7% Asian. English was spoken by 94.8%, Māori language by 27.6%, and other languages by 1.7%. No language could be spoken by 5.2% (e.g. too young to talk). The percentage of people born overseas was 1.7, compared with 28.8% nationally.

Religious affiliations were 24.1% Christian, 24.1% Māori religious beliefs, and 0.0% other religions. People who answered that they had no religion were 48.3%, and 5.2% of people did not answer the census question.

Of those at least 15 years old, 9 (7.1%) people had a bachelor's or higher degree, 69 (54.8%) had a post-high school certificate or diploma, and 39 (31.0%) people exclusively held high school qualifications. The median income was $30,400, compared with $41,500 nationally. 3 people (2.4%) earned over $100,000 compared to 12.1% nationally. The employment status of those at least 15 was that 48 (38.1%) people were employed full-time, 12 (9.5%) were part-time, and 12 (9.5%) were unemployed.

=== Tangonge statistical area ===
Tangonge covers 177.18 km^{2} (68.41 sq mi) and had an estimated population of 1,400 as of June 2025, with a population density of 7.9 people per km^{2}.

Historical population for Tangonge
Year	Pop.	±% p.a.
2006	1,041	—
2013	1,131	+1.19%
2018	1,134	+0.05%
2023	1,332	+3.27%

Tangonge had a population of 1,332 in the 2023 New Zealand census, an increase of 198 people (17.5%) since the 2018 census, and an increase of 201 people (17.8%) since the 2013 census. There were 669 males, 660 females and 3 people of other genders in 453 dwellings. 1.1% of people identified as LGBTIQ+. The median age was 37.9 years (compared with 38.1 years nationally). There were 309 people (23.2%) aged under 15 years, 228 (17.1%) aged 15 to 29, 576 (43.2%) aged 30 to 64, and 219 (16.4%) aged 65 or older.

People could identify as more than one ethnicity. The results were 58.6% European (Pākehā); 65.8% Māori; 6.1% Pasifika; 1.6% Asian; 0.2% Middle Eastern, Latin American and African New Zealanders (MELAA); and 2.0% other, which includes people giving their ethnicity as "New Zealander". English was spoken by 96.4%, Māori language by 16.9%, Samoan by 0.5% and other languages by 2.7%. No language could be spoken by 2.7% (e.g. too young to talk). New Zealand Sign Language was known by 0.5%. The percentage of people born overseas was 7.9, compared with 28.8% nationally.

Religious affiliations were 39.2% Christian, 0.2% Hindu, 12.4% Māori religious beliefs, 0.7% New Age, 0.2% Jewish, and 0.5% other religions. People who answered that they had no religion were 41.0%, and 6.5% of people did not answer the census question.

Of those at least 15 years old, 93 (9.1%) people had a bachelor's or higher degree, 618 (60.4%) had a post-high school certificate or diploma, and 285 (27.9%) people exclusively held high school qualifications. The median income was $29,800, compared with $41,500 nationally. 60 people (5.9%) earned over $100,000 compared to 12.1% nationally. The employment status of those at least 15 was that 435 (42.5%) people were employed full-time, 144 (14.1%) were part-time, and 54 (5.3%) were unemployed.

== Marae ==
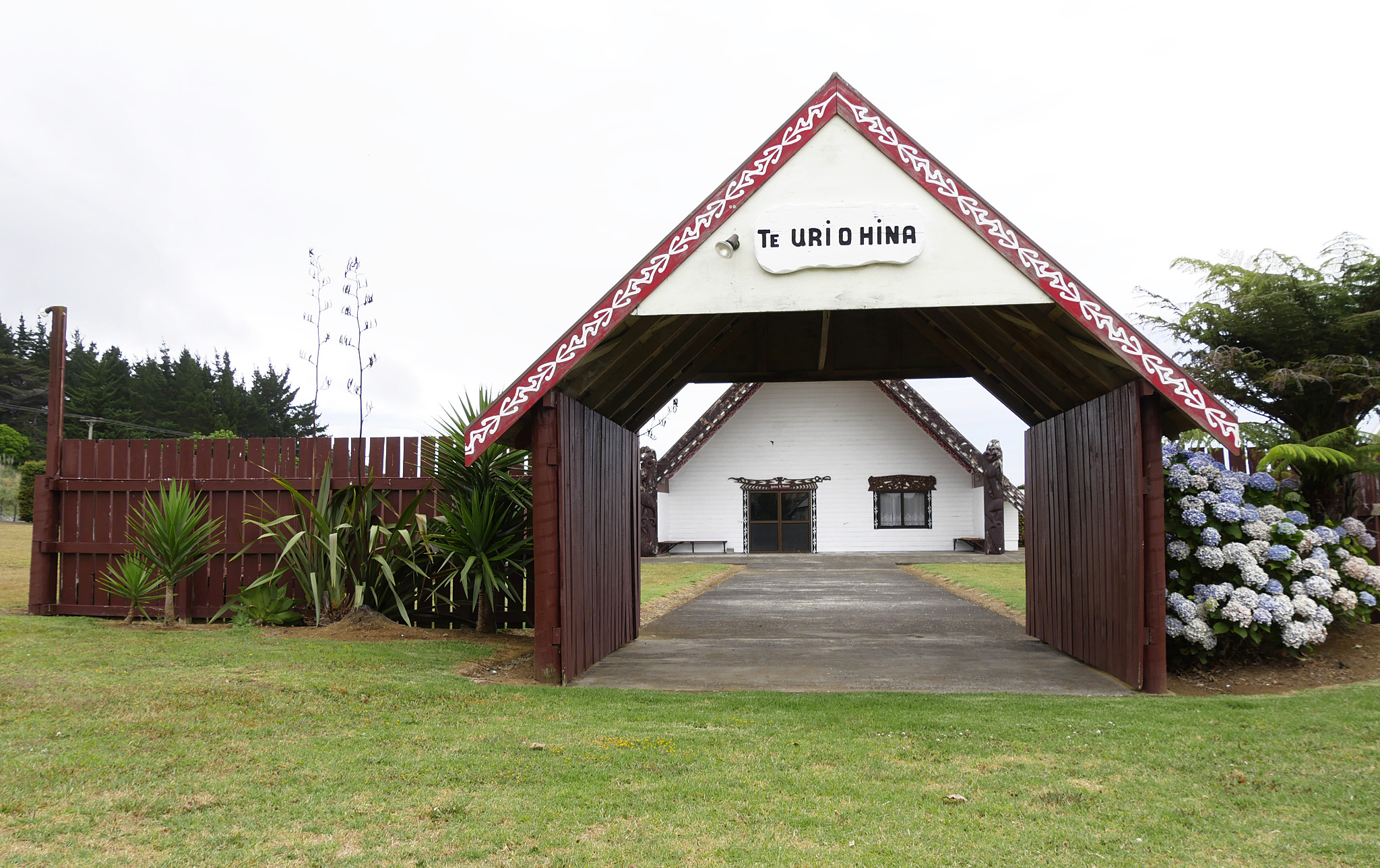
Te Uri o Hina Marae (Entrance)

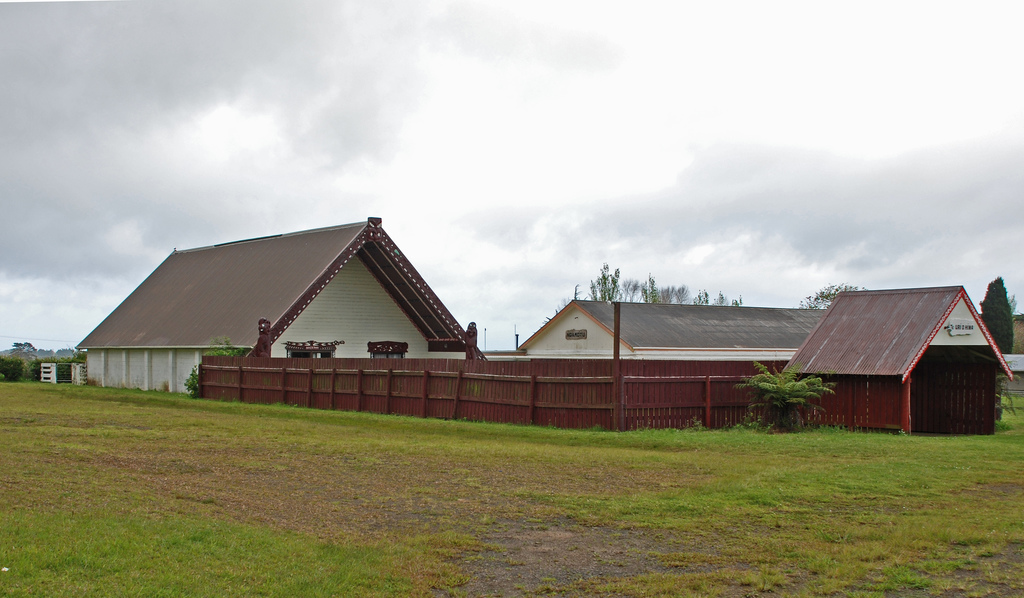
Te Uri o Hina Marae

Pukepoto has two marae connected with the iwi (tribe) of Te Rarawa, maunga (mountain) of Taumatamahoe and repo/wai (water/wetland) of Tāngonge. Descendants of these marae identify with the ancestors Tumoana (captain of the Tinana waka), Tarutaru (who consolidated iwi Te Rarawa to revenge the death of Te Ripo), and Ngamotu (the daughter of Tarutaru).

Te Rarawa Marae and meeting house are affiliated with the hapū of Ngāti Te Ao and Te Uri o Hina.

Te Uri o Hina Marae and Hohourongo meeting house are affiliated with the hapū of Ngāti Te Ao, Tahāwai and Te Uri o Hina.

In October 2020, the Government committed $1,407,731 from the Provincial Growth Fund to upgrade Te Rarawa Marae, Te Uri o Hina Marae, and 7 other marae of Te Rarawa, creating 100 jobs.

== Education ==
Pukepoto School is a contributing primary (years 1–6) school with a roll of 26 as of July 2026. It may have started as a mission school in 1866.
