= Ngā-kahu-whero =

New Zealand Te Rarawa founding mother

Ngā-kahu-whero (–1836?) was a New Zealand Te Rarawa founding mother. Ngā-kahu-whero, also known as Herepaenga, was born at Waihou, in the late eighteenth century. She was a ruling chief of the Te Rarawa from circa 1800 until her death. She participated in the Battle of Waitukupahau, the Battle of d Te Oneroa-a-Tohe and the Battle of Moetara in 1833. She was buried at Papanui on Pukekōwhai, together with other descendants of Te Rēinga.
