= Northland Peninsula =

Peninsula in New Zealand

Coordinates: 35.387°S 173.810°E

1953 map of the North Auckland peninsula

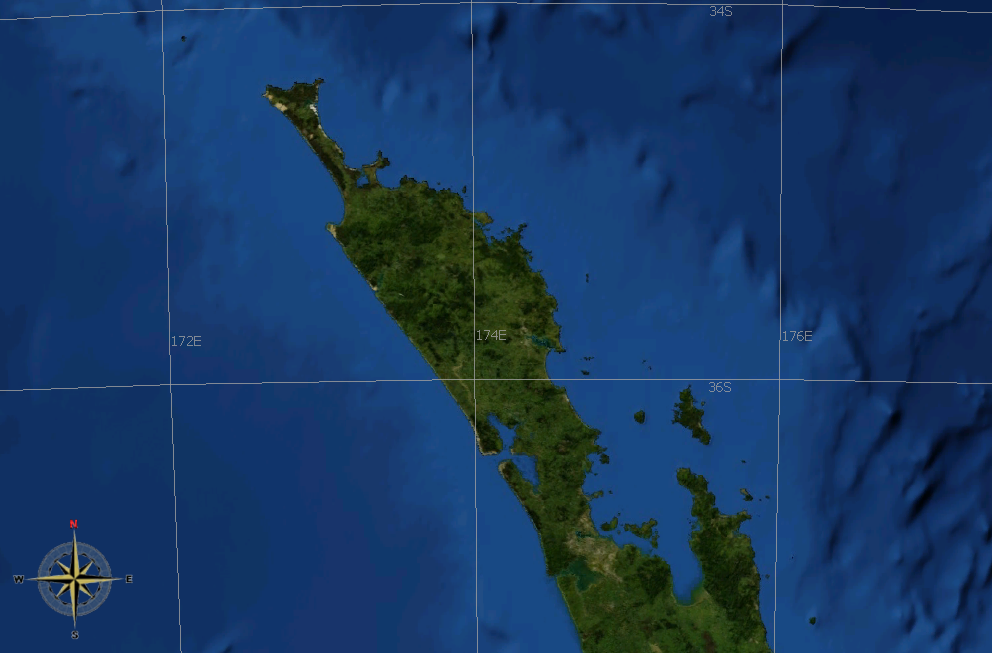
The Northland Peninsula stretches from the Auckland isthmus to the northern tip of New Zealand's North Island.

The Northland Peninsula, also known as the North Auckland Peninsula, is in the northern part of the North Island of New Zealand. It is joined to the rest of the island by the Auckland isthmus, a narrow piece of land between the Waitematā Harbour and the Manukau Harbour in the middle of the Auckland metropolitan area. The peninsula is not conterminous with the local government area of Northland Region, which occupies the northern 80% of the peninsula, as the southern section is administratively part of the Auckland Region.

== Geology ==
The peninsula formed as an island 22 million years ago, when it was uplifted by interaction between the Pacific Plate and Australian Plate. Between 25 and 22 million years ago, Northland and the East Cape were adjacent, with the East Cape moving south-east due to tectonic forces. Much of Northland is an allochthon, a large block of land formed elsewhere and moved to its current position. When Northland was uplifted, the sea floor over the central Auckland Region was pushed down to depths of 2,000 to 3,000 metres. The Waitemata Group sedimentary rock found in the Northland and Auckland regions is material that was eroded from the Northland island and deposited on the deep sea floor.

== Geography ==
The peninsula stretches northwest for about 330 kilometres from the Auckland isthmus (or Tamaki isthmus), reaching a maximum width of 85 kilometres. It has a convoluted coastline, with many smaller peninsulas branching off it.

The northernmost 100 kilometres of the Northland Peninsula forms the Aupōuri Peninsula – a peninsula on a peninsula – narrowing to only some 10 kilometres in width. At its northern end, the Aupōuri Peninsula includes a number of capes: Cape Maria van Diemen, Cape Reinga / Te Rerenga Wairua, North Cape / Otou, and the Hikurua / de Surville Cliffs, the northernmost point, at latitude 34° 23' 47" South.

The Kaipara Harbour, part way along the peninsula's western (Tasman Sea) shore, is one of the largest harbours in the world, stretching some 65 kilometres from north to south. Further north is the smaller Hokianga harbour, which has historic and cultural significance, especially to the Māori people. On the eastern coast, another historically significant site is Waitangi and the surrounding Bay of Islands. This was a major settlement area in early colonial New Zealand, and was the site of the first signing (February 1840) of the Treaty of Waitangi, which is seen in the national mythos as the founding document of New Zealand's nationhood.

The largest settlement on the peninsula (other than parts of the Auckland conurbation) is Whangārei, on a harbour opening on the Pacific Ocean close to the peninsula's widest point.
