= Great Exhibition Bay =

Embayment in New Zealand

- Tokerau (Māori)
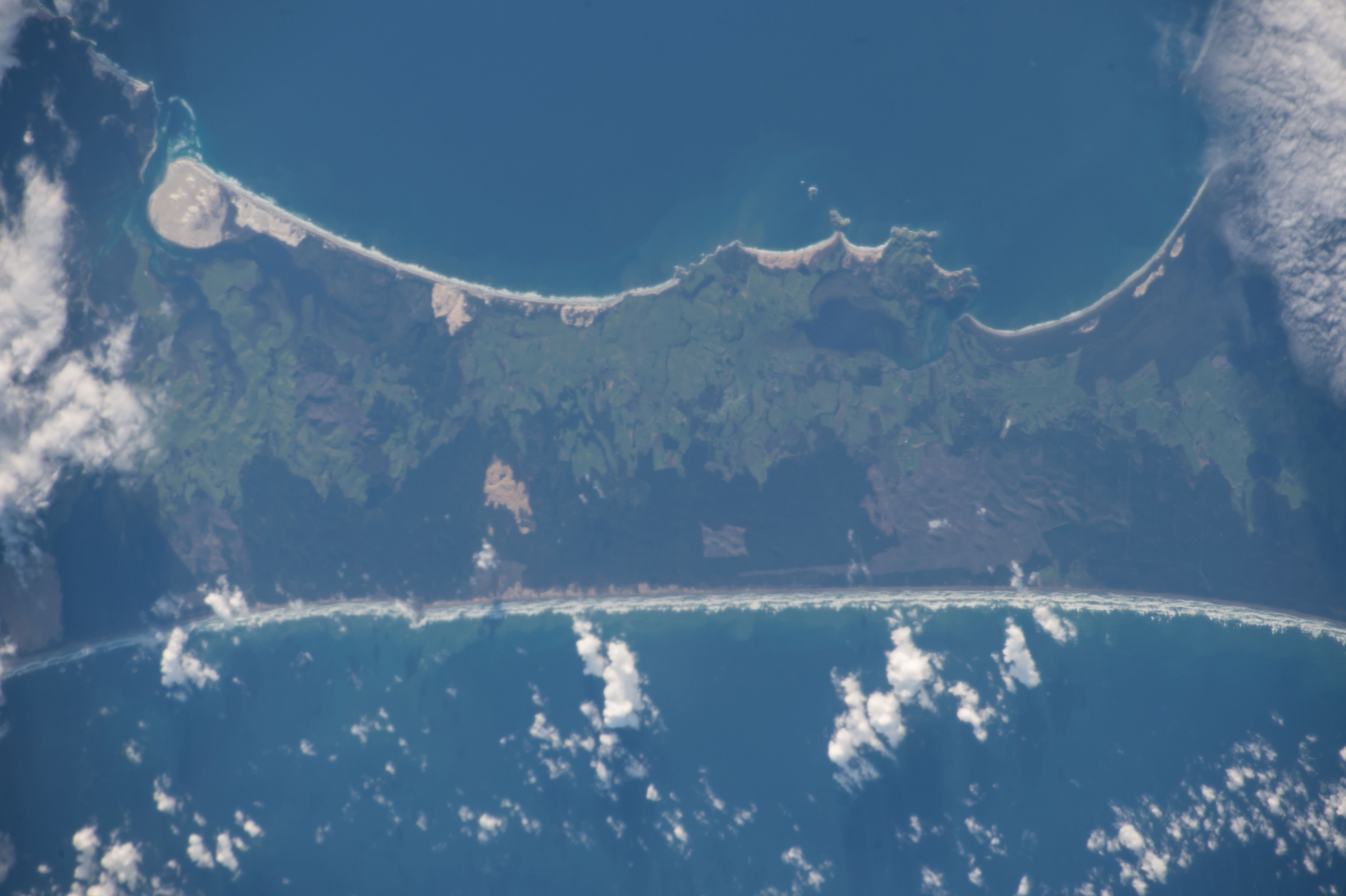
- Satellite image looking across the Aupōuri Peninsula (east is at top). Great Exhibition Bay is the wide bay to the top left.

- Location of Great Exhibition Bay in New Zealand
- Location: Aupōuri Peninsula, Northland
- Coordinates: 34°38′S 173°00′E
- Type: Bay
- Etymology: Named for the 1851 Great Exhibition
- Primary inflows: Parengarenga Harbour

Great Exhibition Bay (Māori: Tokerau) is a 35-kilometre (22 mi) wide embayment close to the northern tip of New Zealand's North Island. It lies on the east coast of the Aupōuri Peninsula in the Northland Region. The large natural inlet of Parengarenga Harbour lies at the northern end of the bay, and the southern extremity is Henderson Point, at the northern end of Henderson Bay.

The bay was called Sandy Bay by Captain James Cook, but was renamed in commemoration of the 1851 Great Exhibition, though the reasons for this renaming are not clear. The Māori name for the bay, Tokerau, simply means "north".
