= Ahipara =

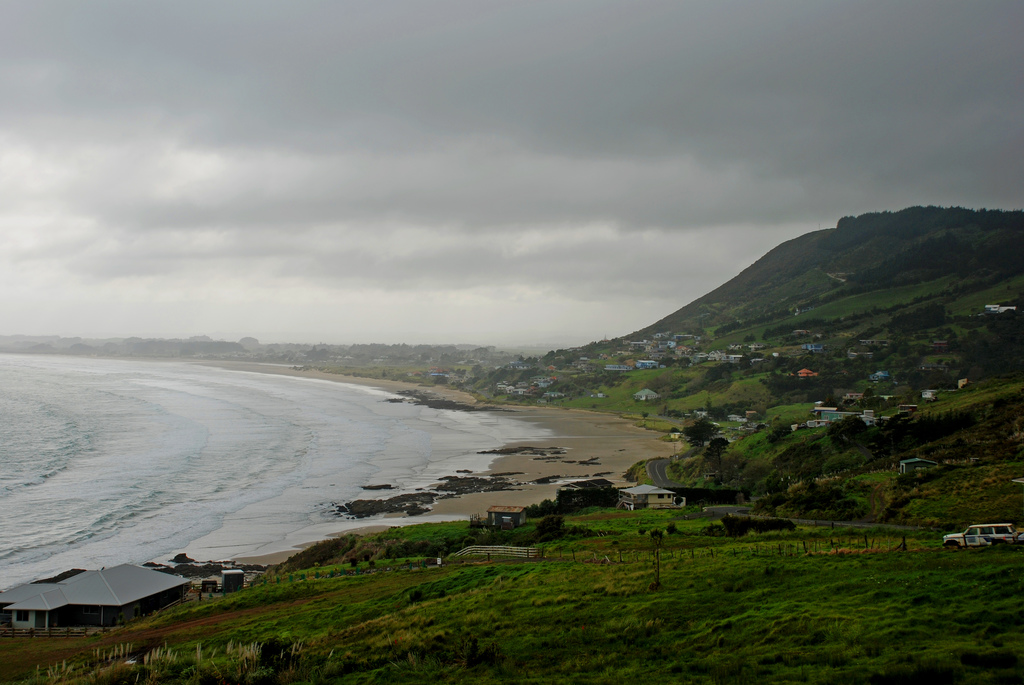
- Ahipara Bay with Whangatauatia Maunga to the right
- Interactive map of Ahipara
- Coordinates: 35°10′17″S 173°9′12″E
- Country: New Zealand
- Region: Northland Region
- District: Far North District
- Ward: Te Hiku
- Community: Te Hiku
- Subdivision: Kaitāia
- Electorates: Northland; Te Tai Tokerau

Government
  - Territorial Authority: Far North District Council
  - Regional council: Northland Regional Council
  - Mayor of Far North: Moko Tepania
  - Northland MP: Grant McCallum
  - Te Tai Tokerau MP: TBD

Area
  - Total: 4.53 km^{2} (1.75 sq mi)

Population (June 2025)
  - Total: 1,280
  - Density: 283/km^{2} (732/sq mi)
- Postcode: 0481

Ahipara is a town and locality in Northland, New Zealand at the southern end of Ninety Mile Beach, with the Tauroa Peninsula to the west. Ahipara Bay is to the north west. Kaitaia is 14 km to the north east, and Pukepoto is between the two.

== History ==
=== Pre-European settlement ===
The name comes from the Māori language words ahi, meaning fire, and para, a large fern, and can be translated as "a fire at which para was cooked". Prior to the late 18th century, the area was called Wharo, which means "stretched out". That name originated when the chief Tohe ordered a slave to measure the distance the tide had receded, by counting the number of arm-spans from the high water level.

=== European settlement ===
The area was popular with kauri gum-diggers during the late 19th and early 20th centuries. By the 1910s, the kauri gum industry became centred around Ahipara and Houhora. Digging peaked at Ahipara in the 1920s and 1930s, and the area was one of the last places in New Zealand where kauri gum was dug on a widescale. The Ahipara Gumfields Historic Reserve is to the south of the town.

Shipwreck Bay (Te Kōhanga in Māori), at the southern point of Ahipara Bay, contains a number of wrecks visible at low tide.

Ahipara Bay was once well known for its toheroa shellfish, but gathering these is restricted due to their near-extinction.

=== 21st century ===
In February 2019, a fire occurred early morning in Ahipara near Shipwreck Bay (Te Kohanga). Fire alarms were raised at 1:24am evacuating six homes on Gumfields Road.

In early October 2020, another fire occurred in Ahipara near the southern end of Ninety Beach, causing the evacuation of four homes on 4 October.

== Demographics ==
Ahipara covers 4.53 km^{2} (1.75 sq mi) and had an estimated population of 1,280 as of June 2025, with a population density of 283 people per km^{2}.

Historical population
Year	Pop.	±% p.a.
2006	1,095	—
2013	1,032	−0.84%
2018	1,230	+3.57%
2023	1,272	+0.67%

Ahipara had a population of 1,272 in the 2023 New Zealand census, an increase of 42 people (3.4%) since the 2018 census, and an increase of 240 people (23.3%) since the 2013 census. There were 591 males, 675 females and 6 people of other genders in 504 dwellings. 2.4% of people identified as LGBTIQ+. The median age was 45.2 years (compared with 38.1 years nationally). There were 255 people (20.0%) aged under 15 years, 177 (13.9%) aged 15 to 29, 564 (44.3%) aged 30 to 64, and 276 (21.7%) aged 65 or older.

People could identify as more than one ethnicity. The results were 59.0% European (Pākehā), 61.8% Māori, 7.1% Pasifika, 2.1% Asian, and 0.9% other, which includes people giving their ethnicity as "New Zealander". English was spoken by 97.4%, Māori language by 17.9%, and other languages by 5.9%. No language could be spoken by 1.9% (e.g. too young to talk). New Zealand Sign Language was known by 0.5%. The percentage of people born overseas was 12.0, compared with 28.8% nationally.

Religious affiliations were 38.2% Christian, 0.5% Hindu, 7.3% Māori religious beliefs, 0.9% Buddhist, and 0.9% other religions. People who answered that they had no religion were 46.0%, and 6.8% of people did not answer the census question.

Of those at least 15 years old, 141 (13.9%) people had a bachelor's or higher degree, 555 (54.6%) had a post-high school certificate or diploma, and 279 (27.4%) people exclusively held high school qualifications. The median income was $32,900, compared with $41,500 nationally. 63 people (6.2%) earned over $100,000 compared to 12.1% nationally. The employment status of those at least 15 was that 420 (41.3%) people were employed full-time, 150 (14.7%) were part-time, and 54 (5.3%) were unemployed.

== Iwi, Marae & Hapū ==
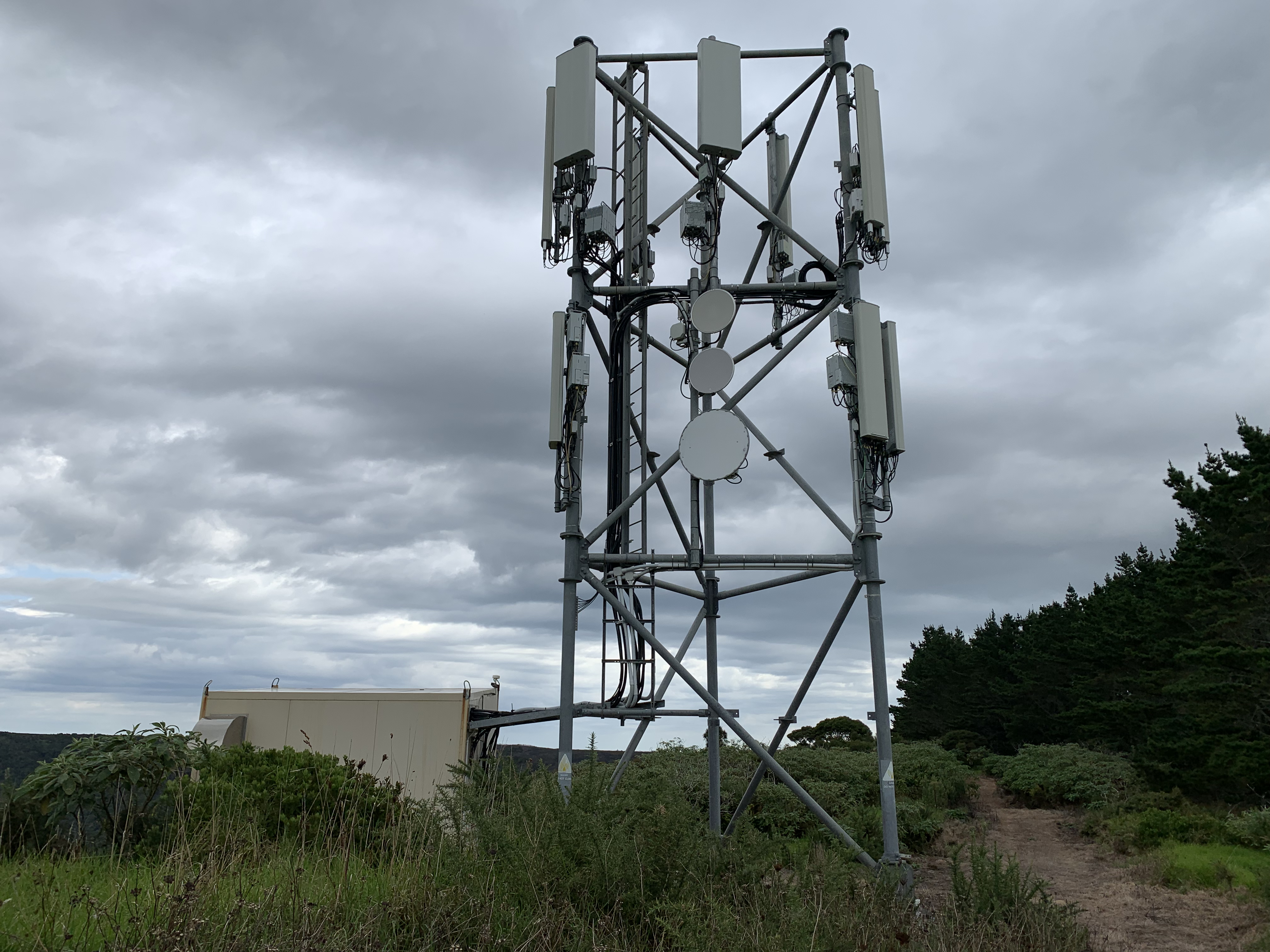
A communications tower that stands at the peak of Whangatauatia Maunga, along with a maintenance room to the left

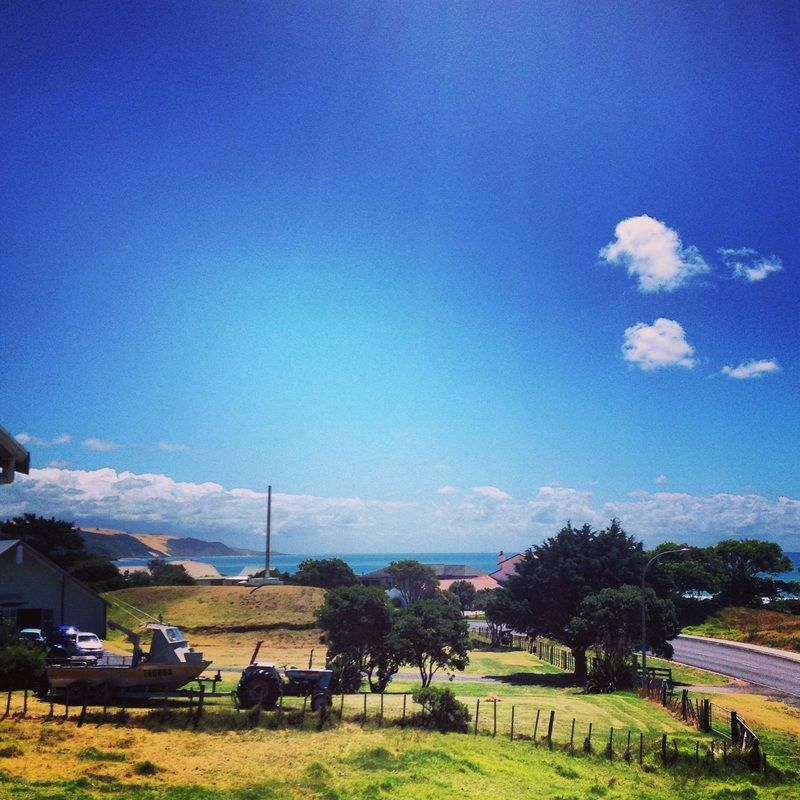
Korou Kore Marae – located at the base of Whangatauatia Maunga, overlooking Te-Oneroa-a-Tōhē

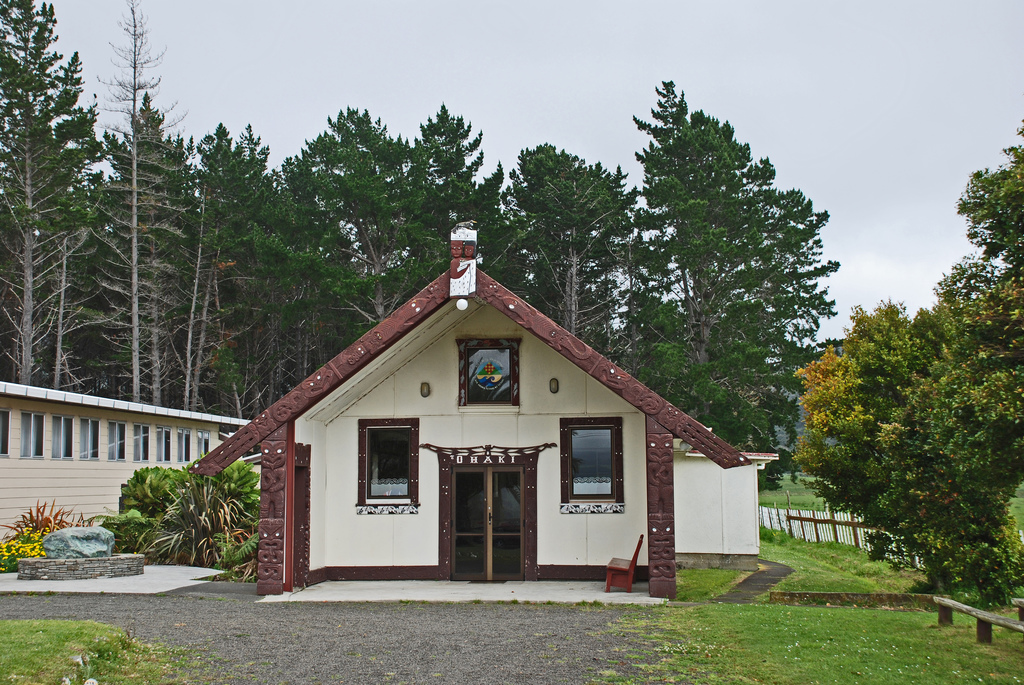
Te Ohaki Wharenui, Roma marae

Ahipara is located within the rohe (tribal area) of Te Rarawa, and has strong affiliations to the iwi.

Ahipara hosts two marae affiliated with Te Rarawa hapū:

- Korou Kore Marae: Affiliated with the hapū Ngāti Moroki. The whare tūpuna is also named Ngāti Moroki.
- Roma Marae: Affiliated with four hapū: Ngāti Pākahi, Ngāti Waiora, Parewhero and Te Patukirikiri. The whare tūpuna is named Te Ōhākī. In October 2020, the Government committed $1,407,731 from the Provincial Growth Fund to upgrade Roma Marae and 8 other marae of Te Rarawa, creating 100 jobs.

== Recreation ==
Ahipara and Shipwreck Bays are popular surfing spots. The area featured in the 1966 surf movie The Endless Summer. Shipwreck Bay has been reported as one of the best left hand surf breaks in the world.

Ahipara is on the walking trail Te Araroa.

== Education ==
Ahipara School is a coeducational full primary (years 1–8) school with a decile rating of 3 and a roll of 227. It was founded in 1872 as a mission school, and moved to its present site in 1901.

Ahipara Sandhoppers Early Childhood Centre has been operating on the grounds of the Ahipara School since at least the mid-1990s. Ahipara Sandhoppers has received recognition for their environmental initiatives.

== Environment ==
Ahipara has a number of coastal care groups, including the Ahipara Komiti Takutaimoana (for present and future sustainable use and protection of the Kaimoana/seafood) and Ahipara Community CoastCare (protection and restoration of the dune environment).
