= Te Rarawa =

Māori iwi (tribe) in Aotearoa New Zealand

- Iwi (tribe) in Māoridom
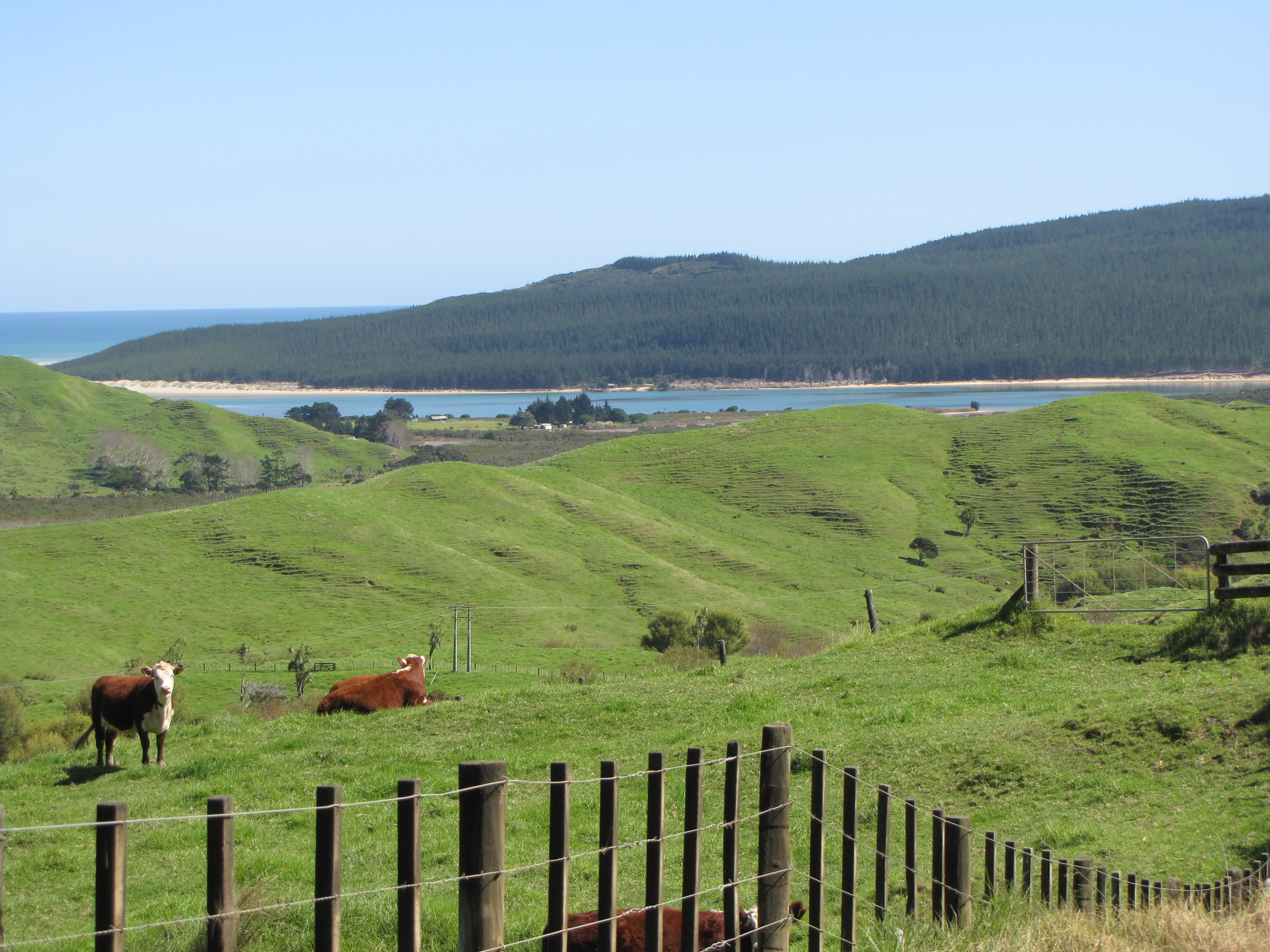
- Herekino Harbour

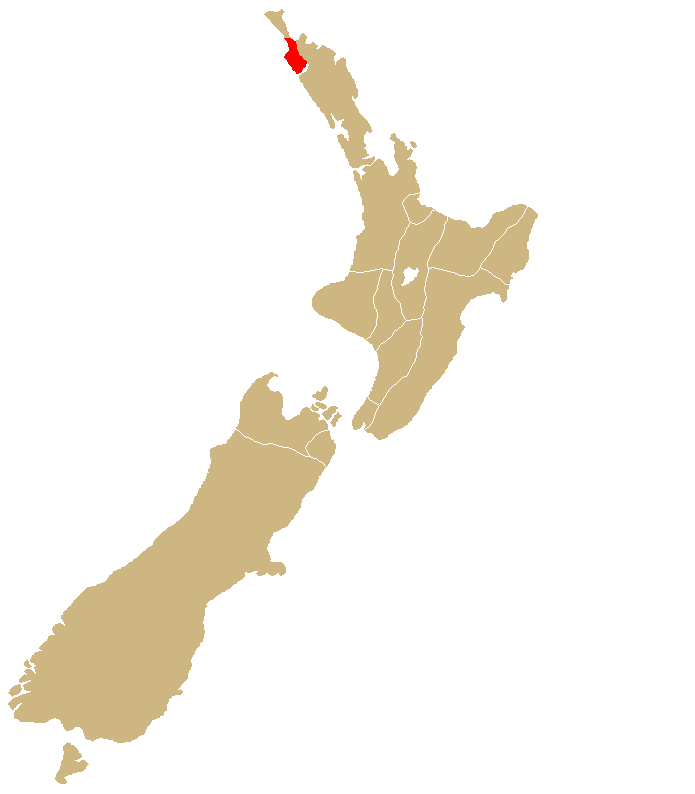
- Rohe (region): Northland
- Waka (canoe): Tinana, Māhuhu-ki-te-rangi, Māmari, Ngātokimatawhaorua
- Website: http://www.terarawa.co.nz/

Te Rarawa is a Māori iwi of Northland, New Zealand. The iwi is one of six Muriwhenua iwi of the far north of the North Island.

== Rūnanga and marae ==
Te Rarawa has 23 foundation marae:

- Korou Kore Marae, Ahipara, represents the hapū of Ngāti Moroki.
- Mātihetihe Marae, Mitimiti, represents the hapū of Te Tao Māui and Te Hokokeha.
- Morehu Marae, Ōhaki Marae and Taiao Marae, Whāngāpe Harbour, represent the hapū of Te Uri o Tai.
- Motutī Marae, Hokianga Harbour, represents the hapū of Ngāti Te Maara, Te Kaitutae, Ngāī Tamatea, Te Waiariki, and Ngāti Muri Kāhara.
- Ngāti Manawa Marae, Panguru, represents the hapū of Ngāti Manawa, Waiāriki and Te Kaitutae.
- Ōwhata Marae, Ōwhata Harbour, represents the hapū of Ngāti Torotoroa, Tahukai and Te Popoto.
- Ngāi Tūpoto Marae, Motukaraka, represents the hapū of Ngāi Tūpoto and Ngāti Here.
- Rangikohu Marae, Ōwhata Harbour, represents the hapū of Ngāti Kuri rāua ko Ngāti Wairupe and Te Aupōuri.
- Roma Marae, Ahipara, represents the hapū of Ngāti Waiora, Ngāti Pākahi, Te Patukirikiri, and Parewhero.
- Tauteihiihi Marae and Pikipāria Marae, Kohukohu, and Pāteoro Marae, Te Karae, represent the hapū of Ihutai.
- Te Arohanui Marae, Mangataipa, represents Kohatutaka.
- Te Kotahitanga Marae, Whāngāpe Harbour, represents the hapū of Ngāti Haua.
- Te Uri o Hina Marae and Te Rarawa Marae, Pukepoto, represent the hapū of Ngāti Te Ao, Tahāwai, and Te Uri o Hina.
- Waihou Marae, Hokianga Harbour, represents the hapū of Ngāti Te Reinga.
- Wainui Marae, Ahipara, represents the hapū of Ngāti Moetonga and Te Rokekā.
- Waiparera Marae, Rangi Point, represents the hapū of Patutoka.
- Waipuna Marae, Panguru, represents the hapū of Te Kaitutae and Waiāriki.
- Whakamaharatanga Marae, Manukau district, represents the hapū of Ngāti Hine and Patupīnaki.

Each marae elects a representative who acts on their behalf on the Rūnanga. The main role of the Rūnanga is to receive, hold, manage, and administer funds for the benefit of all iwi members, to ensure communication between all marae and the Rūnanga, and to hold the CEO accountable

== Media ==
Te Reo Irirangi o Te Hiku o Te Ika, an iwi radio station, serves Te Rarawa and other Muriwhenua tribes of the Far North. It broadcasts a main station on 97.1 FM, an urban contemporary station Sunshine FM on 104.3 FM and a youth-oriented station Tai FM.

== Notable people ==
- Hector Busby, navigator and waka (canoe or ship) builder
- Dame Whina Cooper, woman of mana, kuia, teacher, storekeeper and community leader
- Dr Jenny Te Paa Daniel, public theologian and the first lay woman appointed to head an Anglican theological college in the Anglican Communion
- Makarena Dudley, psychologist, lecturer at the University of Auckland and dementia researcher
- Ralph Hotere, artist from Mitimiti
- Josh Ioane, rugby player for The All Blacks, and Highlanders
- Māmari Stephens, Senior Lecturer at the Victoria University of Wellington, compiled the first Māori legal dictionary
- Meri Te Tai Mangakāhia, Māori suffragist
- Ānaru Iehu Ngāwaka, leader and Anglican clergyman
- Ngahuia Piripi, television and film actress
- Ngā-kahu-whero, Te Rarawa founding mother and a ruling chief
- Dr. Papaarangi Mary-Jane Reid, Professor and Head of Department of Māori Health at the Faculty of Medical and Health Sciences at the University of Auckland
- Haimona "Simon" Snowden, respected kaumātua, orator and waiata composer
- Ngāwini Yates, a storekeeper, businesswoman and farmer in the later part of the 19th century
- Grace Roffé, Wellington Free Ambulance Senior Emergency Medical Dispatcher and single mother of 10 orphan babies.
