= List of iwi =

Iwi of New Zealand

This is a list of iwi (New Zealand Māori tribes).

== List of iwi ==
This list includes groups recognised as iwi (tribes) in certain contexts. Many are also hapū (sub-tribes) of larger iwi.

Moriori are included on this list. Although they are distinct from the Māori people, they have common ancestry with them.

Name	Regions of rohe (tribal area)	Waka (canoe)	2001 population	2006 population	2013 population	2018 population	2023 population
Ahuriri (part of Ngāti Kahungunu)	Hawke's Bay	Tākitimu	n/a	n/a	n/a	n/a	n/a
Heretaunga Tamatea (grouping)	Hawke's Bay	Tākitimu	n/a	n/a	n/a	n/a	n/a
Kāti Māmoe	Canterbury, Otago, Southland, West Coast, Marlborough, Tasman	Tākitimu	2,262	2,880	3,111	3,792	7,989
Maungaharuru Tangitū (part of Ngāti Kahungunu)	Hawke's Bay	Tākitimu	n/a	n/a	n/a	180	1,464
Moriori	Chatham Islands	Unknown	585	942	738	996	1,806
Muaūpoko	Manawatū-Whanganui, Wellington	Kurahaupō	1,836	2,499	2,694	3,375	4,563
Ngā Pōtiki / Ngā Pōtiki ā Tamapahore	Bay of Plenty	Mātaatua, Tainui	n/a	n/a	n/a	249	1,950
Ngā Rauru	Taranaki, Manawatū-Whanganui	Te Rangiuamutu, Aotea, Motumotuahi, Pangatoru, Te Kōhatuwhenua, Te Rangiuamutu / Tairea, Te Wakaringaringa	3,090	4,047	4,179	5,568	7,323
Ngā Wairiki Ngāti Apa	Manawatū-Whanganui	Kurahaupō	1,458	2,385	2,970	4,131	5,148
Ngāi Tahu / Kāi Tahu	Canterbury, Otago, Southland, West Coast, Marlborough, Tasman	Tākitimu, Arahura, Āraiteuru	39,180	49,185	54,819	74,082	84,969
Ngāi Tai ki Tāmaki	Auckland, Waikato	Tainui	177	339	498	693	1,800
Ngāi Takoto	Northland	Kurahaupō	489	771	1,113	1,680	3,273
Ngāi Tāmanuhiri	Gisborne	Takitimu, Horouta	1,173	1,662	1,719	2,163	3,609
Ngāi Te Ohuake	Hawke's Bay, Manawatū-Whanganui	Tākitimu	n/a	n/a	n/a	171	402
Ngāi Te Rangi	Bay of Plenty	Mātaatua	9,561	12,198	12,924	17,205	22,047
Ngāitai	Bay of Plenty	Tainui	2,022	2,313	2,301	2,805	3,717
Ngāpuhi / Ngāti Kahu ki Whaingaroa (part of Ngāpuhi and Ngāti Kahu)	Northland	Tinana	1,965	1,746	2,049	4,740	9,006
Ngāpuhi	Northland	Māmari, Ngātokimatawhaorua, Māhūhū, Ruakaramea, Tainui, Matawhaorua, Mātaatua, Matahourua	102,981	122,214	125,601	165,201	184,470
Ngāruahine	Taranaki	Aotea	3,228	3,723	4,80	6,678	9,639
Ngāti Apa ki te Rā Tō	Tasman, Nelson, West Coast, Marlborough	Kurahaupō	375	741	846	1,197	2,184
Ngāti Awa	Bay of Plenty	Mātaatua	13,044	15,258	16,182	21,486	24,999
Ngāti Hako	Auckland, Waikato, Bay of Plenty	Unknown	924	1,377	1,392	1,929	2,928
Ngāti Hāua	Manawatū-Whanganui	Tainui	618	819	867	1,299	2,202
Ngāti Hauā	Waikato	Tainui	3,840	4,923	5,598	7,275	12,564
Ngāti Hauiti	Manawatū-Whanganui	Tākitimu	1,002	1,038	1,029	1,407	2,034
Ngāti Hei	Waikato	Arawa	363	558	513	630	936
Ngāti Hikairo (part of Waikato-Tainui)	Waikato	Tainui	n/a	n/a	n/a	1,845	3,870
Ngāti Hinerangi	Waikato, Bay of Plenty	Unknown	n/a	n/a	n/a	n/a	1,092
Ngāti Hineuru	Hawke's Bay, Waikato	Tākitimu	n/a	n/a	n/a	390	1,236
Ngāti Hine (part of Ngāpuhi) / Ngati Hau	Northland	Māmari, Ngātokimatawhaorua, Māhūhū, Ruakaramea, Tainui, Matawhaorua	n/a	n/a	n/a	9,384	17,853
Ngāti Kahu	Northland	Mamaru	6,957	8,313	8,580	11,577	14,982
Ngāti Kahu ki Whangaroa (part of Ngāti Kahu)	Northland	Mamaru	n/a	n/a	n/a	n/a	2,988
Ngāti Kahungunu	Hawke's Bay, Wellington, Waikato	Tākitimu	29,244	40,764	43,515	62,967	95,751
Ngāti Kahungunu ki Heretaunga (part of Ngāti Kahungunu)	Hawke's Bay, Waikato	Tākitimu	6,912	9,525	10,902	21,318	27,984
Ngāti Kahungunu ki Tamakinui a Rua (part of Ngāti Kahungunu)	Hawke's Bay, Waikato	Tākitimu	249	423	528	1,077	2,772
Ngāti Kahungunu ki Tamatea (part of Ngāti Kahungunu)	Hawke's Bay, Waikato	Tākitimu	588	720	744	1,902	3,396
Ngāti Kahungunu ki Te Whanganui-a-Orotu (part of Ngāti Kahungunu)	Hawke's Bay, Waikato	Tākitimu	1,704	1,674	1,905	2,130	2,436
Ngāti Kahungunu ki Te Wairoa (part of Ngāti Kahungunu)	Hawke's Bay, Waikato	Tākitimu	14,661	20,982	21,060	25,026	29,187
Ngāti Kahungunu ki Wairarapa (part of Ngāti Kahungunu)	Wellington	Tākitimu	5,130	7,440	8,376	11,514	14,409
Ngāti Kauwhata	Manawatū-Whanganui	Tainui	n/a	n/a	1,401	1,734	2,679
Ngāti Kea / Ngāti Tuarā	Waikato, Bay of Plenty	Arawa	n/a	n/a	n/a	435	1,857
Ngāti Koata	Marlborough	Tainui	765	1,062	1,341	1,842	2,877
Ngāti Korokī Kahukura	Waikato	Tainui	n/a	n/a	n/a	1,500	3,585
Ngāti Kuia	Marlborough	Te Hoiere	1,224	1,551	1,794	2,745	3,963
Ngāti Kurī	Northland	Kurahaupō	4,647	5,754	6,492	8,994	12,480
Ngāti Mākino	Bay of Plenty	Arawa	n/a	n/a	n/a	591	1,938
Ngāti Manawa	Bay of Plenty	Mātaatua	1,542	1,941	2,253	2,928	3,561
Ngāti Maniapoto	Waikato, Manawatū-Whanganui, Taranaki	Tainui	27,168	33,627	35,361	45,930	56,856
Ngāti Manuhiri	Auckland	Moekākara, Tainui	n/a	n/a	n/a	297	588
Ngāti Maru (Hauraki)	Auckland, Waikato, Bay of Plenty	Aotea, Tokomaru, Tainui	2,604	3,372	3,765	5,331	6,528
Ngāti Maru (Taranaki) / Te Iwi o Maruwharanui	Taranaki, Manawatū-Whanganui	Aotea, Tokomaru, Tainui	600	735	85	1,608	2,559
Ngāti Mutunga	Taranaki	Tokomaru	2,019	3,480	4,155	6,159	8,295
Ngāti Mutunga (Taranaki) (part of Ngāti Mutunga)	Taranaki	Tokomaru	1,206	2,091	2,514	3,486	5,334
Ngāti Mutunga o Wharekauri (part of Ngāti Mutunga)	Chatham Islands	Tokomaru	813	1,389	1,641	2,271	2,961
Ngāti Pāhauwera	Hawke's Bay	Tākitimu	n/a	1,761	2,331	3,030	4,782
Ngāti Pāoa	Auckland, Waikato	Tainui	2,397	3,375	3,456	4,803	6,402
Ngāti Pikiao	Bay of Plenty	Arawa	5,022	7,389	8,001	9,264	17,196
Ngāti Porou ki Hauraki / Ngati Porou ki Harataunga ki Mataora	Waikato	Horouta	591	1,173	1,647	2,076	2,727
Ngāti Porou	Gisborne	Horouta, Nuku-tai-memeha, Nukutere	61,701	71,907	71,049	92,349	102,480
Ngāti Pūkenga ki Waiau	Waikato	Mātaatua	273	480	594	780	1,137
Ngāti Pūkenga	Bay of Plenty	Mātaatua	1,137	1,788	2,175	2,949	4,344
Ngāti Rāhiri Tumutumu	Waikato	Mātaatua	93	195	249	375	510
Ngāti Rākaipaaka	Hawke's Bay	Tākitimu	n/a	1,485	1,317	1,884	3,249
Ngāti Rangi	Manawatū-Whanganui	Matahourua	n/a	n/a	n/a	1,452	3,417
Ngāti Ranginui	Bay of Plenty	Tākitimu	6,120	7,644	8,967	11,967	14,928
Ngāti Rangiteaorere	Bay of Plenty	Arawa	177	456	435	456	1,890
Ngāti Rangitihi	Bay of Plenty	Arawa	1,041	1,536	2,298	2,469	5,622
Ngāti Rangiwewehi	Bay of Plenty	Arawa	1,551	2,349	2,835	3,021	6,474
Ngāti Rārua	West Coast, Marlborough	Tainui	699	954	981	1,380	2,151
Ngāti Raukawa	Waikato, Manawatū-Whanganui, Greater Wellington	Tainui	16,263	21,399	25,188	35,943	31,029
Raukawa (Waikato) (part of Ngāti Raukawa)	Waikato	Tainui	5,175	8,166	10,053	8,631	14,406
Ngāti Raukawa ki te Tonga (part of Ngāti Raukawa)	Manawatū-Whanganui, Greater Wellington	Tainui	11,088	13,233	15,135	22,854	25,020
Ngāti Rehua (part of Ngāti Wai)	Auckland	Māhuhu-ki-te-rangi, Ruakaramea	n/a	n/a	n/a	372	1,089
Ngāti Rongomai	Bay of Plenty	Arawa	n/a	n/a	n/a	606	2,289
Ngāti Ruanui	Taranaki	Kurahaupō, Tākitimu, Aotea, Te Rangiuamutu, Motumotuahi, Pangatoru, Te Kōhatuwhenua, Te Rangiuamutu / Tairea, Te Wakaringaringa	5,286	7,035	7,260	9,606	12,576
Ngāti Ruapani / Ngāti Ruapani ki Waikaremoana	Hawke's Bay	Tākitimu	n/a	n/a	n/a	930	1,662
Ngāti Tahu – Ngāti Whaoa	Waikato, Bay of Plenty	Arawa	1,209	1,488	1,638	2,463	3,420
Ngāi Tāhuhu	Auckland, Northland	Tūnui-ā-rangi	n/a	n/a	n/a	n/a	n/a
Ngāti Tama	Manawatū-Whanganui, Taranaki, Wellington, Tasman, Nelson, Marlborough	Tokomaru	2,040	1,758	1,932	3,192	4,190
Ngāti Tama ki Te Tau Ihu (part of Ngāti Tama)	Tasman, Nelson, Marlborough	Tokomaru	n/a	n/a	n/a	n/a	n/a
Ngāti Tama ki Te Upoko o Te Ika (part of Ngāti Tama)	Wellington	Tokomaru	n/a	207	219	258	543
Ngāti Tama Kopiri (part of Ngāti Tama)	Manawatū-Whanganui	Tokomaru	870	n/a	n/a	249	n/a
Ngāti Tama ki Taranaki (part of Ngāti Tama)	Taranaki	Tokomaru	777	1167	1,335	1,920	n/a
Ngāti Tama ki Te Waipounamu (part of Ngāti Tama)	Tasman, Nelson, Marlborough	Tokomaru	393	384	378	558	n/a
Ngāti Tamaoho (part of Waikato-Tainui)	Auckland, Waikato	Tainui	n/a	n/a	n/a	519	1,923
Ngāti Tamakōpiri	Manawatū-Whanganui, Waikato	Tākitimu	n/a	n/a	n/a	n/a	507
Ngāti Tamaterā	Auckland, Waikato, Bay of Plenty	Tainui	1,866	2,457	2,577	3,189	4,053
Ngāti Tara Tokanui	Waikato, Bay of Plenty	Tainui	330	492	540	834	1,242
Ngāti Tarāwhai	Bay of Plenty	Arawa	114	243	282	417	1,611
Ngāti Te Ata	Auckland	Te Wakatūwhenua, Moekākara, Tainui, Arawa	n/a	n/a	n/a	1,611	2,604
Ngāti Tiipa (part of Waikato-Tainui)	Waikato	Tainui	n/a	n/a	n/a	1,425	3,432
Ngāti Toarangatira	Wellington, Tasman, Nelson, Marlborough	Tainui	2,901	3,642	4,779	5,943	9,063
Ngāti Toarangatira ki Te Waipounamu (part of Ngāti Toarangatira)	Tasman, Nelson, Marlborough	Tainui	138	183	321	909	1,329
Ngāti Toarangatira ki Te Whanganui-a-Tara (part of Ngāti Toarangatira)	Wellington	Tainui	2,763	3,459	4,458	5,034	7,038
Ngāti Tukorehe	Manawatū-Whanganui	Tainui	n/a	n/a	n/a	792	1,500
Ngāti Tūmatakōkiri	Tasman, Nelson, Marlborough	Kurahaupō	n/a	n/a	n/a	n/a	n/a
Ngāti Tūrangitukua	Waikato, Bay of Plenty	Arawa	n/a	n/a	n/a	n/a	n/a
Ngāti Tūwharetoa	Waikato, Bay of Plenty	Arawa, Te Paepae-ki-Rarotonga, Tōtara-i-kāria	29,301	34,674	35,877	47,103	48,960
Ngāti Wai	Northland, Auckland	Māhuhu-ki-te-rangi, Ruakaramea	3,966	4,866	5,667	8,394	10,794
Ngāti Whakahemo	Bay of Plenty	Tākitimu, Te Arawa, Mātaatua	n/a	n/a	n/a	n/a	n/a
Ngāti Whakaue	Bay of Plenty	Arawa	5,061	7,311	8,340	8,775	19,152
Ngāti Whanaunga	Auckland, Waikato	Tainui	399	588	624	891	1,257
Ngāti Whare	Bay of Plenty	Arawa	690	1,281	1,254	1,533	2,085
Ngāti Whātua	Northland, Auckland	Māhuhu-ki-te-rangi	12,837	15,795	16,044	21,294	24,432
Ngāti Whātua o Kaipara (part of Ngāti Whātua)	Auckland	Māhuhu-ki-te-rangi	n/a	n/a	n/a	7,326	9,711
Ngāti Whātua Ōrākei (part of Ngāti Whātua)	Auckland	Māhuhu-ki-te-rangi	n/a	n/a	n/a	3,573	5,226
Ngāti Whitikaupeka (part of Ngāti Kahungunu)	Manawatū-Whanganui, Hawke's Bay	Tākitimu	n/a	n/a	n/a	519	1,008
Pakakohi	Taranaki	Kurahaupō, Tākitimu, Aotea, Te Rangiuamutu	408	324	351	438	777
Rangitāne	Manawatū-Whanganui, Hawke's Bay, Wellington, Marlborough, Nelson, Tasman	Kurahaupō	2,775	3,813	4,920	7,911	10,464
Rangitāne o Manawatū	Manawatū-Whanganui	Kurahaupō	822	1,281	1,488	2,364	2,874
Rangitāne o Te Matau-a-Māui	Hawke's Bay, Wellington	Kurahaupō	1,197	1,566	2,217	2,238	3,180
Rangitāne o Wairau	Marlborough, Nelson, Tasman	Kurahaupō	756	966	1,215	1,848	3,072
Rangitāne o Tamaki nui a Rua	Hawke's Bay	Kurahaupō	n/a	n/a	n/a	558	1,338
Rereahu (traditionally part of Ngāti Maniapoto)	Waikato	Tainui	n/a	n/a	n/a	1,206	2,700
Rongomaiwahine	Hawke's Bay, Gisborne	Kurahaupō, Tākitimu	2,322	4,254	4,473	5,931	8,007
Rongowhakaata	Gisborne	Tākitimu, Horouta	3,612	4,710	4,920	6,531	9,021
Tamahaki	Manawatū-Whanganui	Aotea	n/a	n/a	n/a	234	651
Tamakana	Manawatū-Whanganui	Aotea	n/a	n/a	n/a	111	462
Tangāhoe	Taranaki	Kurahaupō, Tākitimu, Aotea, Te Rangiuamutu	261	228	243	306	795
Tapuika	Bay of Plenty	Arawa	1,050	1,386	2,022	2,535	4,473
Taranaki	Taranaki	Kurahaupō	5,940	5,352	6,087	8,049	10,887
Te Aitanga a Hauiti	Gisborne	Tereanini, Tākitimu, Horouta	n/a	n/a	n/a	2,622	4,866
Te Aitanga-a-Māhaki	Gisborne	Tākitimu	4,365	5,877	6,258	8,121	10,593
Te Ākitai Waiohua	Auckland	Te Wakatūwhenua, Moekākara	n/a	n/a	n/a	135	540
Te Āti Haunui-a-Pāpārangi	Manawatū-Whanganui	Aotea, Tākitimu, others	8,820	10,437	11,691	15,105	16,863
Te Atiawa	Taranaki, Wellington	Tokomaru, Aotea	13,107	17,628	20,850	30,501	34,920
Te Atiawa ki Whakarongotai (part of Te Atiawa)	Wellington	Tokomaru, Aotea	345	615	720	759	1,614
Te Atiawa Taranaki (part of Te Atiawa)	Taranaki	Tokomaru, Aotea	10,152	12,852	15,273	20,937	24,216
Te Ātiawa o Te Waka-a-Māui (part of Te Atiawa)	Tasman, Nelson, Marlborough, West Coast	Tokomaru, Aotea	1,377	2,433	2,301	3,483	5,244
Te Atiawa o Te Whanganui-a-Tara (part of Te Atiawa)	Wellington	Tokomaru, Aotea	1,233	1,728	2,556	3,306	4,749
Te Aupōuri	Northland	Māmari, Ngātokimatawhaorua	7,848	9,333	8,697	11,847	14,028
Te Hika o Papauma (part of Ngāti Kahungunu ki Wairarapa)	Wellington	Tākitimu	n/a	n/a	n/a	246	393
Te Hapū-oneone	Bay of Plenty	Te Rangimātoru	n/a	n/a	n/a	n/a	n/a
Te Kawerau ā Maki	Auckland	Tainui, Aotea, Tokomaru, Kahuitara, Kurahaupō, Moekākara	228	123	150	201	357
Te Korowai o Wainuiārua (grouping)	Manawatū-Whanganui	Aotea, Tākitimu, others	n/a	n/a	n/a	n/a	n/a
Te Paatu (part of Ngāti Kahu)	Northland	Mamaru	n/a	n/a	n/a	390	1,254
Te Patukirikiri	Waikato, Auckland	Ngātokimatawhaorua	60	63	45	60	n/a
Te Rarawa	Northland	Tinana, Māhuhu-ki-te-rangi, Māmari, Ngātokimatawhaorua	11,526	14,892	16,512	23,280	30,213
Te Roroa	Northland	Māhuhu-ki-te-rangi	966	1,170	1,179	1,659	2,619
Te Ūpokorehe (status disputed)	Bay of Plenty	Arautauta, Mātaatua, Nukutere	n/a	n/a	n/a	531	1,383
Te Uri-o-Hau (part of Ngāti Whātua)	Northland, Auckland	Māhuhu-ki-te-rangi	732	1,074	1,260	1,314	2,925
Te Wairoa (part of Ngāti Kahungunu and Ngāti Rongomaiwahine)	Gisborne, Hawke's Bay	Kurahaupo, Tākitimu	n/a	n/a	25,500	n/a	29,187
Te Whānau-ā-Apanui	Bay of Plenty	Tauira-mai-Tawhiti, Mātaatua, Arawa	9,951	11,808	12,951	16,689	21,261
Tūhoe	Bay of Plenty, Hawke's Bay	Mātaatua, Nukutere, Te Rangimātoru	29,259	32,670	34,887	46,479	51,039
Tūhourangi	Bay of Plenty	Arawa	1,617	2,277	2,874	2,976	7,419
Uenuku	Manawatū-Whanganui	Aotea	n/a	n/a	n/a	975	1,980
Uenuku-Kōpako	Bay of Plenty	Arawa	174	429	477	522	2,346
Waikato	Waikato, Auckland	Tainui	35,781	33,429	40,083	51,888	47,664
Waitaha (Bay of Plenty)	Bay of Plenty	Arawa	477	732	975	1,188	2,361
Waitaha (Te Waipounamu/South Island)	Canterbury, Otago, Southland, West Coast, Marlborough, Tasman	Tākitimu	645	972	1,041	1,704	3,792
Whakatōhea	Bay of Plenty	Arautauta, Mātaatua, Nukutere	9,948	12,069	12,177	16,095	19,647

== Map of iwi ==
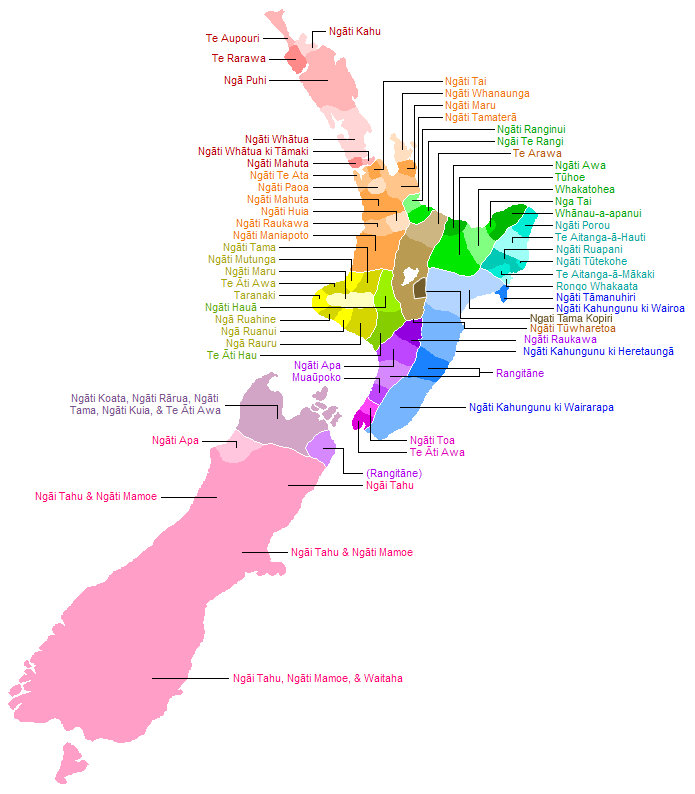

== See also ==
- List of hapū
- List of Māori waka
- Lists of marae in New Zealand
- Ngāti Rānana
