= Tāmaki Māori =

Iwi in New Zealand

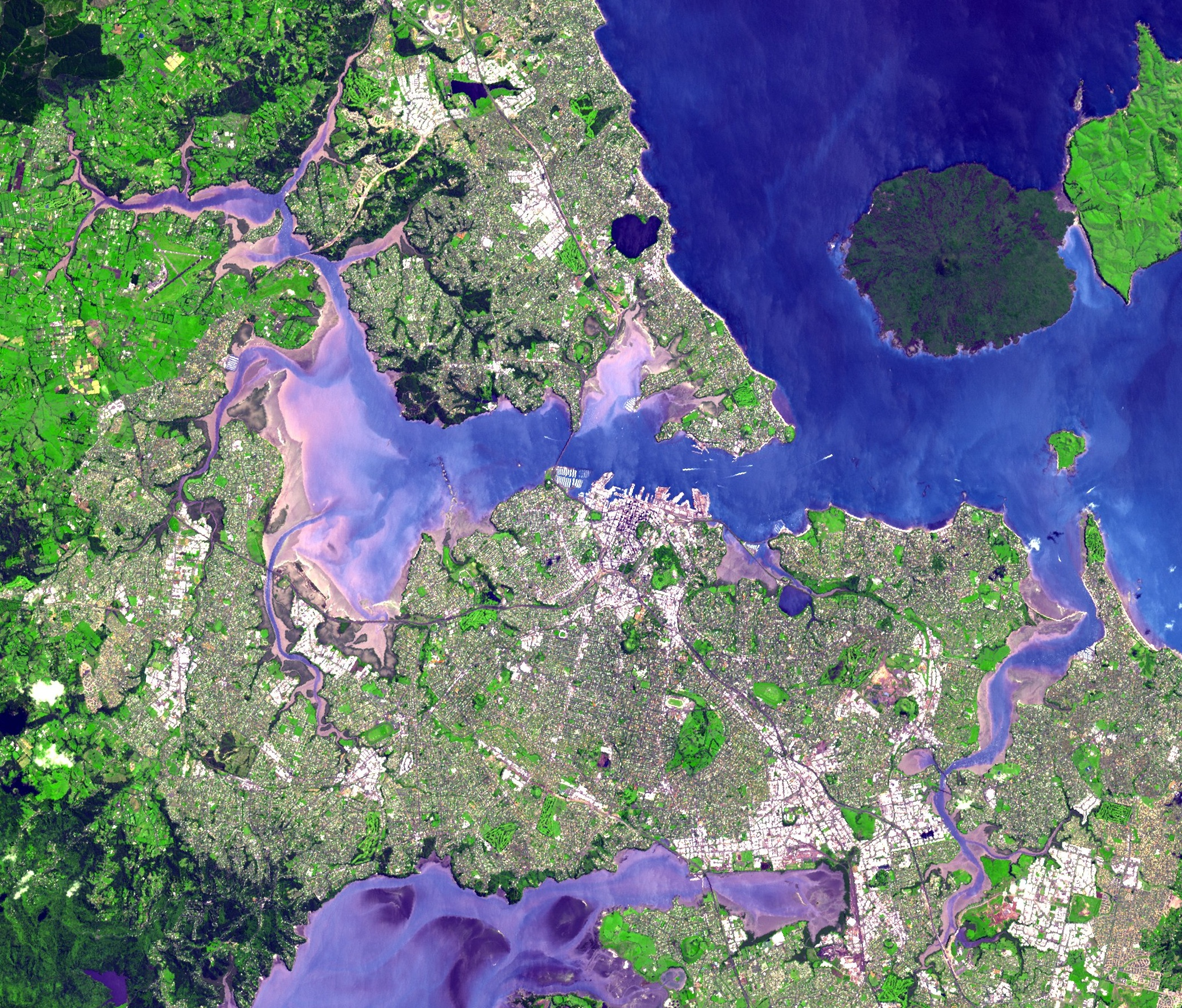
- Tāmaki (Auckland)

Regions with significant populations
- Auckland Region

Languages
- Māori language

Tāmaki Māori are Māori iwi and hapū (tribes and sub-tribes) who have a strong connection to Tāmaki Makaurau (the Auckland region), and whose rohe was traditionally within the region. Among Ngā Mana Whenua o Tāmaki Makaurau (the Māori tribes of Auckland), also known as the Tāmaki collective, there are thirteen iwi and hapū, organised into three rōpū (collectives), however the term "Tāmaki Māori" can also refer to subtribes and historical iwi that are not included in this list.

== Ngāti Whātua rōpū ==
Ngāti Whātua descend from the Māhuhu-ki-te-rangi waka, which landed north of the Kaipara Harbour. The rōpū includes Ngāti Whātua o Kaipara, Ngāti Whātua Ōrākei and Te Rūnanga o Ngāti Whātua.

Te Rūnanga o Ngāti Whātua is a Māori Trust Board formed in the mid 2000s to represent the interests of Ngāti Whātua iwi and hapū collectively, including those outside of Ngāti Whātua o Kaipara and Ngāti Whātua Ōrākei. The rūnanga represents Ngā Oho, Ngāi Tāhuhu, Ngāti Hinga, Ngāti Mauku, Ngāti Rango, Ngāti Rongo, Ngāti Ruinga, Ngāti Torehina, Ngāti Weka, Ngāti Whiti, Patuharakeke, Te Parawhau, Te Popoto, Te Roroa, Te Urioroi, Te Taoū, Te Uri Ngutu, Te Kuihi and Te Uri-o-Hau.

== Waiohua Tāmaki rōpū ==
Te Waiohua tribes descend from the Te Wakatūwhenua and Moekākara waka. The name refers to the ancestor Huakaiwaka, who in the 1600s joined Ngā Oho, Ngā Riki and Ngā Iwi to form a confederation that spanned the region for three generations, until the mid-1700s. Members of this rōpū include Te Ākitai Waiohua, Ngāi Tai ki Tāmaki, Te Kawerau ā Maki, Ngāti Tamaoho and Ngāti Te Ata.

== Marutūāhu rōpū ==
The Marutūāhu collective descends from the Tainui waka, and are based around the Hauraki Gulf. The five iwi descend from the five sons of the ancestor Marutūahu. Members of this rōpū are Ngāti Maru, Ngāti Pāoa, Ngāti Tamaterā, Ngāti Whanaunga and Te Patukirikiri.

== Other iwi ==
In addition to the members of the Tāmaki collective, a number of iwi have a presence within Tāmaki Makaurau:

- Ngāti Awa ki Tāmaki Makaurau, based at Mātaatua Marae and Awanuiarangi Wharenui, at Māngere.
- Ngāti Manuhiri in Rodney, the Hibiscus Coast and the northern Hauraki Gulf.
- Ngātiwai on Aotea / Great Barrier Island.
- Waikato Tainui in South Auckland. Tainui have early historical links to Tāmaki Makaurau, such as the Tainui waka being transported across Te Tō Waka (the Ōtāhuhu portage) between the Tāmaki River and the Manukau Harbour, and crew members of the waka settling in the area. Members of the Ngāti Mahuta hapū settled at the base of Māngere Mountain / Te Pane-o-Mataaho / Te Ara Pueru after a peace accord with Ngāpuhi during the Musket Wars in the 1820s, and when Governor George Grey asked Pōtatau Te Wherowhero and his people to settle at Māngere to protect colonial Auckland in the 1840s. Te Puea Memorial Marae in Māngere Bridge, built in 1965, is known as te kei o te waka o Tainui (the sternpost of Tainui) as it is the northernmost point of the Tainui rohe.
- Urban Māori, who live outside of their traditional rohe. In the 2013 New Zealand census, over 50,000 people living in Tāmaki Makaurau identified as Ngāpuhi, a greater number than those who identify as mana whenua. Large numbers of people who identify as Ngāti Porou, Te Arawa, Ngāti Maniapoto and other iwi affiliations also live in Tāmaki Makaurau, and a significant number of Urban Māori in Auckland do not know their ancestry.

== See also ==
- List of marae in the Auckland Region
