= List of marae in the Auckland Region =

This is a list of marae (Māori meeting grounds) in the Auckland region of New Zealand.

== Great Barrier Island ==
Marae name	Wharenui name	Iwi and Hapū	Location
Kawa Marae	Rehua	Ngāti Rehua, Ngātiwai (Ngāti Rēhua)	Great Barrier Island
Motairehe	Whakaruruhau	Ngātiwai ki Aotea, Ngātiwai	Great Barrier Island

== Rodney ==
Marae name	Wharenui name	Iwi and Hapū	Location
Araparera / Te Aroha Pā	Kia Mahara	Ngāti Whātua o Kaipara (Ngāti Rāngo / Rongo), Ngāti Whātua	Araparera
Haranui / Otakanini	Ngā Tai i Turia ki te Maro	Ngāti Whātua o Kaipara (Ngāti Whātua Tūturu, Te Taoū), Ngāti Whātua	South Kaipara Head
Kakanui Marae	Te Kia Ora	Ngāti Whātua o Kaipara (Ngāti Rāngo / Rongo), Ngāti Whātua	Kakanui
Ōmaha	Te Kiri	Ngāti Manuhiri, Ngātiwai (Ngāti Manuhiri)	Leigh
Puatahi	Te Manawanui	Ngāti Whātua o Kaipara (Ngāti Hine, Ngāti Rāngo / Rongo), Ngāti Whātua	
Reweti	Whiti te Rā	Ngāti Whātua o Kaipara (Te Taoū), Ngāti Whātua	Reweti

== West Auckland ==
Marae name	Wharenui name	Iwi and Hapū	Location
Hoani Waititi Marae	Ngā Tūmanako	Urban Māori	Oratia

== Central Auckland ==
Marae name	Wharenui name	Iwi and Hapū	Location
Ōrākei Marae	Tumutumuwhenua	Ngāti Whātua Ōrākei (Ngā Oho, Te Taoū, Te Uri)	Ōrākei
Piritahi Marae	Piritahi	Ngāti Pāoa	Waiheke Island

== Māngere ==
Marae name	Wharenui name	Iwi and Hapū	Location
Makaurau	Tāmaki Makaurau	Waikato Tainui (Ngāti Paretaua, Te Ākitai, Ngāti Te Ata)	Māngere
Mātaatua Marae	Awanuiarangi	Ngāti Awa (Ngāti Awa ki Tāmaki Makaurau)	Māngere
Te Puea Memorial Marae	Te Puea	Waikato Tainui (Ngāti Kuiaarangi, Ngāti Mahuta, Ngāti Tai, Ngāti Whāwhākia)	Māngere Bridge
Pūkaki	Te Kāhu Pokere o Tāmaki Mākaurau	Te Ākitai Waiohua (Ngāti Pare Waiohua), Waikato Tainui (Te Ākitai, Ngāti Te Ata, Ngāti Paretaua)	Māngere
Nga Whare Waatea Marae	Tangaroa (whare)	Nga Hau e Wha	Māngere

== Franklin ==
Marae name	Wharenui name	Iwi and Hapū	Location
Ngā Hau e Whā	Ngā Hau e Whā	Ngāti Tamaoho, Waikato Tainui (Ngāi Tai, Ngāti Tamaoho)	Pukekohe
Reretēwhioi	Arohanui	Waikato Tainui (Te Ākitai, Ngāti Paretaua, Ngāti Te Ata)	Awhitu Peninsula
Tāhuna	Teuwira	Ngāti Te Ata, Waikato Tainui (Ngāti Paretaua, Ngāti Te Ata, Te Ākitai)	Awhitu Peninsula
Whātāpaka	Tamaoho	Ngāti Tamaoho, Waikato Tainui (Ngāti Koheriki, Ngāi Tai, Ngāti Tamaoho)	Te Hihi
Umupuia	Ngeungeu	Ngāi Tai ki Tāmaki, Waikato Tainui (Ngāti Koheriki, Ngāi Tai)	Duders Beach

== See also ==
- Lists of marae in New Zealand
- Tāmaki Māori
