= Hauraki iwi =

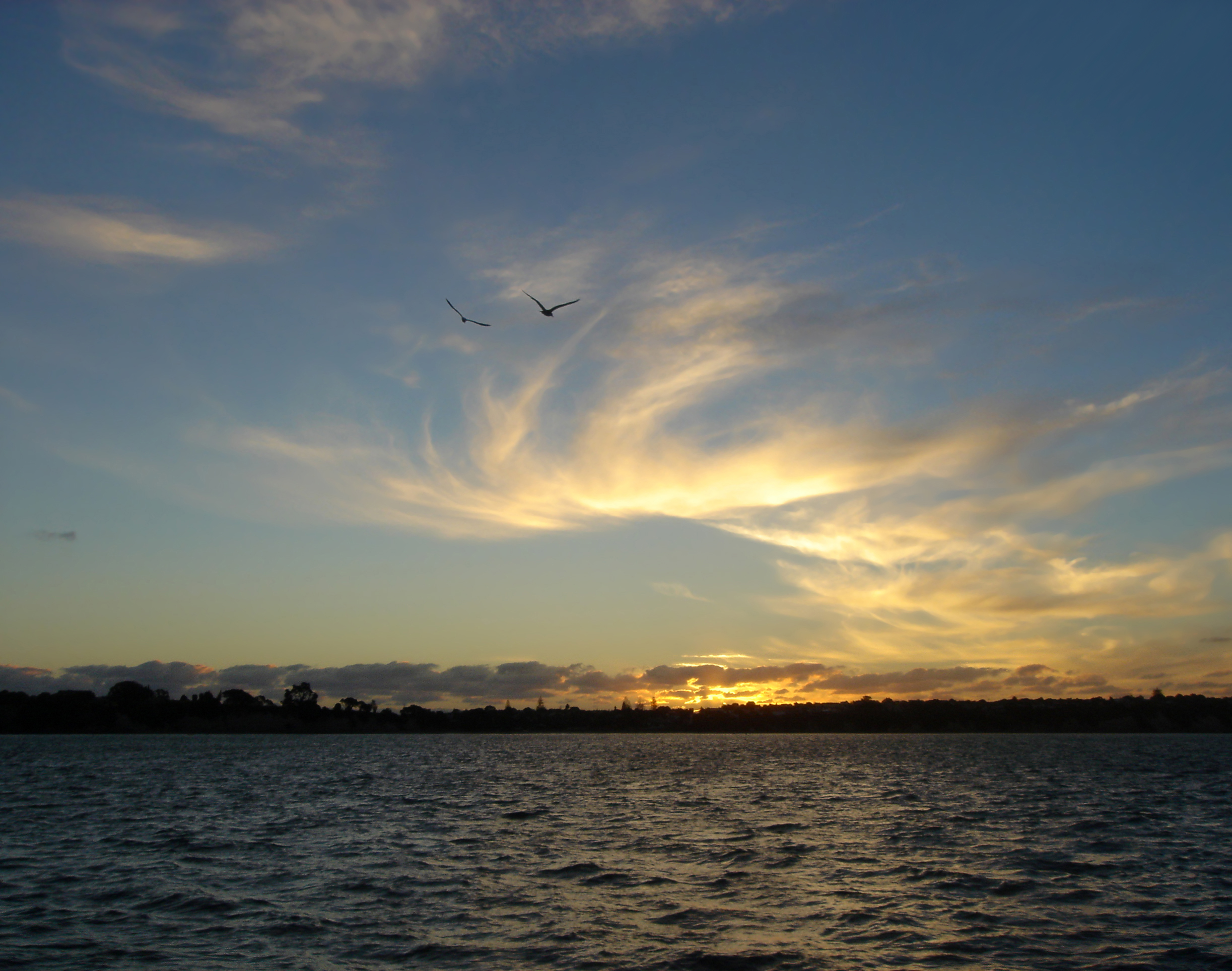
- The Hauraki Gulf, in the rohe (tribal area) of the Hauraki iwi.

Total population
- over 16,000

Regions with significant populations
- Hauraki Gulf, Hauraki Plains, Coromandel Peninsula

Languages
- Māori language

The Hauraki iwi are a group of Māori iwi at or around Hauraki Gulf, New Zealand. They include the Marutūāhu people. Pare Hauraki is the rohe of the Hauraki iwi.

== List of iwi ==
There were 12 iwi who were considered as part of the 2018 treaty settlement:

- Ngāti Hako
- Ngāi Tai ki Tāmaki
- Ngāti Hei
- Ngāti Maru
- Ngāti Pāoa
- Ngāti Porou ki Hauraki
- Ngāti Pūkenga
- Ngāti Rāhiri Tumutumu
- Ngāti Tamaterā
- Ngāti Tara Tokanui
- Ngāti Whanaunga
- Te Patukirikiri

Ngāti Huarere and Ngāti Rongoū are also from the Hauraki region.

== Treaty settlement ==
In July 2018, The Crown signed the "Pare Hauraki Collective Redress Deed" with 5 of the 12 iwi of Hauraki. The deed included the return of 1,000 hectares around the Moehau Range and 1,000 hectares around Mount Te Aroha to the iwi. It functioned as part of a treaty settlement but it did not settle any claims.

Tauranga Moana iwi protested the settlement, saying that it would give Hauraki iwi mana whenua status in Tauranga. They also opposed the Hauraki iwi being represented in local governance. In late 2019, the Waitangi Tribunal found that there were issues with the way that The Crown had reached the settlement. As of 2023, the two iwi groups were still in discussions to resolve the issue.
