= Treaty of Waitangi claims and settlements =

Legal process by which Māori seek redress for breaches of the Treaty of Waitangi

Claims by Māori based on historic grievances against the Crown, and the claims' subsequent settlements, have been a significant feature of New Zealand politics since the Treaty of Waitangi Act 1975 and the Waitangi Tribunal that it established to hear those claims. Successive governments have increasingly provided formal legal and political opportunity for Māori to seek redress for what Māori claim were breaches by the Crown of obligations set out in the Treaty of Waitangi. While it has resulted in putting to rest a number of significant longstanding grievances, the process has been subject to criticisms.

== History of the Treaty ==
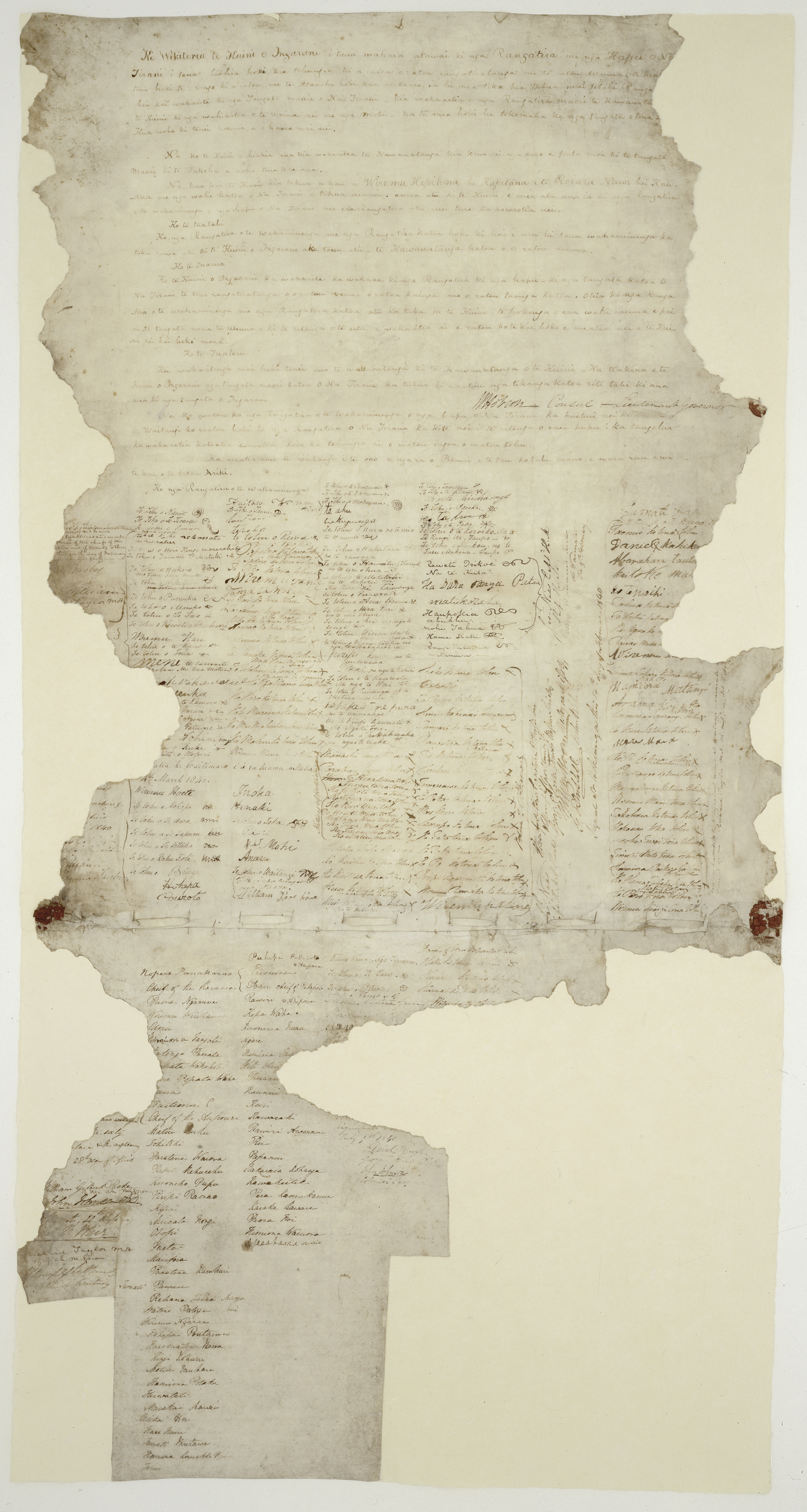
The Waitangi Sheet of the Treaty of Waitangi

The Treaty of Waitangi was first signed on 6 February 1840 by representatives of the British Crown and Māori chiefs (rangatira) from the North Island of New Zealand, with a further 500 signatures added later that year, including some from the South Island. It is one of the founding documents of New Zealand.

The Treaty of Waitangi was written in English and translated into the Māori language (Te Reo). As some words in the English treaty did not translate directly into the written Māori of the time, this text is not an exact translation of the English text, such as in relation to the meaning of having and ceding sovereignty. In the English version, Māori ceded any sovereignty rights in New Zealand they might have had, or might be supposed to have had, to Britain; Māori gave the Crown the exclusive right to purchase lands they wished to sell, and, in return, Māori were guaranteed full ownership of their lands, forests, fisheries and other possessions and were given the rights of British subjects. However, in the Māori language version of the Treaty, the word "sovereignty" was instead translated as kawanatanga (lit. 'governance'). And in contradiction to the English language version, Māori retained authority and sovereignty, and did not give this to the Queen. In addition, the English version guaranteed "undisturbed possession" of all "properties", but the Māori version guaranteed tino rangatiratanga ('full authority, sovereignty') over taonga ('treasures').

Around 530 to 540 Māori, at least 13 of them women, signed the Māori version of the Treaty of Waitangi, known as Te Tiriti o Waitangi. Only 39 signed the English version after the Māori language version was read to them. The different understandings of the content of the treaty led to disagreements between Pākeha and Māori, beginning almost immediately after the signing of the treaty, and contributed to the New Zealand Wars, which culminated in the confiscation of a large part of the Waikato and Taranaki.

== Early settlements and claims ==
Matiaha Tiramōrehu made the first formal statement of Ngāi Tahu grievances in 1849, one year after the Canterbury purchase between Ngāi Tahu and Henry Tacy Kemp, this land transaction was very large, 20 million acres for £2,000. Between the 1870s and the 1990s almost every Ngāi Tahu leader was actively pursuing the Ngāi Tahu claim in Parliament.

In the 1920s, land commissions investigated the grievances of hapū whose land had been confiscated or otherwise fraudulently obtained in the previous century, and many were found to be valid. By the 1940s, settlements in the form of modest annual payments had been arranged with some hapū. However, hapū came to consider the amounts to be inadequate, especially as inflation eroded their value, and the Crown has conceded that it did not sufficiently seek the agreement of hapū to declare their claims settled.

== Waitangi Tribunal ==
During the late 1960s and 1970s the Treaty of Waitangi became the focus of a strong Māori protest movement which rallied around calls for the government to 'honour the treaty' and to 'redress treaty grievances'. Māori expressed their frustration about continuing violations of the treaty and subsequent legislation by government officials, as well as inequitable legislation and unsympathetic decisions by the Māori Land Court alienating Māori land from its Māori owners.

In 1975 the Treaty of Waitangi Act established the Waitangi Tribunal to hear claims about Crown acts that were inconsistent with the principles of the Treaty. It allowed any Māori to lodge a claim against the Crown for breaches of the Treaty of Waitangi and its principles. Originally its mandate was limited to claims about contemporary issues, that is, those that occurred after the establishment of the Tribunal. Early claims included the "Te Reo Māori" claim. As a result of the Tribunal's report into the claim, in 1987 the government made the Māori language an official language of New Zealand, and established the Maori Language Commission to foster it. The pivotal issue considered by the Tribunal was whether a language could be considered a "treasure" or "taonga", and thus protected by the Treaty. Significant research has been undertaken in New Zealand as a result of claims being put to the Waitangi Tribunal. Much of this has been generated by iwi (Māori tribal groups), a lasting example is the Ngāti Awa Research Centre established in 1989.

In 1985 the Fourth Labour Government extended the power of the Tribunal to allow it to consider Crown actions dating back to 1840, including the period covered by the New Zealand Wars. The number of claims quickly rose, and during the early 1990s, the government began to negotiate settlements of historical (pre-1992) claims.

Typically a negotiated Treaty settlement has 'agreed historical account, Crown acknowledgements of Treaty breach, and a Crown apology' and legal extinguishment of all claims. Featured in the Waikato-Tainui Ngāi Tahu settlements in 2009 and all subsequent settlements was redress described in these three areas: a historical account of grievances and an apology, a financial package of cash and transfer of assets (no compulsory acquisition of private land), and cultural redress, where a range of Māori interests are acknowledged which often related to sites of interest and Māori association with the environment.

While early Tribunal recommendations mainly concerned a contemporary issue that could be revised or rectified by the government at the time, historical settlements raised more complex issues. The Office of Treaty Settlements was established in the Ministry of Justice to develop government policy on historical claims. In 1995, the government unilaterally developed the "Crown Proposals for the Settlement of Treaty of Waitangi Claims" to attempt to address the issues and extinguish all Māori treaty claims.

A key element of the proposals was the creation of a "fiscal envelope" of $1 billion for the settlement of all historical claims, an effective limit on what the Crown would pay out in settlements. The Crown held a series of consultation hui around the country, at which Māori vehemently rejected the proposals including such a limitation in advance of the extent of claims being fully known. The concept of the fiscal envelope was subsequently dropped after the 1996 general election although it remained de facto. Despite the protest, three major settlements during were reached during the 1990s. The Minister of Justice and Treaty Negotiations at the time, Sir Douglas Graham, is credited with leading a largely conservative National government to make these breakthroughs.

In 2013 the Ministry of Justice set up a Post Settlement Commitment Unit to create a central register of Treaty commitments that were created through the settlement process when it became clear that settlements were not being actioned. Government Minister Chris Finlayson was part of this and states the purpose was to create an 'institutional safeguard' to protect settlements and support them being durable and final. Finlayson's intention was that the Post Settlement Commitment Unit on completion of settlements would replace the Office of Treaty Settlements. The register was created and Finlayson states of the register, "By the time I left office, over 7000 commitments had been entered into various deeds of settlement." In 2018 the Post Settlement Commitment Unit was incorporated into a new Crown agency Te Arawhiti (Office for Māori Crown Relations). The web-portal Te Haeata was created in 2019 as a searchable record by arms of the Crown to find Treaty settlement commitments as recorded in deeds of settlement and government legislation.

== Settlements of the 1990s ==
=== Sealord ===
The Treaty guaranteed to Māori their lands, forests and fisheries. Over time, however, New Zealand law began to regulate commercial fisheries, so that Māori control was substantially eroded. To resolve this grievance, in 1989 an interim agreement was reached. The Crown transferred 10 percent of New Zealand's fishing quota (some 60,000 tonnes), together with shareholdings in fishing companies and $50 million in cash, to the Waitangi Fisheries Commission. This commission was responsible for holding the fisheries assets on behalf of Māori until an agreement was reached as to how the assets were to be shared among tribes. In 1992, a second part of the deal, referred to as the Sealord deal, marked full and final settlement of Māori commercial fishing claims under the Treaty of Waitangi. This included 50% of Sealord Fisheries and 20% of all new species brought under the quota system, more shares in fishing companies, and $18 million in cash. In total it was worth around $170 million. This settlement was undertaken under the leadership of the Hon. Matiu Rata and Dr. George Habib.

=== Waikato Tainui Raupatu ===
The first major settlement of historical confiscation, or raupatu, claims was agreed in 1995. Waikato-Tainui's confiscation claims were settled for a package worth $170 million, in a mixture of cash and Crown-owned land. The settlement was accompanied by a formal apology as part of the claims legislation, granted Royal assent by Queen Elizabeth II in person during her 1995 Royal tour of New Zealand. The Crown apologised for the Invasion of the Waikato and the subsequent indiscriminate confiscation of land.

=== Ngāi Tahu ===
Ngāi Tahu's claims covered a large proportion of the South Island of New Zealand, and related to the Crown's failure to meet its end of the bargain in land sales that took place from the 1840s. Chris Finlayson was one of the lawyers working for Ngāi Tahu during the mid 1990s as the negotiations were taking place, he states a litigious approach was used and was needed to keep things moving. The settlement deed was signed in 1997 in Kaikōura. Ngāi Tahu sought recognition of their relationship with the land, as well as cash and property, and a number of novel arrangements were developed to address this. Among other things, Ngāi Tahu and the Crown agreed that Mt Cook would be formally renamed Aoraki / Mount Cook, and returned to Ngāi Tahu to be gifted back to the people of New Zealand.

== Settlements of the 2000s ==
The process of negotiating historical claims continued after the 1999 election and the subsequent change in government without radical change to government policy. The models developed for the early settlements remain a strong influence. The first Labour Minister of Treaty Negotiations was Margaret Wilson. On her appointment as Speaker of the House in early 2005, she was followed in the role by Mark Burton. He was replaced by Deputy Prime Minister Michael Cullen in November 2007.

In June 2008, the Crown and representatives from seven Māori tribes signed an agreement relating to Crown forest land that was dubbed "Treelords" by the media, because of perceived similarities to the Sealord deal of the 1990s. Like Sealord, it relates to a single issue, but covers multiple tribes. The agreement contains only financial redress, on account against comprehensive settlements to be negotiated with each tribe within the Collective. The agreement is the largest to date, by financial value, at NZ$196 million worth of forest land in total (including the value of the Affiliate Te Arawa Iwi and hapū share). In addition, but not counted by the government as part of the redress package, the tribes will receive rentals that have accumulated on the land since 1989, valued at NZ$223 million.

By July 2008, there were 23 settlements of various sizes. In November 2008, Chris Finlayson, a Wellington-based lawyer with experience in Treaty claims with Ngāi Tahu, was appointed Minister for Treaty Negotiations following the National Party victory in the 2008 election. Between 2008 and 2017, Finlayson was credited with helping to resolve 60 Treaty settlements.

As well as the much publicised land and financial compensation, many of these later settlements included changing the official place names. This introduced significant numbers of macrons into official New Zealand place names for the first time.

== List of settlements ==
Claimant group	Year lodged	Deed signed	Act / enactment date	Some details on settlements	Ref.
Commercial Fisheries		1992	Treaty of Waitangi (Fisheries Claims) Settlement Act 1992	NZ$170 million	
Ngāti Rangiteaorere		1993	Reserves and Other Lands Disposal Act 1993	Te Ngae Mission Farm, Tikitere	
Hauai		1993	Reserves and Other Lands Disposal Act 1995		
Ngāti Whakaue		1994			
Waikato – Tainui Raupatu		1995	Waikato Raupatu Claims Settlement Act 1995	NZ$170 million	
Waimakuku		1995			
Rotoma		1996			
Te Maunga		1996			
Ngāi Tahu		1997	Ngāi Tahu Claims Settlement Act 1998	NZ$170 million Second major settlement	
Ngāti Tūrangitukua		1998	Ngāti Tūrangitukua Claims Settlement Act 1999		
Pouakani		1999	Pouakani Claims Settlement Act 2000	NZ$2 million	
Te Uri o Hau		2000	Te Uri o Hau Claims Settlement Act 2002		
Ngāti Ruanui		2001	Ngati Ruanui Claims Settlement Act 2003		
Ngāti Tama		2001	Ngati Tama Claims Settlement Act 2003		
Ngāti Awa (including ancillary claims)	1988	2003	Ngāti Awa Claims Settlement Act 2005	NZ$42.3 million Through Ngāti Manawa and Ngāti Whare settlements membership of Rangitāiki River Forum	
Ngāti Tūwharetoa (Bay of Plenty)		2003	Ngāti Tuwharetoa (Bay of Plenty) Claims Settlement Act 2005		
Ngā Rauru Kītahi		2003			
Te Arawa (Lakes)		2004	Te Arawa Lakes Settlement Act 2006	Transferred ownership of 13 lakebeds and established a joint organisation to improve the lakes, Rotorua Lakes Strategy Group (a joint committee between Te Arawa, Bay of Blenty Regional Council and Rotorua District Council)	
Ngāti Mutunga		2005	Ngāti Mutunga Claims Settlement Act 2006		
Te Roroa		2005	Te Roroa Claims Settlement Act 2008		
Te Arawa Affiliate Iwi and hapū		2008	Affiliate Te Arawa Iwi and hapū Claims Settlement Act 2008		
Central North Island Forests Iwi Collective		2008	Central North Island Forests Land Collective Settlement Act 2008	This settlement was with the following iwi: Ngāi Tuhoe, Ngāti Manawa, Ngāti Rangitihi, Ngāti Tūwharetoa, Ngāti Whakaue, Ngāti Whare, Raukawa and the Affiliate Te Arawa Iwi/Hapū	
Taranaki Whānui ki te Upoko o te Ika		2008	Port Nicholson Block (Taranaki Whānui ki Te Upoko o Te Ika) Claims Settlement Act 2009		
Waikato-Tainui		2009	Waikato-Tainui Raupatu Claims (Waikato River) Settlement Act 2010		
Ngāti Apa			Ngāti Apa (North Island) Claims Settlement Act 2010		
			Whanganui Iwi (Whanganui (Kaitoke) Prison and Northern Part of Whanganui Forest) On-account Settlement Act 2011		
Ngāti Manawa	2003	2009	Ngāti Manawa Claims Settlement Act 2012	Four sites vested jointly in Te Rünanga o Ngāti Manawa and Te Rūnanga o Ngāti Whare: Te Tāpiri pā, Okarea pā, Te Rake pā; and Hinamoki pā (battle site)	
Ngāti Whare		2009	Ngāti Whare Claims Settlement Act 2012		
Ngāti Pāhauwera		2010	Ngāti Pāhauwera Treaty Claims Settlement Act 2012		
Ngāti Porou		2010	Ngati Porou Claims Settlement Act 2012	NZ$90 million including Crown forestry rental and cultural redress	
			Maraeroa A and B Blocks Claims Settlement Act 2012		
Ngāti Mākino		2011	Ngāti Mākino Claims Settlement Act 2012		
			Rongowhakaata Claims Settlement Act 2012		
Ngāi Tāmanuhiri		2011	Ngai Tāmanuhiri Claims Settlement Act 2012		
Ngāti Whātua o Kaipara		2011	Ngāti Whātua o Kaipara Claims Settlement Act 2013		
Te Aupōuri	2012	2015		Te Oneroa-a-Tōhē/Ninety Mile Beach Co-Governance	
Raukawa (Waikato)		2012	Raukawa Claims Settlement Act 2014		
Ngāti Ranginui		2012	–		
Tāmaki Makaurau Collective		2012	Ngā Mana Whenua o Tāmaki Makaurau Collective Redress Act 2014		
Ngāti Whare		2012	Ngāti Whare Settlement Claims Act 2012		
Ahuriri Hapū		2016			
Central Whanganui (Te Korowai o Wainuiārua)		2018			
Ngāti Maru (Taranaki)		2020			
Ngāti Maniapoto		2020			
Waikato-Tainui terms of negotiation		2020			
Ngāti Rangitihi		2020			
Ngāti Ruapani		2020			
Te Ākitai Waiohua	2011	2021			
Ngāti Maru (Taranaki)		2021			
Ngāti Pāoa		2021			
Mōkai Pātea		2021			
Ngāti Kahungunu ki Wairarapa Tāmaki nui-a-Rua		2021			
Maniapoto		2021		A Maniapoto Claims Settlement Bill was published in 2021	
Whakatōhea		2021			
Ngāti Mutunga o Wharekauri		2022		Ngāti Mutunga o Wharekauri and the Crown signed an agreement to settle historical Treaty claims relating to the annexation of the Chatham Islands.	
Eight Taranaki tribes		2025	Taranaki Maunga Collective Redress Act 2025	The NZ Parliament passed the Taranaki Maunga Collective Redress Bill, which conferred legal personhood on Mount Taranaki. The New Zealand Crown also apologised to eight Māori iwi for confiscating Mount Taranaki and 1.2 million acres of Māori lands in the Taranaki region. In addition, Mount Egmont would cease to be an official name for Mt Taranaki.	
Ngāti Ranginui		2025	Ngā Hapū o Ngāti Ranginui Claims Settlement Act 2025	The Government apologises to Ngāti Ranginui for land confiscations and a scorched earth campaign during the New Zealand Wars. Parliament also passed legislation compensating the tribe NZ$38 million and designating 15 sites of historical significance to the tribe.	
Ngāti Pāoa		2025	Ngāti Pāoa Claims Settlement Act 2025	The Government apologised to Ngāti Pāoa for historical land alienation. The settlement includes NZ$23.5 million in financial compensation and recognising 12 "culturally significant" sites.	
Ngāti Hāua		2026	Ngāti Hāua Claims Settlement Act 2026	Implements the Crown's Treaty settlement with Ngāti Hāua, which includes NZ$19 million worth of financial redress, the return of 64 culturally-significant sites and posthumous pardons for Mātene Rita Te Whareaitu and Te Rangiātea.	

== Mana motuhake and the Treaty ==
=== Waitangi Tribunal's Te Paparahi o te Raki inquiry ===
The Waitangi Tribunal, in Te Paparahi o te Raki inquiry (Wai 1040) is in the process of considering the Māori and Crown understandings of He Whakaputanga o te Rangatiratanga / the 1835 Declaration of Independence and Te Tiriti o Waitangi / the Treaty of Waitangi 1840. This aspect of the inquiry raises issues as to the nature of sovereignty and whether the Māori signatories to the Treaty of Waitangi intended to transfer sovereignty.

The first stage of the report was released in November 2014, and found that Māori chiefs in Northland never agreed to give up their sovereignty when they signed the Treaty of Waitangi in 1840. Although the Crown intended to negotiate the transfer of sovereignty through the Treaty, the chiefs' understanding of the agreement was they were only ceding the power for the Crown to control Pākeha and protect Māori. A month before the report's official release a letter was sent to Te Ururoa Flavell, Minister for Māori Development, to notify him of the Tribunal's conclusion. It was signed by Māori Land Court judge Craig Coxtead. Below is a brief excerpt:

We have concluded that in February 1840 the rangatira who signed te Tiriti did not cede their sovereignty . That is, they did not cede their authority to make and enforce law over their people or their territories . rather, they agreed to share power and authority with the Governor . They agreed to a relationship: one in which they and Hobson were to be equal – equal while having different roles and different spheres of influence . in essence, rangatira retained their authority over their hapū and territories, while Hobson was given authority to control Pākehā .

— Report on Stage 1 of the Te Paparahi o Te Raki inquiry, Waitangi Tribunal (November 2014), page 23

Tribunal manager Julie Tangaere said at the report's release to the Ngapuhi claimants:

Your tupuna [ancestors] did not give away their mana at Waitangi, at Waimate, at Mangungu. They did not cede their sovereignty. This is the truth you have been waiting a long time to hear.

In terms of mana motuhake He Whakaputanga, creating a Māori state and government in 1835 and/or Te Tiriti o Waitangi, and those who did not sign anything, thus maintaining mana motuhake. In relation to the former, a summary report (entitled "Ngāpuhi Speaks") of evidence presented to the Waitangi Tribunal concluded that:

1. Ngāpuhi did not cede their sovereignty.
2. The Crown had recognised He Whakaputanga as a proclamation by the rangatira of their sovereignty over this country.
3. The treaty entered into by the rangatira and the Crown — Te Tiriti o Waitangi — followed on from He Whakaputanga, establishing the role of the British Crown with respect to Pākeha.
4. The treaty delegated to Queen Victoria’s governor the authority to exercise control over hitherto lawless Pākeha in areas of hapū land allocated to the Queen.
5. The Crown's English language document, referred to as the Treaty of Waitangi, was neither seen nor agreed to by Ngāpuhi and instead reflects the hidden wishes of British imperial power.

==== Non-signatory iwi and hapū ====
Ngāti Tūwharetoa academic Hemopereki Simon outlined a case in 2017, using Ngati Tuwharetoa as a case study, for how hapū and iwi that did not sign the Treaty still maintain mana motuhake and how the sovereignty of the Crown could be considered questionable. This work builds on the Te Paparahi o te Raki inquiry (Wai 1040) decision by the Waitangi Tribunal.

== Criticisms ==
The Treaty settlement process has attracted criticisms since it began.

The “fiscal envelope” decision by the Government in 1994 had a consultation period in which most Māori 'overwhelmingly rejected' the policy and sparked protests throughout New Zealand. The criticism was about the non-negotiable element of a fiscal cap as well as the amount ($1 billion) when Crown valuers assessed that the 1990 dollar loss to just Ngāi Tahu was 'between $12 billion and $15 billion' and the context of Government spending (for example the annual spending in 2018 (excluding capital investment) was about $87 billion).

The Government settlement process has since 1999 focused mostly on negotiating settlements with iwi (or 'large natural groupings') which has been criticised as not seeking the 'most appropriate social structures for resolving historical Treaty breaches'.

Politicians critical include Winston Peters from New Zealand First suggesting in 2002 that too many claims were being allowed. The ACT party criticised the process and the concept that 'no amount of money can undo past wrongs'. Public Access New Zealand and the One New Zealand Foundation were lobby groups formed to oppose the aspects of Treaty settlements.

The Orewa Speech in 2004 saw the National Party for the first time take up the term "Treaty of Waitangi Grievance Industry". National's Māori Affairs spokeswoman Georgina te Heuheu, who was Associate Minister to Sir Douglas Graham, was replaced in the role by Gerry Brownlee. Specific criticism that members of the National Party have made against settlements is that they are not being negotiated quickly enough, that insufficient attention is being given to ensure that claimant negotiators have the support of their people, and that settlement legislation is giving inappropriate weight to the spiritual beliefs of Māori.

In 2005 the Māori Party and Green Party both criticised Treaty settlements on the grounds that the Crown has too much power in negotiations, that settlements negotiated at an iwi level ignore the rights of hapū (clans or subtribes), and that settlement redress is too parsimonious.

While some disagreement remains, parties unanimously supported the legislation to implement the Te Roroa, Affiliate Te Arawa and Central North Island settlements, which were passed in September 2008.

Not addressing overlapping interests in claims early in the process is a criticism made in 2019 over the Pare Hauraki treaty settlement, a criticism made by Ngāti Wai and acknowledged by Treaty Negotiations Minister Andrew Little as a failing in the process.

Academic Linda Te Aho (Associate Professor, Te Piringa Faculty of Law, University of Waikato) summarises criticisms of the Treaty settlement processes as being:

too heavily weighted in the government's favour', not enough compensation for losses and that the process pits 'Māori against Māori.

Academics Professor Margaret Mutu and Tiopira McDowell of the University of Auckland argue that the purpose of the settlements was to extinguish claims so that claimants cannot have State Owned Enterprise and Crown Forest lands returned to them through binding recommendations.

Academic Carwyn Jones in his PhD (published in 2016 by UBC Press, Vancouver) is critical of The Treaty of Waitangi settlement process as 'undermining Māori legal traditions' and sees this as 'impeding the reconciliation of Māori law with the New Zealand legal system'.

== See also ==
- Nelson Tenths, a settlement between the Crown and Te Tau Ihu Māori
