= Ōtene Pāora =

Ōtene Pāora (c.1870 – 29 December 1930) was a New Zealand Māori leader, Anglican lay reader and land negotiator. He was a son of Paora Kawharu and identified with the Ngāti Whātua iwi. He was born in Reweti (south of Helensville), New Zealand.

He unsuccessfully contested the 1919 election in the Western Maori electorate. Of 12 candidates, he came tenth.
