= Ngāti Kahungunu ki Tamatea =

Māori iwi (tribe) in Aotearoa New Zealand

- Iwi (tribe) in Māoridom
- Waka (canoe): Tākitimu
- Population: 1,902 (2018)

Ngāti Kahungunu ki Tamatea is a tribal division within the Māori iwi (tribe) of Ngāti Kahungunu in the south-east of New Zealand's North Island. It consists of a number of hapū (sub-tribes) located within a rohe (tribal area) predominantly within the Central Hawke's Bay District.

Ngāti Kahungunu ki Tamatea is one of six divisions within the tribe. Ngāti Kahungunu ki Te Wairoa, Ngāti Kahungunu ki Te Whanganui-a-Orotu and Ngāti Kahungunu ki Heretaunga are located to the north. Ngāti Kahungunu ki Tamakinui a Rua and Ngāti Kahungunu ki Wairarapa are located to the south. The Wairoa, Heretaunga and Wairarapa divisions are traditionally larger than Tamatea and the other two divisions.

== See also ==
- List of Māori iwi
