= Ngāti Kahu =

Māori iwi (tribe) in New Zealand

- Iwi (tribe) in Māoridom
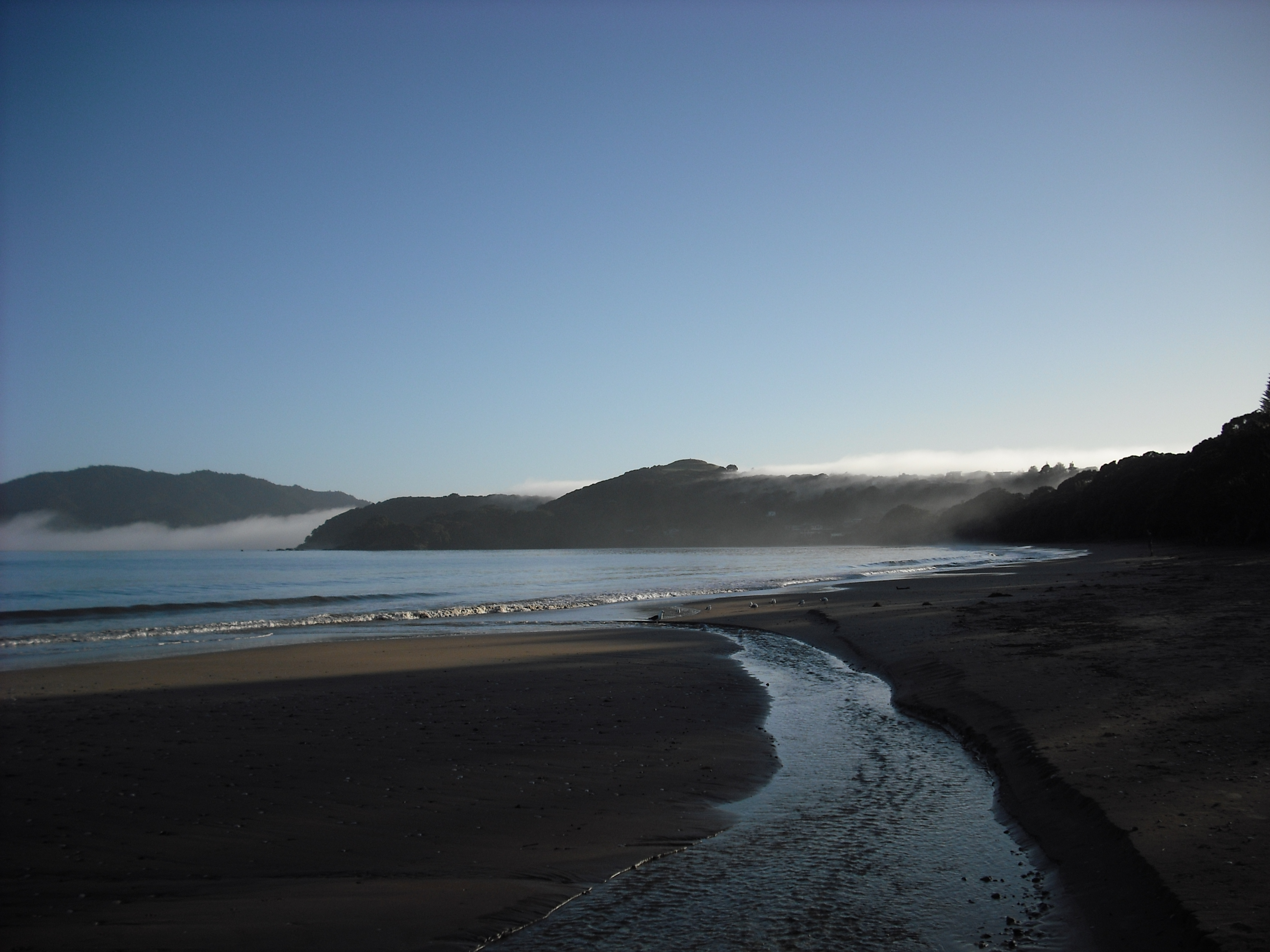
- Coopers Beach

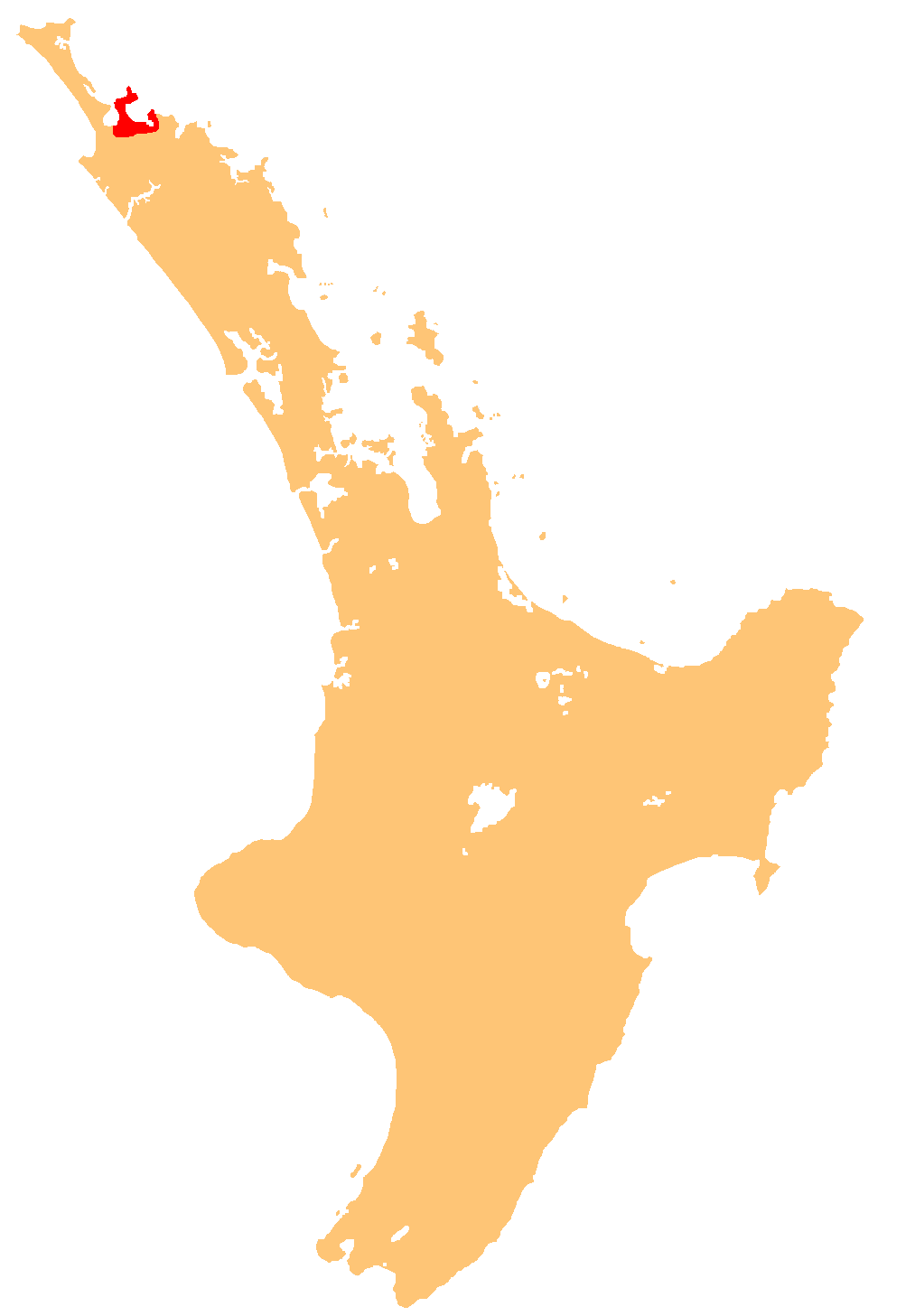
- Rohe (region): Northland Region
- Waka (canoe): Mamaru
- Population: 8,580
- Website: http://www.ngatikahu.iwi.nz

Ngāti Kahu is a Māori iwi of Northland, New Zealand. The iwi is one of the six Muriwhenua iwi of the far north of the North Island. Ngāti Kahu take their name from their founding ancestress, Kahutianui, and link their ancestry back to the waka Māmaru. The captain of Māmaru was Te Parata who married Kahutianui.

Ngāti Kahu identify themselves through the following series of markers captured in their pepeha (tribal aphorism):

- Ko Maungataniwha te maunga (Maungataniwha is the mountain)
- Ko Tokerau te moana (Tokerau is the sea),
- Ko Kahutianui te tupuna (Kahutianui is the ancestress),
- Ko Te Parata te tangata (Te Parata is the man),
- Ko Māmaru te waka (Mamaru is the canoe),
- Ko Ngāti Kahu te iwi (Ngati Kahu is the tribe).

== History ==
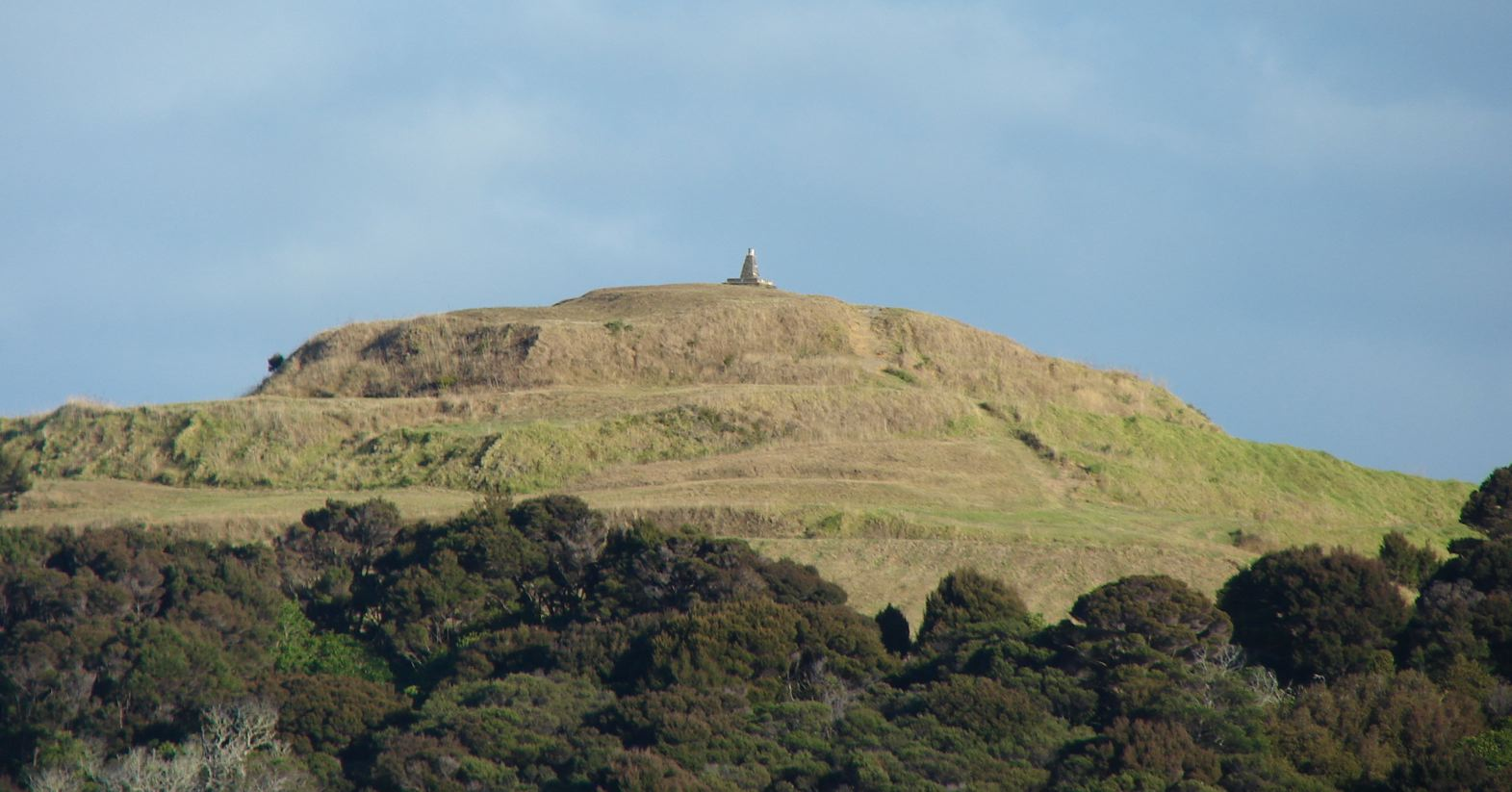
Rangikapiti Pa

McCully Matiu, kaumātua rangatira of Ngāti Kahu until his death in 2001, provided the following genealogical account of his Ngāti Kahu ancestry:

In the accounts of the descent lines of Ngāti Kahu, Kahutianui married Te Parata and Māmangi was born. Māmangi had Tūkanikani, Tūkanikani had Hāpute. Hāpute had Haiti-tai-marangai. Haiti-tai-marangai had Tūpōia, Huungahuunga, Tahuroa, Taramaia, Mokokohi and Aukiwa. Tahuroa had Hautapu. Hautapu had Wai-puiārangi. Wai-puiārangi married Moroki, and Mohotu was born. Mohotu had Te Ao-ka-waiho. Te Ao ka-waiho had Tūrou. Tūrou had Tangi-kāo. Tangi-kāo married Matahina and Te Rātahi was born. Te Rātahi married Te Ao and Hēnihīkahe was born. Hēni married Te Paekoi and Matiu was born. Matiu married Kiritiana and Reihana was born. Reihana married Hoana and the speaker, McCully Matiu, was born. That completes this descent line.

All Ngāti Kahu can trace their genealogy back to their founding ancestors.

== Territory ==
Ngāti Kahu view themselves as holding authority and power derived from their ancestors over several inland territories including the Maungataniwha range and all the lands to the north and east of the range including the settlements with their associated marae of Waiaua, Hīhī, Kēnana, Kohumaru, Aputerewa, Mangōnui, Koekoeā (Coopers beach), Waipapa (Cable Bay), Taipā, Te Āhua, Pēria, Parapara, Aurere, Lake Ōhia, Rangiputa, Whatuwhiwhi, Karikari, Mērita, Kāingaroa, Karepōnia, Oinu, Ōpoka, Ōturu, Kaitāia, Ōkahu, Tangonge, Waipapakauri, Takahue, Pāmapūria, Mangataiore (Victoria Valley) and all areas between. They also have authority over the sea territories of the Mangōnui and Rangaunu harbours.

== Notable people ==
- James Ashcroft (b.1978), film director
- Hector Busby, navigator and waka (canoe or ship) builder (1932–2019)
- Makarena Dudley, psychologist, lecturer at the University of Auckland and dementia researcher
- Ameliaranne Ekenasio, netball player and captain of the Silver Ferns in 2021
- Ricky Houghton, entrepreneur (1960–2022)
- Dame Cindy Kiro, Governor-General since 2021
- Margaret Mutu, academic and professor at the University of Auckland

== See also ==
- Ngāpuhi / Ngāti Kahu ki Whaingaroa
- Ngāti Kahu ki Whangaroa
- List of iwi
