= Te Wakaringaringa =

- Great Māori migration waka

In Māori tradition, Te Wakaringaringa was one of the great ocean-going, voyaging canoes that was used in the migrations that settled New Zealand. Ngāti Ruanui and Ngā Rauru iwi link their ancestry to Māwakeroa, the captain of Te Wakaringaringa.

== See also ==
- List of Māori waka
