= Tracey Panek =

New Zealand Māori historian and archivist

- Born: New Zealand

Academic background
- Education: University of California, Berkeley; California State University, Sacramento

Academic work
- Discipline: Corporate history, fashion history
- Institutions: AAA Northern California, Nevada & Utah; Levi Strauss & Co.

Tracey Panek is a New Zealand Māori historian and archivist who serving as the director of the historical archives at Levi Strauss & Co. since 2014. She manages its collection of vintage garments and artifacts.

== Early life ==
Panek was born in New Zealand and is of Māori descent, affiliated with the Ngāpuhi and Ngāti Rehua iwi. Her maternal family, the Wihongi whānau, are from Awarua, a town near Kaikohe. She has three siblings. During her childhood, Panek lived in Canada with her family due to her father's work and later in Auckland with her grandparents before immigrating to the United States for college. She also lived in the western United States as a child.

Panek completed a bachelor's degree in history at the University of California, Berkeley in 1995. She earned a master's degree in history from California State University, Sacramento. She interned at the California State Archives.

== Career ==
Panek started her career as a business historian in the cell phone industry. She worked for 14 years as a historian and archivist at AAA Northern California, Nevada & Utah. In 2014, started at Levi Strauss & Co., headquartered in San Francisco, becoming the company's historian and director of the Levi's historical archives.

In her role at Levi's, Panek manages an archive of historical garments, documents, and artifacts dating back to the 19th century. She collaborates with designers, using vintage pieces to inspire contemporary designs, such as Levi's Orange Tab and reproduction collections. Her responsibilities include acquiring new items for the archive, such as the "Leadville Levi's," a pair of jeans from the 1890s found in Colorado, and Albert Einstein's 1930s leather jacket.

Panek contributed to the 2016 Victoria and Albert Museum exhibition "You Say You Want a Revolution? Records & Rebels 1966–1970," where Levi's garments were featured. She engages with the public, sharing the stories behind Levi's archival items, such as denim worn by historical figures like Steve Jobs and Albert Einstein.
