= Ngāti Kahungunu ki Te Wairoa =

Māori iwi (tribe) in Aotearoa New Zealand

- Iwi (tribe) in Māoridom
- Waka (canoe): Tākitimu
- Population: 25,026 (2018)

Ngāti Kahungunu ki Te Wairoa is a tribal division within the Māori iwi (tribe) of Ngāti Kahungunu in New Zealand's Hawke's Bay Region. It consists of a number of hapū (sub-tribes) located within a rohe (tribal area) south of the Wharerata Ranges at Poverty Bay, including the modern day Wairoa District.

Ngāti Kahungunu ki Te Wairoa is the most northern of the six divisions within the tribe, and one of three main tribal divisions. The others, from north to south, are Ngāti Kahungunu ki Te Whanganui-a-Orotu, Ngāti Kahungunu ki Heretaunga, Ngāti Kahungunu ki Tamatea, Ngāti Kahungunu ki Tamakinui a Rua and Ngāti Kahungunu ki Wairarapa.

== See also ==
- List of Māori iwi
