= List of hapū =

Hapū of New Zealand

This is a list of hapū (New Zealand Māori sub-tribes).

== K ==
- Kōhatutaka

== N ==
- Ngā Uri o Puhatahi
- Ngāi Tāwake ki te Moana
- Ngāi Tāwake ki te Tuawhenua
- Ngāi Tāwake ki te Waoku
- Ngāi Tāwake
- Ngāi Tū Te Auru
- Ngāti Hao
- Ngāti Hau
- Ngāti Hine
- Ngāti Hineira
- Ngāti Hinemutu
- Ngāti Horahia
- Ngāti Kahu o Torongare
- Ngāti Kairewa
- Ngāti Kawa
- Ngāti Kerewheti
- Ngāti Kiriahi
- Ngāti Kōpaki
- Ngāti Korohue
- Ngāti Korokoro
- Ngāti Kura
- Ngāti Kuta
- Ngāti Māhia
- Ngāti Manu
- Ngāti Mau
- Ngāti Miru
- Ngāti Moe
- Ngāti Moerewa
- Ngati Moko
- Ngāti Ngāherehere
- Ngāti Pākau
- Ngāti Pare
- Ngāti Rāhiri
- Ngāti Rangi
- Ngāti Rangi
- Ngāti Rauwawe
- Ngāti Rēhia
- Ngāti Ruamahue
- Ngāti Tautahi
- Ngāti Tautahi
- Ngāti Tawake ki te Tuawhenua
- Ngāti Te Ara
- Ngāti Te Pou
- Ngāti Te Rēinga
- Ngāti Te Rino
- Ngāti Te Tāwera
- Ngāti Toki
- Ngāti Torehina
- Ngāti Toro
- Ngāti Tuapango
- Ngāti Tūpango
- Ngāti Ueoneone
- Ngāti Wai
- Ngāti Whakaeke
- Ngāti Whakahotu
- Ngāti Whakaminenga
- Ngāti Whārara

== P ==
- Patukeha

== T ==
- Takoto Kē
- Te Hikutu
- Te Honihoni
- Te Kapotai
- Te Kau i Mua
- Te Kumutu
- Te Māhurehure
- Te Ngahengahe
- Te Orewai
- Te Parawhau
- Te Patuharakeke
- Te Popoto
- Te Poukā
- Te Rauwera
- Te Uri Karaka
- Te Uri Māhoe
- Te Uri o Hua
- Te Uri Ongaonga
- Te Uri Taniwha
- Te Uriroroi
- Te Whānau Whero
- Te Whanauwhero

== U ==
- Uri o Te Tangata

== W ==
- Whānautara
