= Ngāti Kahungunu ki Te Whanganui-a-Orotu =

Māori iwi (tribe) in Aotearoa New Zealand

- Iwi (tribe) in Māoridom
- Waka (canoe): Tākitimu
- Population: 2,130 (2018)

Ngāti Kahungunu ki Te Whanganui-a-Orotu is a tribal division within the Māori iwi (tribe) of Ngāti Kahungunu in New Zealand's Hawke's Bay Region. It consists of a number of hapū (sub-tribes) located within a rohe (tribal area) east of Hawke Bay that includes the city of Napier and parts of the surrounding Hastings District.

Ngāti Kahungunu ki Te Whanganui-a-Orotu. Ngāti Kahungunu ki Te Wairoa is located to the north. Ngāti Kahungunu ki Heretaunga, Ngāti Kahungunu ki Tamatea, Ngāti Kahungunu ki Tamakinui a Rua and Ngāti Kahungunu ki Wairarapa are located to the south. The Wairoa, Heretaunga and Wairarapa divisions are traditionally larger than Te Whanganui-a-Orotu and the other two divisions.

== See also ==
- List of Māori iwi
