= Te Kōhatuwhenua =

- Great Māori migration waka

In Māori tradition, Te Kōhatuwhenua was one of the great ocean-going, voyaging canoes that was used in the migrations that settled New Zealand. Taranaki iwi Ngāti Ruanui and Ngā Rauru trace their ancestry back to Taikehu, the captain of Te Kōhatuwhenua.

== See also ==
- List of Māori waka
