= Te Patukirikiri =

Māori iwi (tribe) in Aotearoa New Zealand

- Iwi (tribe) in Māoridom
- Rohe (region): Tāmaki and Hauraki
- Waka (canoe): Tainui
- Population: 45 (2013)

Te Patukirikiri is a Māori iwi of the Tāmaki and Hauraki areas of New Zealand. It has its origins in the Waiohua Confederation, a group of tribes that are located in the Tāmaki isthmus and trace back to the Tainui Waka. Te Patukiriri is a small iwi with only 45 people identifying as being a descendant in the 2013 New Zealand census.

Despite not having a direct line with the Marutūahu Confederation, Te Patukirikiri is currently a member of the Marutūahu Collective which seeks redress from the Crown. Their area of interest is split into two, with one area in east Tāmaki and a second disconnected area of interest in the Hauraki gulf. As such, they are also a member of The Tamaki Collective and the Pare Hauraki Collective.

Radio station Nga Iwi FM broadcasts for Te Patukirikiri, Marutūahu from the iwi of Ngāti Tamaterā, Ngāti Rongoū, Ngāti Whanaunga, Ngāti Maru and Ngāti Pāoa, and other Hauraki residents from Ngāti Hako, Ngāti Huarere, Ngāti Hei, Ngāi Tai, Ngāti Pūkenga and Ngāti Rāhiri. It was set up Paeroa on 9 March 1990 to cover local events and promote Māori language. It expanded its reach to the Coromandel Peninsula, Hauraki Gulf and Huntly in mid-1991. The station is available on 92.2 FM on Coromandel Peninsula, 99.5 FM in Paeroa, and 92.4 FM across the Hauraki Plains to Miranda and Huntly.

== See also ==
- Hauraki Māori
- List of Māori iwi
