= Ngāti Kahungunu ki Heretaunga =

Māori iwi (tribe) in Aotearoa New Zealand

- Iwi (tribe) in Māoridom
- Rohe (region): Wairoa District
- Waka (canoe): Tākitimu
- Population: 21,318 (2018)

Ngāti Kahungunu ki Heretaunga is a tribal division within the Māori iwi (tribe) of Ngāti Kahungunu in New Zealand's Hawke's Bay Region. It consists of a number of hapū (sub-tribes) located within the rohe (tribal area) east of Hawke Bay, mostly within the modern day Hastings District.

Ngāti Kahungunu ki Heretaunga is one of six divisions within the tribe. Ngāti Kahungunu ki Te Wairoa, Ngāti Kahungunu ki Te Whanganui-a-Orotu are located to the north. Ngāti Kahungunu ki Tamatea, Ngāti Kahungunu ki Tamakinui a Rua and Ngāti Kahungunu ki Wairarapa are located to the south. The Wairoa, Heretaunga and Wairarapa divisions are traditionally larger than the other three divisions.

== See also ==
- List of Māori iwi
