= Ngāti Kahungunu ki Tamakinui a Rua =

Māori iwi (tribe) in Aotearoa New Zealand

- Iwi (tribe) in Māoridom
- Waka (canoe): Tākitimu
- Population: 1,077 (2018)

Ngāti Kahungunu ki Tamakinui a Rua is a tribal division within the Māori iwi (tribe) of Ngāti Kahungunu in the south-east of New Zealand's North Island. It consists of a number of hapū (sub-tribes) located within a rohe (tribal area) similar to the current Tararua District.

Ngāti Kahungunu ki Tamakinui a Rua is one of six divisions within the tribe. Ngāti Kahungunu ki Te Wairoa, Ngāti Kahungunu ki Te Whanganui-a-Orotu, Ngāti Kahungunu ki Heretaunga and Ngāti Kahungunu ki Tamatea are located to the north. Ngāti Kahungunu ki Wairarapa is located to the south. The Wairoa, Heretaunga and Wairarapa divisions are traditionally larger than Tamakinui a Rua and the other two divisions.

== See also ==
- List of Māori iwi
