= Ngāti Pūkenga ki Waiau =

Māori iwi (tribe) in New Zealand

- Iwi (tribe) in Māoridom
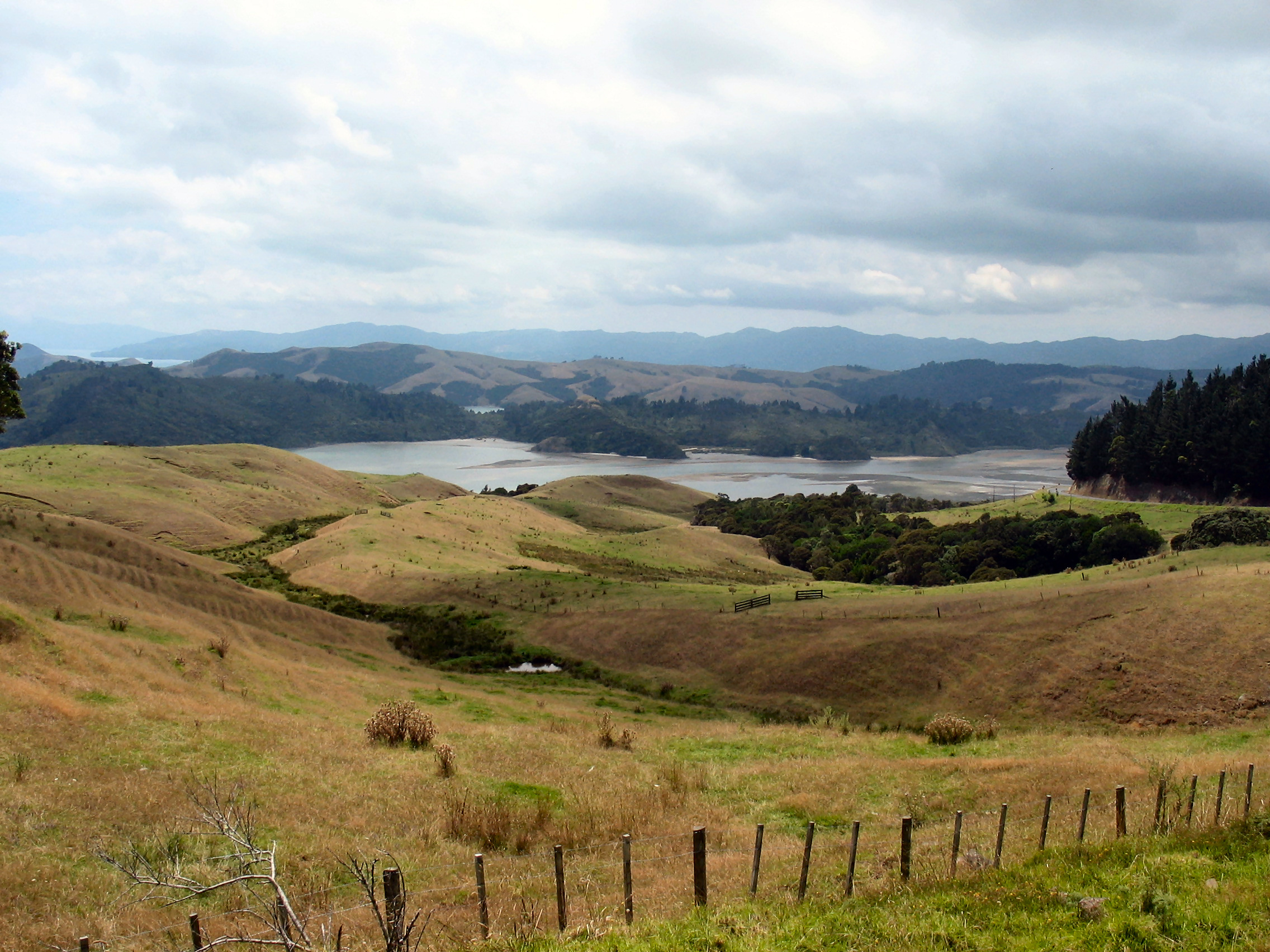
- Manaia Harbour
- Rohe (region): Manaia, New Zealand
- Waka (canoe): Mātaatua
- Website: www.ngatipukenga.co.nz

Ngāti Pūkenga ki Waiau is a Māori iwi of New Zealand.

== Hapū and marae ==
Ngāti Pūkenga ki Waiau has three hapū (sub-tribes): Ngāti Kiorekino, Ngāti Te Rākau and Te Tāwera.

The tribe's marae (traditional meeting ground) is Manaia Marae on Marae Road.

It marae includes Te Kou o Rehua, a wharenui (traditional meeting house) where official events are held.

== See also ==
- List of Māori iwi
