= Pangatoru =

- Great Māori migration waka
- Commander: Rakewanangaora
- Landed at: Whanganui

In Māori tradition, Pangatoru was one of the great ocean-going, voyaging canoes that were used in the migrations that settled New Zealand.

== See also ==
- List of Māori waka
