= Ngāti Tamaoho =

Māori iwi (tribe) in Aotearoa (New Zealand

- Iwi (tribe) in Māoridom

Ngāti Tamaoho is a Māori iwi (tribe) of Auckland and the Waikato District of New Zealand. It is part of the Waiohua confederation of tribes. They have three marae, which are at Karaka, Mangatangi and Pukekohe. The tribe is a strong supporter of the Māori King Movement.

In December 2012, the iwi signed an agreement in principle to settle historic claims with the government of New Zealand under the Treaty of Waitangi settlement process. A settlement was signed on 30 April 2017.

== See also ==
- List of Māori iwi
