= Te Aupōuri =

Māori iwi (tribe) in Aotearoa New Zealand

- Iwi (tribe) in Māoridom
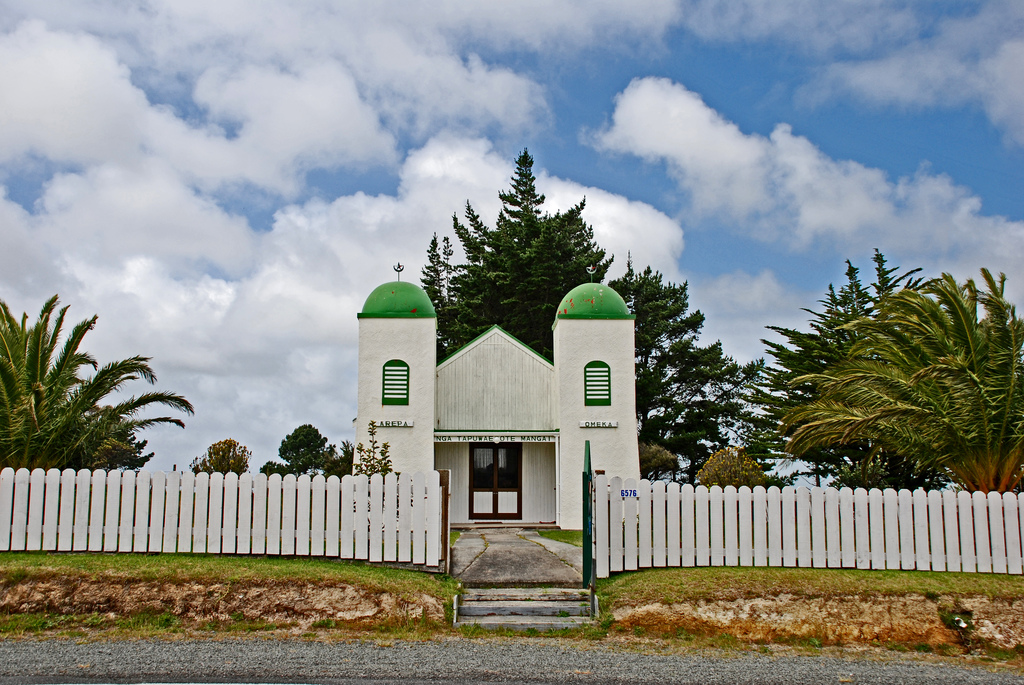
- Rātana Church at Te Kao

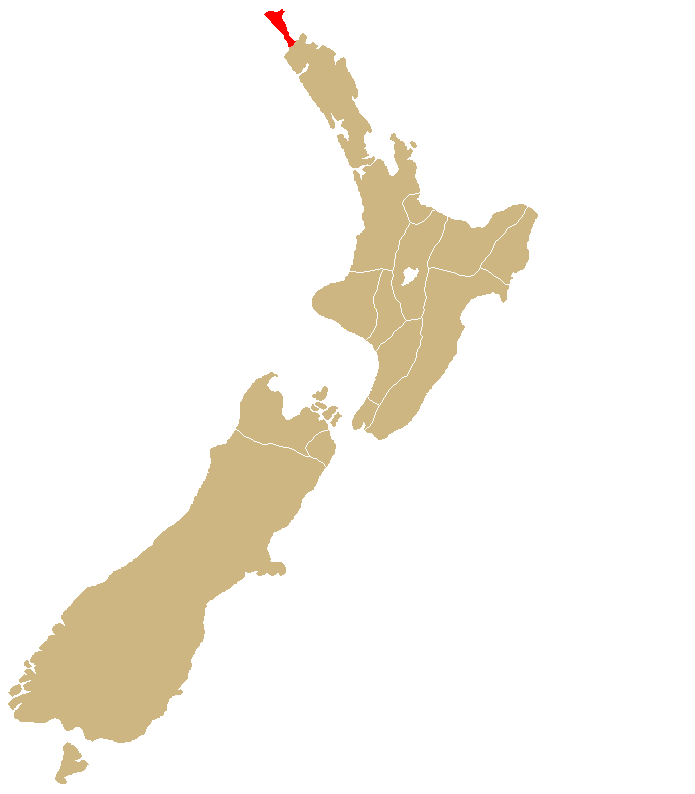
- Rohe (region): Northland
- Waka (canoe): Māmari
- Population: 8,697
- Website: www.teaupouri.iwi.nz

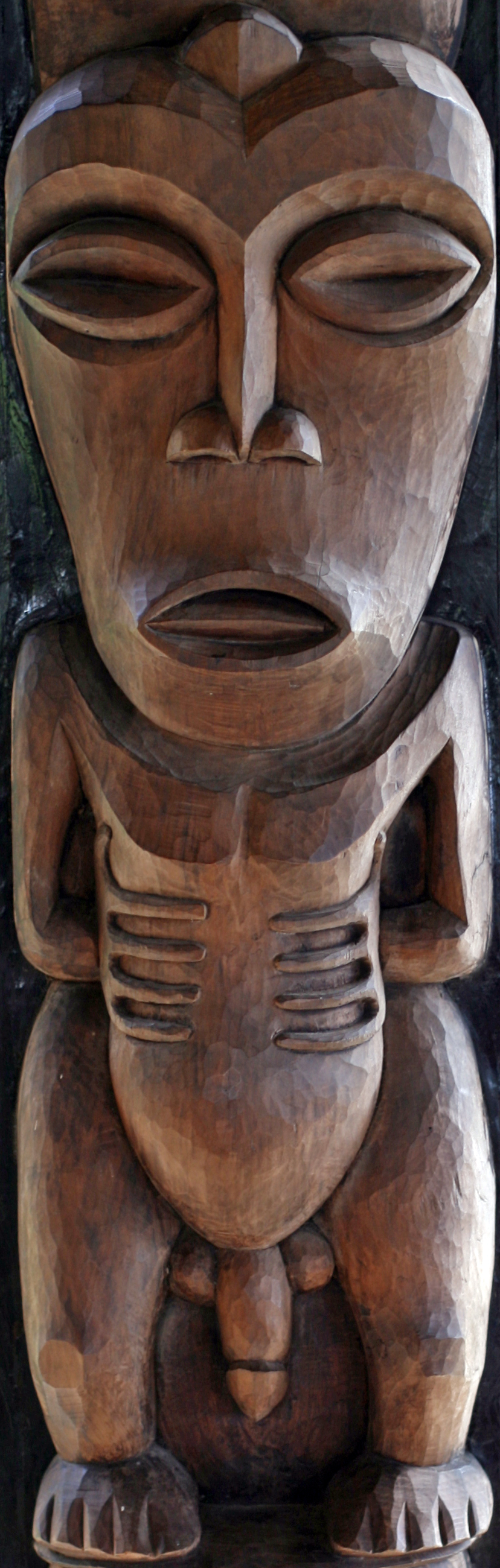
Ruanui, an ancestor of Te Aupōuri

Te Aupōuri is the second northernmost Māori iwi (tribal group), located north of Kaitaia, Northland, New Zealand, a region known as the Te Hiku o te Ika. The iwi is one of the six Muriwhenua iwi of the far north of the North Island.

The iwi of Te Aupōuri have their primary turangawaewae at Te Kao at the southern end of the Pārengarenga Harbour, with Te Oneroa-a-Tōhē (Ninety Mile Beach) to the west and Tokerau (Great Exhibition Bay) to the east. Te Aupōuri describe the core area in which they have customary rights and associations, of varying types and nature, as running from Ngāpae in the south-west, east to Ngātū and Waipapakauri Stream, north to the mouth of the Rangaunu Harbour, to Motu-puruhi and Te Rākau-tū-hakahaka (Simmonds Islands) and north to Muri-motu (North Cape), west to Te Rerenga Wairua (Cape Reinga), encompassing Oromaki, Manawa-tāwhi, Moe-kawa and Ohau (Three Kings Islands), south to Motu-o-Pao (Cape Maria van Diemen), to Kahokawa (Scotts Point), Matapia, Waka-te-hāua (The Bluff), Hukatere and back to Ngāpae. Te Aupōuri also maintain historical associations to Rangitāhua (Raoul Island in the Kermadec Islands) and south to Waimimiha. Other iwi of Te Hiku o Te Ika also claim customary interests in this area.

== History ==
=== The ancestral legend ===
In Māori, Te Aupouri means "The Dark Smoke" (au = smoke, pōuri = dark). According to legend, the Te Aupōuri came into conflict with Te Rarawa. The battle between the two eventually caused two other chieftains, Te Ikanui and Wheru, to become besieged in their pā in Pawarenga on Whangape Harbour. To mask their escape, they burnt their possessions and escaped under the cover of the smoke.

This is the iwi's chant:

Ko Tawhitirahi te maunga
Ko Te Awapoka te awa
Ko Pārengarenga te moana
Ko Pōtahi te marae
Ko Waimirirangi te wharehui
Ko Te Rongopātūtaonga te wharekai
Ko Te Kao te kāinga
Ko Te Aupōuri te iwi
Tīhewa mauri ora

Translation:

Tawhitirahi is the mountain
Te Awapoka is the river
Pārengarenga is the sea
Pōtahi is the gathering place
Waimirirangi is the meeting hall
Rongopātūtaonga is the eating hall
Te Kao is the settlement
Te Aupōuri is the tribe
It is life

=== Muriwhenua links ===
Te Aupōuri are one of the five iwi of Muriwhenua, also known as Te Hiku o te Ika a Māui, the Far North of Aotearoa.

The people of Te Aupōuri share a number of well-known ancestors with wider Muriwhenua including:

- Kupe of the Mata-whao-rua canoe and Te Ngaki of the Tāwhiri-rangi canoe;
- Nukutawhiti of the Ngā-toki-mata-whao-rua canoe;
- Ruanui-a-Tāne of the Māmari canoe and his wife Manawa-a-rangi;
- Whakatau of the Mahuhu-ki-te-rangi canoe;
- Pō-hurihanga of the Kurahaupō canoe and his wife Maieke;
- Tū-moana of the Tinana canoe and his wives Pare-waha-ariki and Kahukura-ariki;
- Te Parata of the Māmaru canoe and his wife Kahu-tia-nui;
- Tōhē and Te Kura-a-rangi;
- Tū-mata-hina and Tangi-rere;
- Rāhiri, Āhua-iti and Whakaruru;
- Ue-oneone and Rei-tū;
- Kai-rewa and Wai-miri-rangi;
- Toa-kai, Tū-kotia and Tara-whati;
- Hāiti-tai-marangai and Puna;
- Tū-whakatere, Tū-te-rangi-a-tohia and Tū-poia; and
- Moko-hōrea and Uru-te-kawa.

From these ancestors descend two families from which Te Aupōuri as an independent iwi trace their descent: Firstly, the family of Mōre Te Korohunga and Te Awa. The name ‘Te Aupōuri’ came about from an event in the time of Mōre Te Korohunga and Te Awa's children – Kupe, Whēru, Te Ikanui, Te Kakati and Te Uruhāpainga, and Secondly, the family of Te Ihupango and Te Amongaariki II, who had two daughters – Tihe and Kohine. Te Amongaariki II is especially important to Te Aupōuri being the principal ancestress of the Te Kao lands and the southern Pārengarenga Harbour. Mōre Te Korohunga & Te Awa's son, Te Ikanui, married Te Ihupango & Te Amongaariki II's daughters, Tihe & Kohine. These are the ancestors of the Te Aupōuri people of Te Kao – “Ngā Uri O Te Ikanui”.

=== Ruanui and the Polynesian rats ===
According to the traditions of the Aotea, Horouta and Māmari ancestral canoes, kiore (Polynesian rats) were passengers on their voyages from Hawaiki to New Zealand. Carvings on a window frame of Te Ōhākī marae at Ahipara depict the story of Ruanui's rat, Ruanui being the captain of the Māmari canoe. On arriving in Hokianga Harbour, he released his rats onto an island now called Motukiore "rat island".

== Radio ==
Te Reo Irirangi o Te Hiku o Te Ika, an iwi radio station, serves Te Aupōuri and other Muriwhenua tribes of the Far North. It broadcasts a main station on 97.1 FM, an urban contemporary station Sunshine FM on 104.3 FM and a youth-oriented station Tai FM.

== Notable people ==
- Sir Kīngi Īhaka, Māori bureaucrat
- Hone Harawira, Former NZ Member of Parliament
- Shane Jones, Politician
- Raniera Harrison, Journalist
- Matiu Walters, Musician, Lead singer of Six60
- Ralph Hotere, Artist
- Don Selwyn, Actor and filmmaker
- Stacey Jones, Rugby league player
- Anika Moa, Singer
- Tina Cross, Singer
- Mitch Evans, Racing car driver
- Dr. Hinemoa Elder, Youth forensic psychiatrist
- Makarena Dudley, Psychologist
- Mariameno Kapa-Kingi, Member of Parliament
