= Ngāti Tūrangitukua =

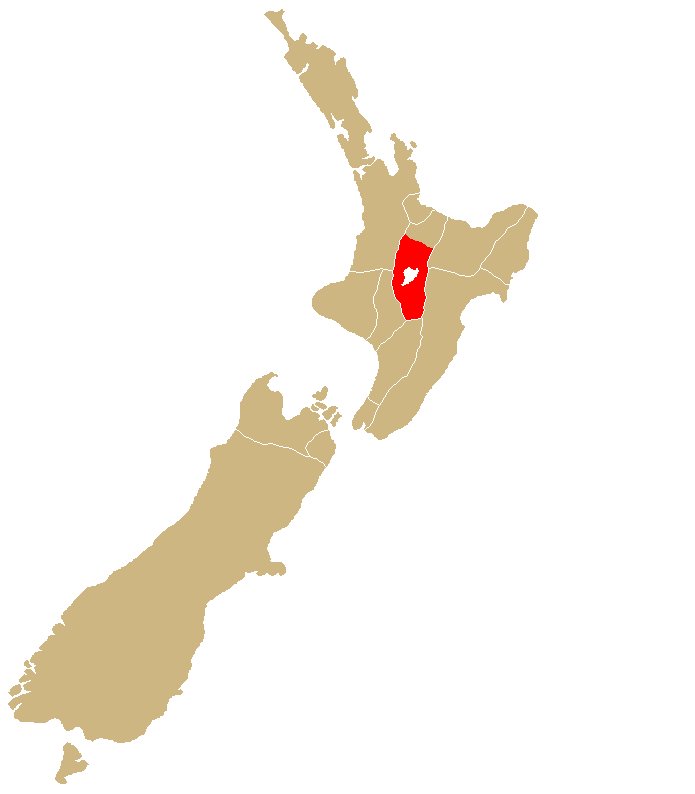
- Location: Tūrangi, North Island
- Descended from: Iwi: Ngāti Tūwharetoa; Waka: Arawa

Ngāti Tūrangitukua is a Māori iwi (tribe) in Tūrangi, New Zealand. It is a hapū (sub-tribe) of the Ngāti Tūwharetoa iwi.

In 1998, the iwi received an apology and $5,000,000 from the New Zealand Crown as settlement for claims relating to the Treaty of Waitangi.

== Media ==
=== Tuwharetoa FM ===
Tuwharetoa FM is the official radio station of the people of Ngāti Tūwharetoa. It began at Waiariki Polytechnic in Tūrangi in February 1991, was taken off air in late 1992, relaunched in 1993, and added a frequency reaching as far as Taumarunui. An off-shot station, Tahi FM, began in February 1993 but is no longer operating. Tuwharetoa FM broadcasts on 97.2 FM in Tūrangi, and 95.1 FM in the areas of Taumarunui, National Park, Whakapapa and Raetihi.
