= Māmari =

Ocean-going and voyaging canoe

- Great Māori migration waka
- Commander: Ruanui
- Departed from: Hawaiki
- Landed at: Hokianga Harbour
- Iwi: Ngā Puhi, Te Aupōuri, Te Rarawa

In Māori tradition, Māmari was one of the great ocean-going, voyaging canoes that was used in the migrations that settled New Zealand.

Māmari was the third waka to arrive with the tangata Ruanui. The traditions of the Aotea, Horotua and Māmari waka mention that kiore (rats) were passengers on their voyages to New Zealand. Carvings on a window frame of Te Ohaki Marae in Ahipara depict the story of Ruanui's kiore. When he arrived into the Hokianga Harbour, he released them onto an island called Motukiore (rat island).

== See also ==
- List of Māori waka
