= Tinana =

- Great Māori migration waka
- Commander: Tūmoana, Te Parata
- Iwi: Te Rarawa, Ngāti Kahu

In Māori tradition, Tinana (also known as Te Mamaru) was one of the great ocean-going, voyaging canoes that was used in the migrations that settled New Zealand.

The Tinana canoe, later renamed Te Māmaru, is particularly important for the Muriwhenua tribes of Te Rarawa and Ngāti Kahu. The Tinana, captained by Tūmoana, landed at Tauroa Point near present-day Ahipara. The canoe later returned to Hawaiki where Tūmoana's nephew, Te Parata, renamed it Te Māmaru. It was then brought back to Muriwhenua, its crew first sighting land at Pūwheke Mountain on the Karikari Peninsula, before sailing around Rangiāwhiao and Whatuwhiwhi to make landfall at Te Ikateretere, near the mouth of the Taipā River. Te Parata married Kahutianui-a-te-rangi, who is the founding ancestor of Ngāti Kahu.

== See also ==
- List of Māori waka
