= Ngāti Kahungunu ki Wairarapa =

Māori iwi (tribe) in Aotearoa New Zealand

- Iwi (tribe) in Māoridom
- Rohe (region): Wairarapa
- Waka (canoe): Tākitimu
- Population: 11,514 (2018)

Ngāti Kahungunu ki Wairarapa is a tribal division within the Māori iwi (tribe) of Ngāti Kahungunu in the south-east of New Zealand's North Island. It consists of a number of hapū (sub-tribes) located within the rohe (tribal area) north of the Remutaka Range in the Wairarapa geographic region.

Ngāti Kahungunu ki Wairarapa is one of six divisions within the tribe. Ngāti Kahungunu ki Tamakinui a Rua is located immediately north. Ngāti Kahungunu ki Heretaunga, Ngāti Kahungunu ki Tamatea, Ngāti Kahungunu ki Te Whanganui-a-Orotu and Ngāti Kahungunu ki Te Wairoa are located further north. The Wairoa, Heretaunga and Wairarapa divisions are traditionally larger than the other three divisions.

== See also ==
- List of Māori iwi
