= Tokomaru (canoe) =

Māori migration canoe

- Great Māori migration waka
- Commander: Manaia
- Landed at: Whangaparaoa
- Iwi: Te Āti Awa, Ngāti Mutunga, Ngāti Tama
- Settled at: Taranaki

In Māori tradition, Tokomaru was one of the great ocean-going canoes that were used in the migrations that settled New Zealand. It was commanded by Manaia. His brother-in-law had originally owned the canoe. When Manaia's wife was raped by a group of men, he slew them, including the chief Tupenu. Killing his brother-in-law, he took the Tokomaru and set sail with his family for New Zealand. Landing at Whangaparaoa, they finally settled at Taranaki. Te Āti Awa, Ngāti Mutunga, Ngāti Tama iwi trace their ancestry back to Tokomaru.

== Railcar ==
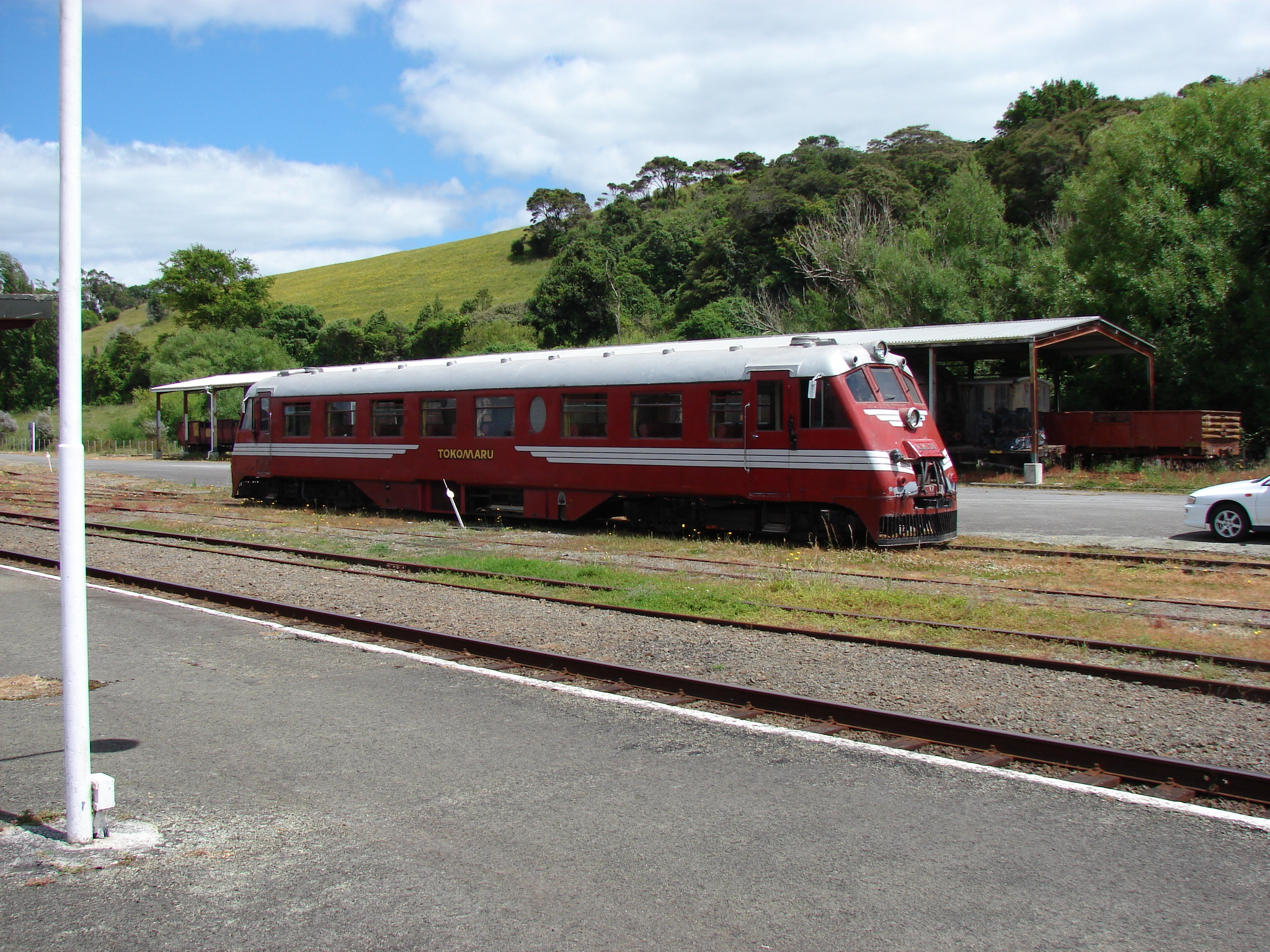
NZR Standard class railcar, named Tokomaru after the Māori migration canoe

In 1938, New Zealand Government Railways (NZR) introduced the Standard class railcars, naming one "Tokomaru" after the Māori migration canoe.

== See also ==
- List of Māori waka
