= Ngāti Rāhiri Tumutumu =

Māori iwi (tribe) in New Zealand

Ngāti Tumutumu
- Iwi (tribe) in Māoridom
- Rohe (region): Te Aroha, Hauraki

Ngāti Tumutumu is a Māori iwi of New Zealand, named after the eponymous ancestor Te Ruinga, son of Tumutumu. They live at Te Aroha in the Hauraki District.

== See also ==
- List of Māori iwi
