= Ngāti Tara Tokanui =

Māori iwi (tribe) in New Zealand

- Iwi (tribe) in Māoridom
- Rohe (region): Paeroa
- Waka (canoe): Tainui
- Moana (harbour/lake): Tikapa
- Maunga (mountain): Moehau, Te Aroha
- Awa (river): Ohinemuri
- Population: Approx. 540 (2013)

Ngāti Tara Tokanui is a Māori iwi of New Zealand formed from Ngāti Tara (also known as Ngāti Koi) and Ngāti Tokanui.

== Treaty settlement ==
Deed of Settlement was signed on 28 July 2022 after 13 years of negotiation. The deed saw nine culturally significant sites returned to the iwi, including Ngā Ure Tara, Mimitu Pā, Tawhitiaraia and Karangahake. As well as a compensation payout of $6 million and an apology from the crown for the confiscation of large tracts of land, as well as for its policies and laws that designed to dislocate Ngāti Tara Tokanui from their land and erode their tribal structure.

== See also ==
- List of Māori iwi
