= Te Rangiuamutu =

One of the great canoes used during the Māori migration to New Zealand

- Great Māori migration waka
- Commander: Tamatearokai
- Iwi: Ngāti Ruanui, Ngā Rauru

In Māori tradition, Te Rangiuamutu (also known as Tairea) was one of the great ocean-going, voyaging canoes that was used in the migrations that settled New Zealand. Taranaki iwi Ngāti Ruanui and Ngā Rauru link their ancestry to Tamatearokai the captain of Te Rangiuamutu.

== See also ==
- List of Māori waka
