= Ngātiwai =

Māori iwi (tribe) in Aotearoa New Zealand

- Iwi (tribe) in Māoridom
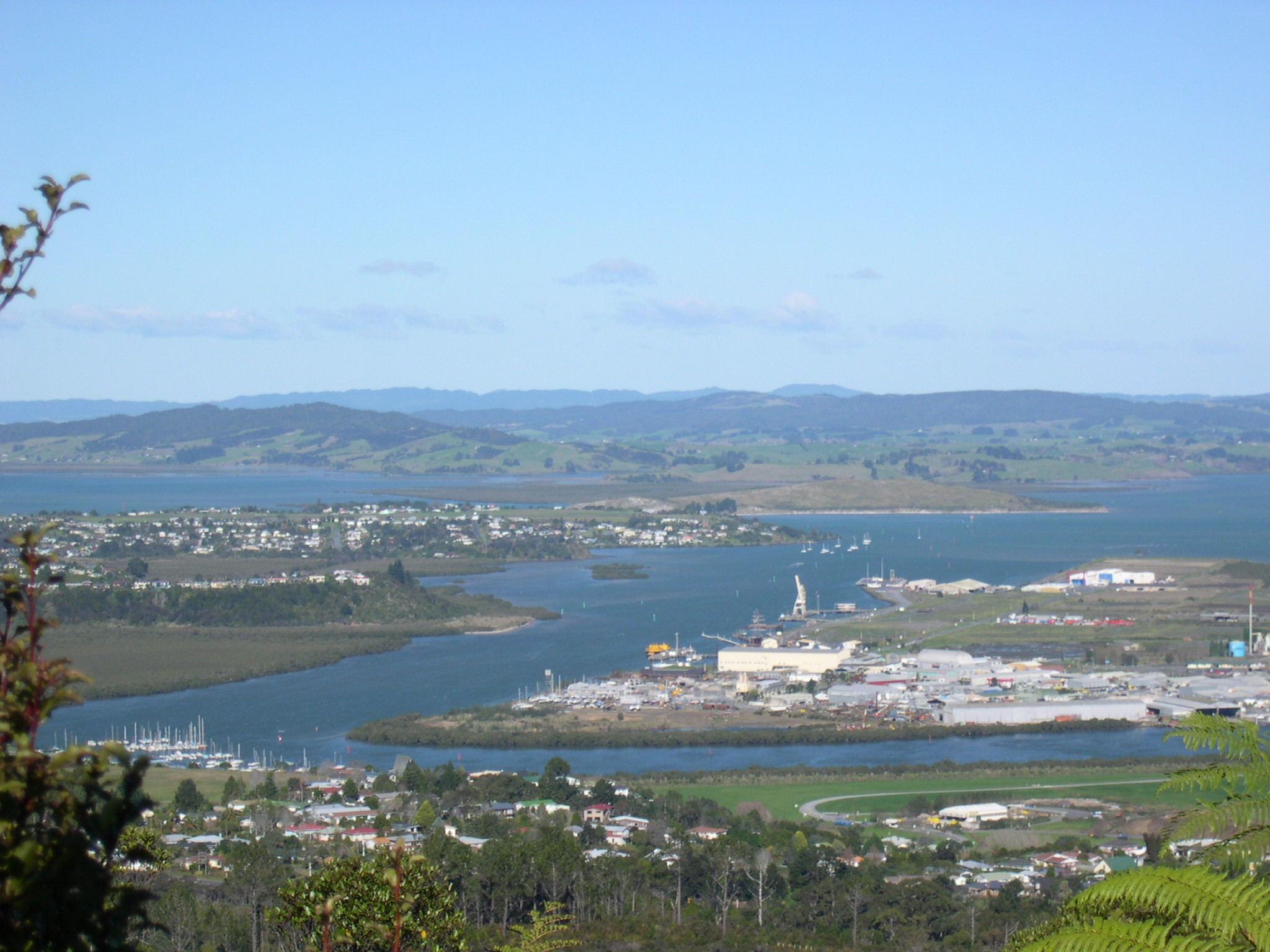
- Whangarei Harbour

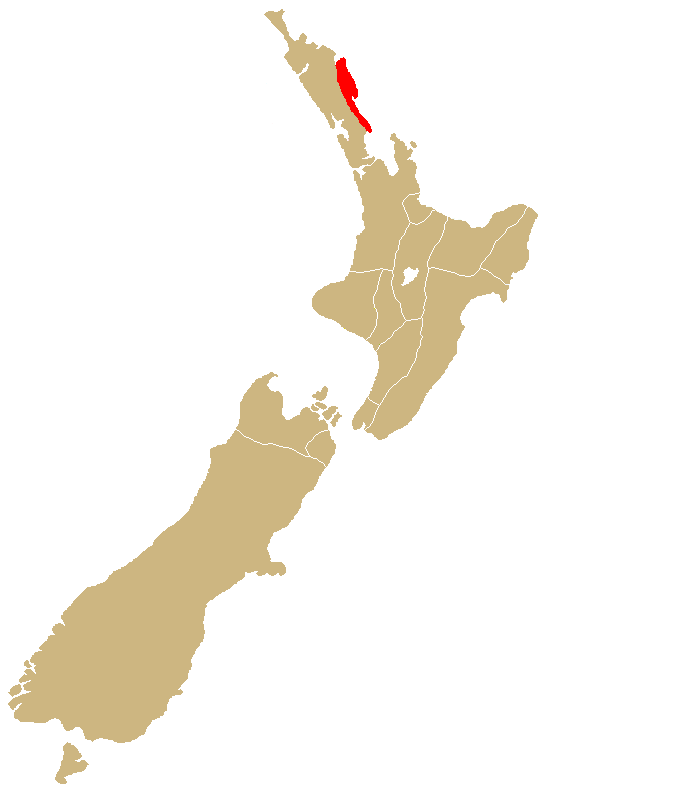
- Rohe (region): Northland, Great Barrier Island, Little Barrier Island
- Waka (canoe): Māhuhu-ki-te-rangi, Ruakaramea, Tainui

Ngātiwai or Ngāti Wai is a Māori iwi of the east coast of the Northland Region of New Zealand. Its historical tribal area or rohe stretched from Cape Brett in the north to Takatū Point on Tawharanui Peninsula in the south and out to Great Barrier Island, the Poor Knights Islands and other offshore islands.

Notable descendants of Ngātiwai include brothers Jim, Ian and Winston Peters, artist Shona Rapira Davies, and writer Paula Morris.

== History ==
=== Early history ===
Ngātiwai trace their ancestry to one of the earliest settlers of Te Tai-tokerau, Manaia, who was, according to legend, transformed into stone, with his family and servant Paekō, atop Mount Manaia beside Whangārei Harbour. His descendant Manaia II, some 14 generations later, was the rangatira of Ngāti Manaia established.

Following a battle with Ngāpuhi at their pā at Mimiwhāngata, Ngāti Manaia fled out to sea, along the eastern coast, and on to the offshore islands. They became adept seafarers and were known as Ngātiwai-ki-te-moana under the leadership of Te Rangihōkaia and siblings Torematao and Te Rangapū.

Known for their ocean traditions and customs and coastal raiding, Ngātiwai ("descendants of the sea") were often accompanied by a guardian sea-hawk or Tūkaiaia, whereby other tribes would be warned that Ngātiwai were on the move – either at sea or on land.

The iwi has become associated with Ngāpuhi.

=== Tribal links and movement ===
After the time of Te Rangihōkaia, a descendant of Manaia, a number of key marriages cemented the relationship between Ngātiwai and the Kawerau hapū of Ngāti Rehua and Ngāti Manuhiri. During the late 1700s and early 1800s the Ngāpuhi tribes pushed east toward Kawakawa, Te Rāwhiti and the Whangaruru coast, where they absorbed other tribes, including Ngāti Manu, Te Kapotai, Te Uri o Rata, Ngare Raumati and Ngātiwai.

=== Modern history ===
In April 2006, Ngātiwai sued the Department of Conservation over its handling of consultation issues in Northland regarding a marine reserve.

== Notable people ==
- Aperahama Edwards
- Briar Grace-Smith, writer
- Laly Haddon, Māori All Black
- Paula Morris, writer
- Tracey Panek, historian and archivist
- Ian Peters, politician
- Jim Peters, politician
- Winston Peters, politician
- Shona Rapira Davies, artist
- Shane Reti, politician
- Paratene Te Manu, chief and warrior

== See also ==
- List of Māori iwi
