= Reweti =

Reweti is a locality in the North Island of New Zealand, Reweti may also refer to:

== People ==
- Reweti Arapere (born 1984), New Zealand illustrator, sculptor and painter
- Rēweti Kōhere (1871–1954), New Zealand Anglican clergyman, newspaper journalist and editor
- Bridget Reweti, New Zealand photographer and moving image artist
- Ngapipi Reweti (1883–1957), land negotiator of the New Zealand Māori iwi (tribe) of Ngāti Whātua
- Paraone Reweti (1916–1996), New Zealand politician

== Places ==
- Reweti, a marae in the Auckland Region, New Zealand
