= Horouta =

Polynesian migration Waka

In Māori tradition, the canoe Horouta was one of the great ocean-going canoes in which Polynesians migrated to New Zealand approximately 800 years ago.

The story goes that Kahukura, a man from Hawaiki, introduced kūmara (sweet potato), to the locals who had never had anything like it before. In order to obtain more kūmara from Hawaiki, Toi gave the canoe to Kahukura. Upon gathering the coveted vegetables, Kahukura sent them back on Horouta, commanded by Pāoa (or Pāwa).

According to Ngāti Kahungunu tradition Pāwa captained Horouta and Kiwa was the tohunga. J. H. Mitchell has written that Horouta reached New Zealand around 100 years before the main body of canoes, which arrived around 1350. Horouta called at different places along the East Coast until it was beached at Gisborne. Kiwa was the first to set foot on the land, according to custom. The place was thereafter known as Turanganui a Kiwa, or the standing place of Kiwa, and the name was later extended to include the whole of the Poverty Bay flats area.

Rongowhakaata Halbert wrote a history of Horouta, published posthumously in 1999.

== See also ==
- List of Māori waka
