= Ngāti Manuhiri =

Māori iwi (tribe) of Aotearoa (New Zealand)

- Iwi (tribe) in Māoridom
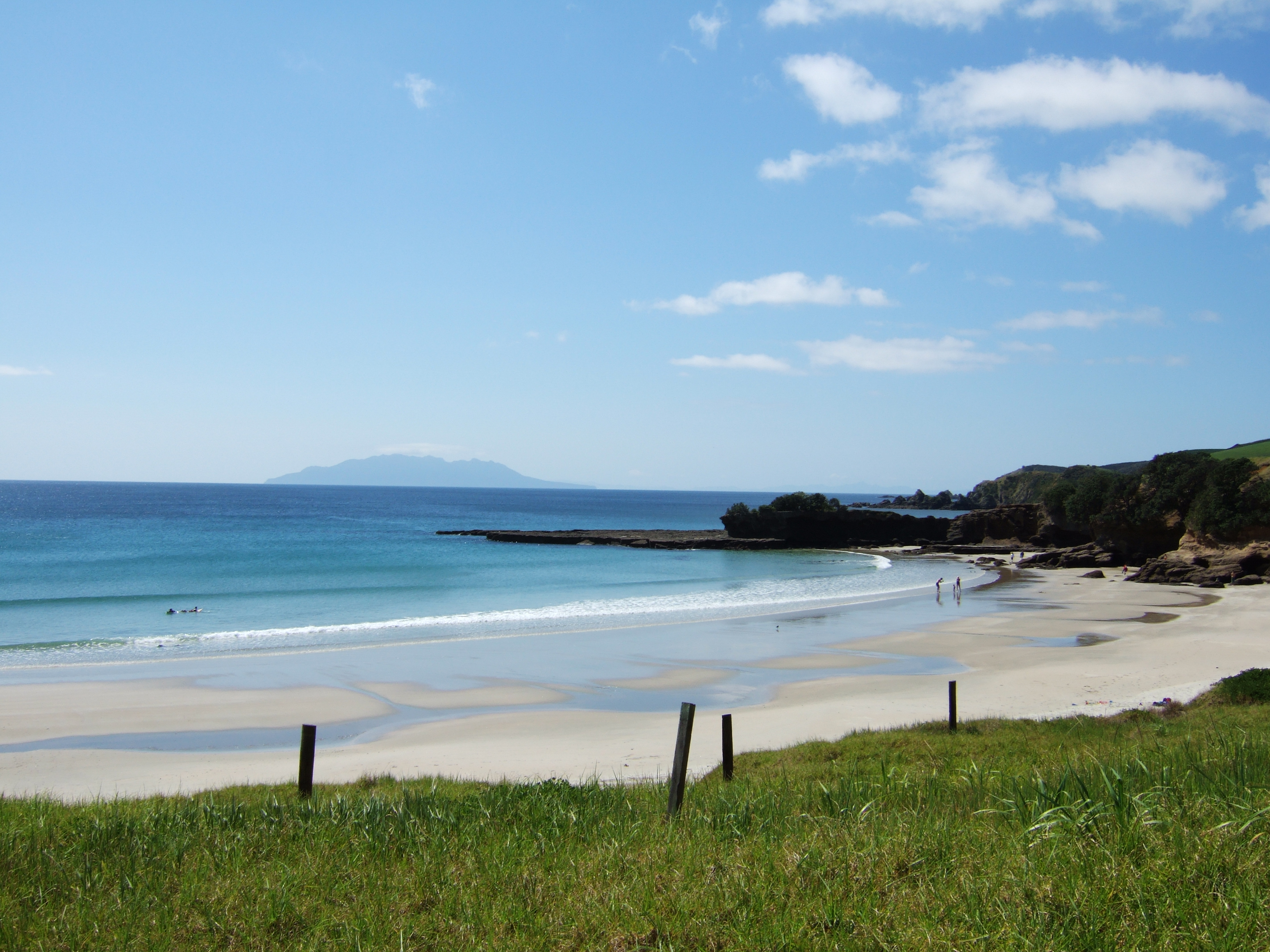
- Tawharanui Regional Park
- Waka (canoe): Moekākara, Tainui

Ngāti Manuhiri is a Māori iwi of the Mahurangi Peninsula area of New Zealand. They have an interest in the region from the Ōkura River in the south to Mangawhai in the north, and extending out to Great Barrier Island. They are descended from Manuhiri, one of the sons of Maki, founder of the Te Kawerau iwi. They have a marae near Leigh.

The iwi is descended from the Moekākara and Tainui waka (arrival canoes).

== See also ==
- List of Māori iwi
