= Ruakaramea =

Māori voyaging canoe

- Great Māori migration waka
- Commander: Mirupokai
- Priest: Rangitaupe
- Landed at: Herekino
- Iwi: Ngati Miru

In Māori tradition, Ruakaramea was one of the great ocean-going, voyaging canoes that was used in the migrations that settled New Zealand. It was said to be captained by Mirupokai eponymous ancestor of the Ngāti Miru tribe who inhabited the Northern part of New Zealand. Mirupokai was a very strategic and influential leader and aligned his many unions with those of high ranking 'mana' from other neighbouring tribes. Many of his remnants have settled around the Western coast of the Far North island of New Zealand, mainly around the Herekino and Whangape Harbours.

== See also ==
- List of Māori waka
