= Te Wakatūwhenua =

Voyaging canoe in Māori tradition

- Great Māori migration waka

In Māori tradition, Te Wakatūwhenua was one of the great ocean-going, voyaging canoes that were used in the migrations that settled New Zealand. Te Wakatūwhenua is said to have landed at Cape Rodney (just north of Leigh), its crew suffering a mysterious illness.

== See also ==
- List of Māori waka
