= Māhuhu-ki-te-rangi =

- Great Māori migration waka
- Commander: Rongomai / Whakatau
- Iwi: Ngāpuhi, Ngāti Whātua, Te Rarawa, Ngātiwai

In Māori tradition, Māhuhu-ki-te-rangi (also known as Māhuhu) was one of the great ocean voyaging waka (canoes) that were used in the migrations that settled New Zealand. According to Māori traditions, Māhuhu-ki-te-rangi explored the upper reaches of the North Island, north of the Kaipara Harbour, during early Māori settlement of New Zealand.

The waka first arrived on the east coast of Northland, where its crew took it exploring Whangaroa, Tākou and Whangaruru. Some legends say it continued south to the Bay of Plenty and East Coast. It returned north to Pārengarenga and then sailed around North Cape and down the west coast.

On the west coast there are two narratives of the captaincy of Māhuhu. Te Roroa people of the Waipoua forest say it was captained by Whakatau and called at Kawerua, between the Hokianga Harbour and the Waipoua River, where Whakatau's son Rongomai married a local. The alternative narrative, told by the Te Uri-o-Hau and Te Taoū (from the Ngāti Whātua tribe of Helensville and Auckland), has Māhuhu under the command of Rongomai and stopping, not at Kawerua, but Tāporapora, a peninsula near the mouth of the Kaipara Harbour (this place no longer exists). Rongomai was drowned while fishing there and his body was eaten by araara or trevally fish. Because of this incident, the Ngā Puhi and Te Rarawa iwi, who claim descent from Rongomai, did not dare to eat the trevally in the times before they embraced Christianity. The tradition then tells of Māhuhu heading back north to Rangaunu Harbour, where the crew settled and the waka was buried in a creek, Te Waipopo-o-Māhuhu, in Rangaunu Harbour.

As part of the 1990 commemorations of the 1840 signing of the Treaty of Waitangi, Ngāti Whātua made a large waka that also bears the name Māhuhu-ki-te-rangi or Māhuhu-o-te-rangi.

== See also ==
- List of Māori waka
