= Ngā Rauru =

Māori iwi (tribe) in Aotearoa New Zealand

- Iwi (tribe) in Māoridom
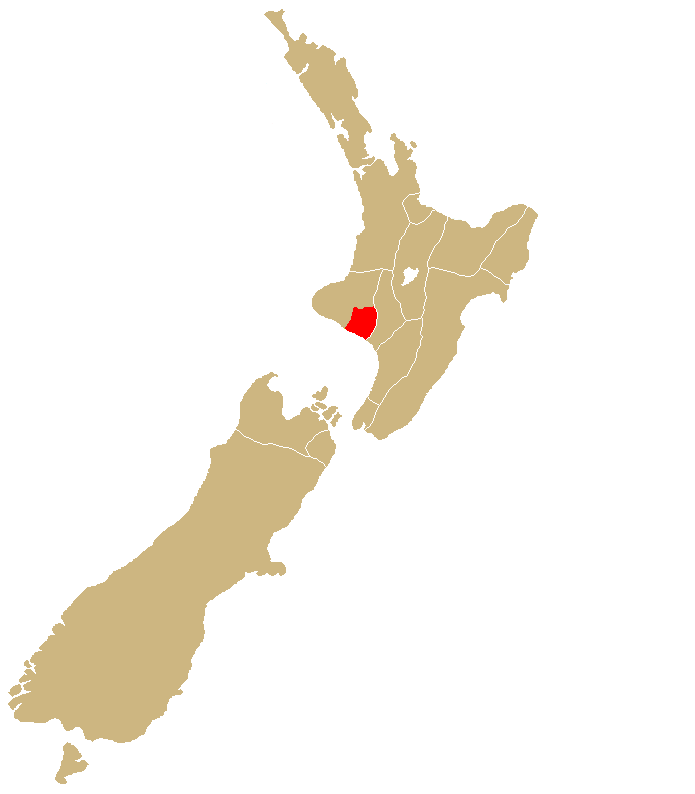
- Rohe (region): South Taranaki
- Waka (canoe): Te Rangiuamutu, Aotea
- Population: 4,047

Ngā Rauru (also Ngā Rauru Kītahi) is a Māori iwi in the South Taranaki region of New Zealand. In the 2006 census, 4,047 Māori claimed affiliation to Ngā Rauru, representing 12 hapū.

== History ==
=== Early history ===
The early history of Ngā Rauru kitahī starts before the coming of the Te Kāhui Rere, a Māori tribe that is situated in the South Taranaki area. The iwi takes its name from Rauru Kītahi, a Māori warrior who, after travelling extensively throughout New Zealand, settled in the south Taranaki region. Rauru Kītahi was the first son of Ruarangi and Rongoueroa (see History of Te Āti Awa), and a descendant of Toi-te-huatahi. Awanuiarangi, the founding ancestor of Te Āti Awa, was Rauru's half-brother.

=== Tribal and New Zealand Wars ===
In the early 19th century, northern iwi including Ngā Puhi and Ngāti Toa fought other Māori iwi in campaigns throughout the North Island, armed with European muskets. Ngā Rauru came under attack from Ngāti Toa in 1822, and from Ngāti Tuwharetoa in the 1840s. The last conflict of the Musket Wars occurred at Te Ihupuku Pā in 1845, with Ngāti Tuwharetoa being convinced by the Anglican Bishop of New Zealand and an army major to return to Taupō without a shot being fired.

Initial trade relations with Europeans were profitable. In the 1850s divisions emerged within tribes across Taranaki over land sales to the government. This eventually led to the New Zealand Wars, starting in Taranaki. As a result, 607 square kilometres was confiscated from Ngā Rauru by Crown troops. In 1868, Ngā Rauru supported the Ngāti Ruanui leader Tītokowaru against Crown troops. In response, Crown troops destroyed and confiscated more Ngā Rauru land, devastating the economy of the iwi. Subsequent loss of control of Ngā Rauru land occurred through improper land title acquisitions by the New Zealand Government.

Some redress was attempted by the New Zealand Government. Some land was returned to Māori control, but under perpetual lease by the Public Trustee, and ignoring traditional collective Māori title. The Sim Commission of 1926–1927 attempted to compensate Taranaki iwi including Ngā Rauru, but this was seen by many iwi as insufficient, conducted with little or no consultation with Taranaki iwi.

=== Crown settlement ===
In 1991, Ngā Rauru submitted its claims to the Waitangi Tribunal. In 1996, the tribunal released The Taranaki Report: Kaupapa Tuatahi, which examined past government attempts at redress. In 2000, Ngā Rauru entered into negotiations with the New Zealand Government towards a Deed of Settlement. The final settlement was ratified and signed on 27 November 2003. The settlement included:

- A formal acknowledgement and apology for crown violations of the Treaty of Waitangi
- An agreed historical account of Ngā Rauru during the New Zealand Wars
- Cultural redress through rights to land management and rights-of-first-refusal to purchase government-owned land
- Financial compensation totalling NZ$31 million.

The settlement was enacted with the passing of the Ngaa Rauru Kiitahi Claims Settlement Act 2005.

== Ngā Rauru today ==
=== Administration ===
The Ngā Rauru Iwi Authority manages the affairs of the iwi and represents it in negotiations with the New Zealand Government. With the Deed of Settlement now concluded, Ngā Rauru are moving ahead with economic development and plans to revitalise Māori language use. In particular, the Matauranga Unit of the Ngā Rauru Iwi Authority was established to compile, collect and preserve information pertaining to whakapapa and the Deed of Settlement, as part of a larger effort to revitalise Ngā Rauru culture, history and identity.

=== Radio station ===
Te Korimako O Taranaki is the radio station of Ngaa Rauru Kiitahi and other Taranaki region iwi, including: Ngāti Tama, Te Ātiawa, Ngāti Maru, Taranaki, Ngāti Mutunga, Ngāti Ruanui, Ngāruahine. It started at the Bell Block campus of Taranaki Polytechnic in 1992, and moved to the Spotswood campus in 1993. It is available on 94.8 FM across Taranaki.

== See also ==
- List of Māori iwi

== Sources ==
- Kīngi, Taituha (2006-09-26). "Ngā Rauru Kītahi". Te Ara - the Encyclopedia of New Zealand. Archived from the original on 2007-01-06.
- Deed of Settlement of the Historical Claims of Ngaa Rauru Kiitahi (PDF). New Zealand Government. 27 November 2003. Archived (PDF) from the original on 28 February 2021.
