= Moekākara =

- Great Māori migration waka

In Māori tradition, Moekākara was one of the great ocean-going, voyaging canoes that was used in the migrations that settled New Zealand. It was captained by Tāhuhunui-o-te-rangi, the ancestor of Ngāi Tāhuhu. The canoe first landed at Wakatuwhenua, near Te Ārai north of Auckland. Ngāi Tāhuhu settled at Pouerua in the Bay of Islands and the Mangakahia River in Northland, as well as Ōtāhuhu in Auckland.

== See also ==
- List of Māori waka
