= Mahurangi Peninsula =

Peninsula in Auckland Region, New Zealand

- Peninsula
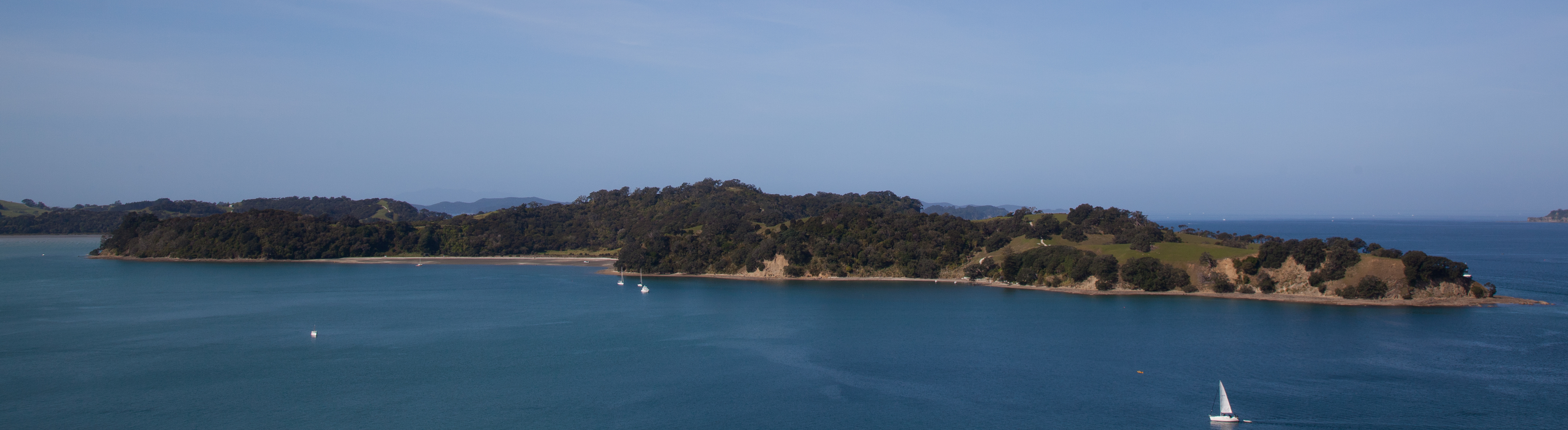
- The Mahurangi Peninsula seen from Mahurangi West

- Location within North Island
- Coordinates: 36.450°S 174.746°E
- Location: Auckland, New Zealand

Area
  - Total: 46.67 square kilometres (18.02 sq mi)

Mahurangi Peninsula is a landform in the Rodney Local Board Area in the Auckland Region of New Zealand's North Island. It is located between two bodies of water: the Mahurangi Harbour and Kawau Bay.

== Geography ==
The settlements of Snells Beach and Algies Bay are located in the northern part of the peninsula. Scandrett Regional Park is located on the eastern side of the peninsula. Scott Point is the south-western most point of the peninsula, and includes the Mahurangi Scenic Reserve, Scotts Landing and Scott Homestead.
