= Mahurangi Regional Park =

Regional park in New Zealand

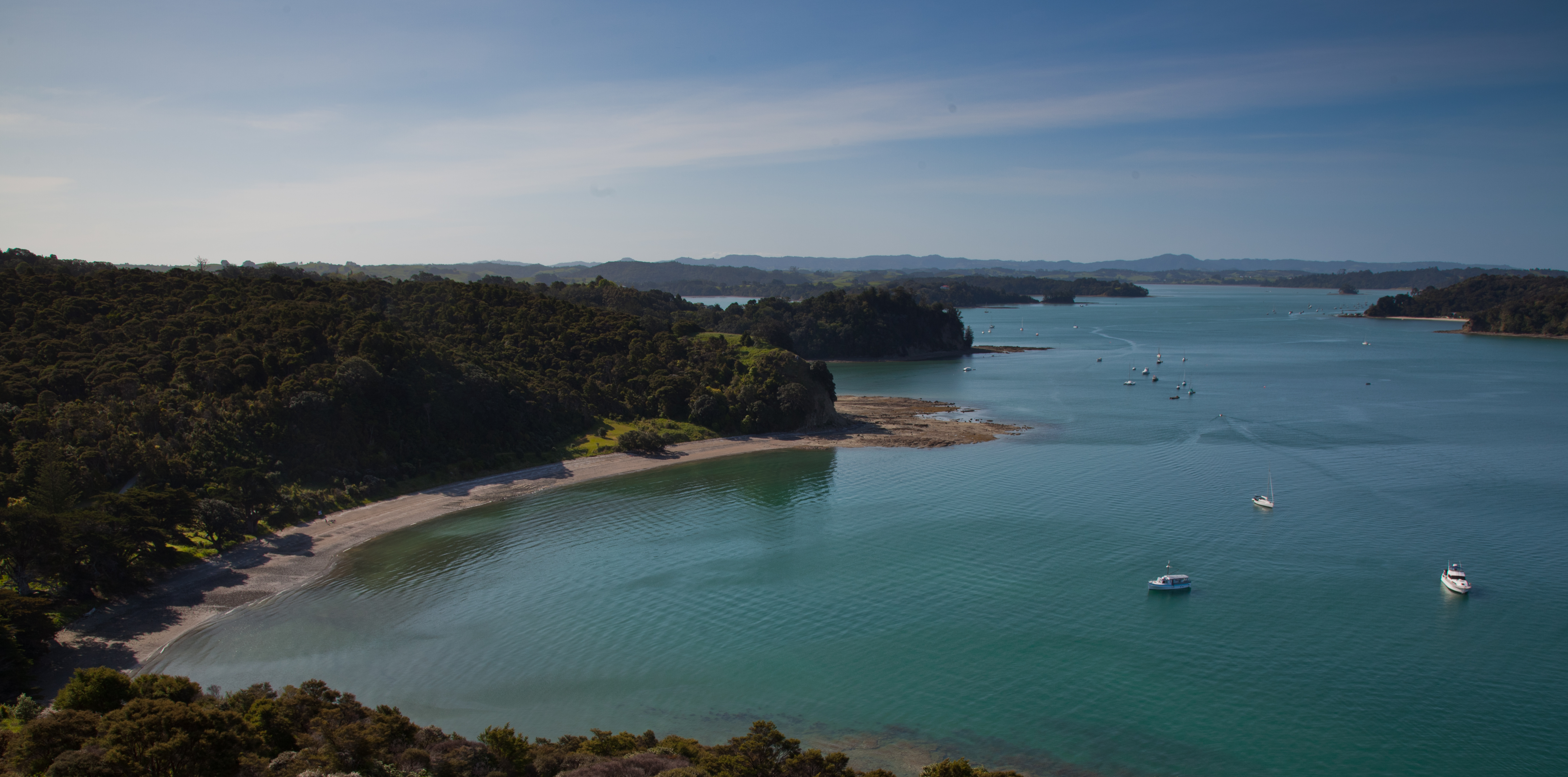
- Otuawaea Bay in the Mahurangi Regional Park
- Interactive map of Mahurangi Regional Park
- Type: Regional Park
- Location: Rodney, Auckland, New Zealand
- Coordinates: 36.5095056°S 174.7193771°E
- Area: Mahurangi East: 190 ha (1.9 km²); Mahurangi West: 100 ha (1 km²)
- Designated: 1967
- Opening: 4 September 1988
- Operator: Auckland Council
- Status: Mahurangi East: Open (but only accessible by water, apart from Scott Point); Mahurangi West: Temporarily closed

Mahurangi Regional Park is a regional park situated on the north-eastern coast of the Auckland Region of New Zealand's North Island. It is located in Rodney, north of the main Auckland urban area, and is owned and operated by Auckland Council. The park surrounds the Mahurangi Harbour and actually consists of three separate sections of land that are connected only by water. In recent years, this has resulted in the park typically being separated into two regional parks. However, all three sections of parkland maintain a shared history and are a short distance from each other by water.

== Geography ==
The park is located on either side of the entrance to the Mahurangi Harbour. Initially, the bulk of the regional park was found in Mahurangi West, with two exclaves of the park located on the eastern shores in Scotts Landing. However, the 2020 expansion of the Sadler Point exclave resulted in Auckland Council operationally regarding the east and west sides of the harbour as separate regional parks, Mahurangi East and Mahurangi West respectively.

=== Mahurangi East ===
Map of Mahurangi East Regional Park and surrounds

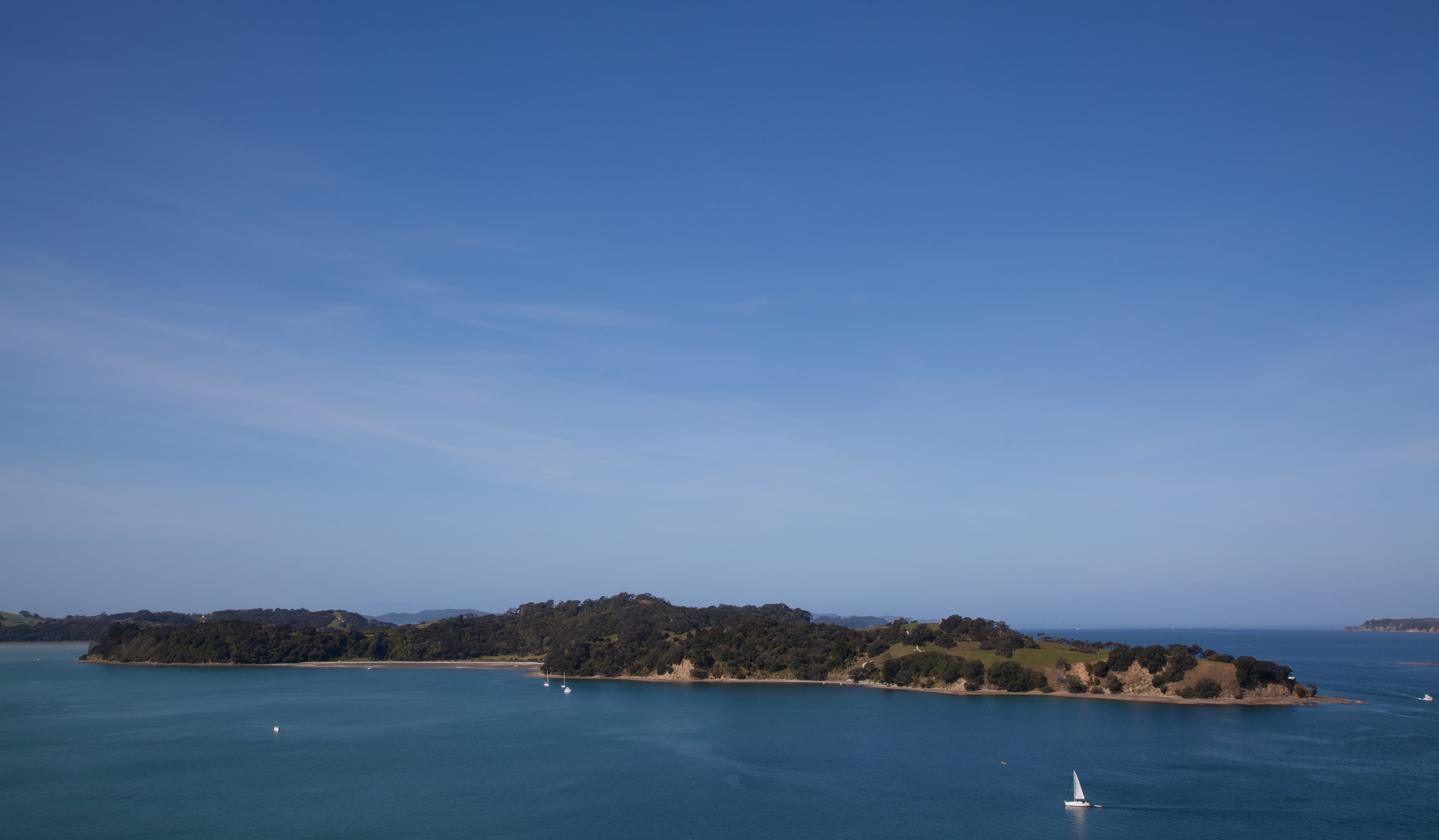
Sadler Point at Mahurangi East Regional Park, as seen from across the harbour at Mahurangi West Regional Park

Mahurangi East encompasses 190 ha of coastal land on the eastern side of the harbour, with the core of the park at Sadler Point, and an exclave at Scott Point. The Sadler Point section does not have public access by land and is only publicly accessible by water, which makes it distinctive for being remote and isolated, with few visitors. The park covers most of the southern end of the peninsula, but is neighboured, at the tip of Sadler Point, by a Department of Conservation-managed marginal strip and a private landowner. Dairy Bay is part of the DOC marginal strip/private land, but Big Bay, Lagoon Bay, and Poplar Bay are part of the regional park. Because it is situated on a peninsula, Auckland Council has identified that it may have a suitable configuration for the creation of a pest-free peninsula, like at Shakespear Regional Park and Tāwharanui Regional Park.

==== Scott Point ====
The Scott Point exclave consists of three parcels of land at the end of a separate peninsula. This park section is discontinuous and sits either side of Ridge Road, which provides access to a boat ramp at Ngaio Bay (neither the road nor the boat ramp fall within the regional park). It also sits either side of a DOC scenic reserve.

=== Mahurangi West ===
Map of Mahurangi West Regional Park and surrounds

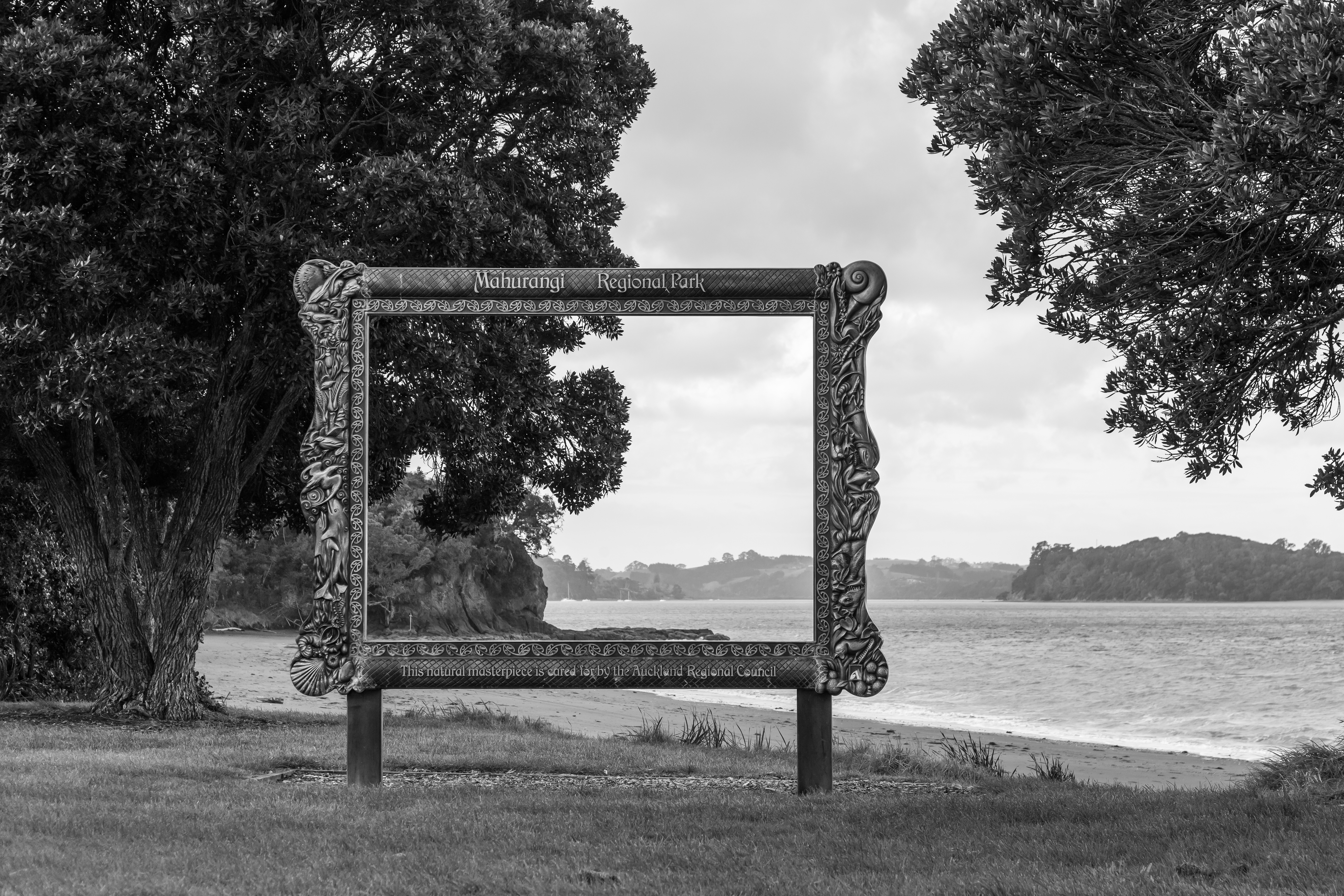
Sullivan's Bay at Mahurangi West Regional Park

Mahurangi West encompasses 100 ha of land on the western side of the harbour and extends along the coast from Ōpahi Point in the north through Ōtuawao / Mita Bay, Tungutu Point, and Ōtarawao / Sullivan's Bay to Cudlip Point in the south. The southern edge of the park is bordered by the Te Muri stream, separating it from neighboring Te Muri Regional Park. Sullivan's Bay is the main area of the park, where visitors arrive, and provides walking access to the rest of the park.

== History ==
The Auckland Regional Planning Authority and its successor, the Auckland Regional Authority, began exploring options for a regional reserve in Mahurangi in the 1960s. In October 1967, the acquisition process under the Public Works Act 1928 began for six properties, which culminated in 81 ha of parkland being purchased. The land acquired, including Te Muri Beach which is now part of neighboring Te Muri Regional Park, cost $230,740 in total. Many of the landowners that the authority purchased land from were not willing sellers, due to the land having been in their families for many generations. Sullivan's Bay was purchased from a Māori family who had lived on the land for at least 350 years.

The reserve was officially opened as a regional park on 4 September 1988 by the Governor-General, Paul Reeves. The ceremony included a hāngi prepared by the Sullivan family, who Sullivan's Bay had been purchased from, along with the unveiling of a memorial plaque.

In 2020, Auckland Council completed a $12 million land purchase for 95 ha to extend the park at the Sadler Point exclave on the eastern side of the harbour. The land was purchased from the Nichol and Becroft families, with 45% of the cost covered by the John and Margaret Turnbull Trust and the rest covered by the council.

As of 2026, the Mahurangi West section has been closed to the public since January due to a slip on Mahurangi West Road that was caused by heavy rainfall. While the road is being repaired it is a single lane that is restricted to residents only, meaning that the park section is not publicly accessible by road.

== Facilities and recreation ==
=== Walking ===
Mahurangi West has two main walking tracks. The 2.1km Mita Bay Loop Track goes through the northern areas of the park, connecting Tungutu Point and Mita Bay, on a 2 hour return to the main carpark at Sullivan's Bay. The 3km Cudlip Point Loop track, meanwhile, serves the southern areas of the park, connecting Cudlip Point, on a 2 hour return to Sullivan's Bay. A third walking track connects the park to neighbouring Te Muri Regional Park at low tide.

=== Buildings ===
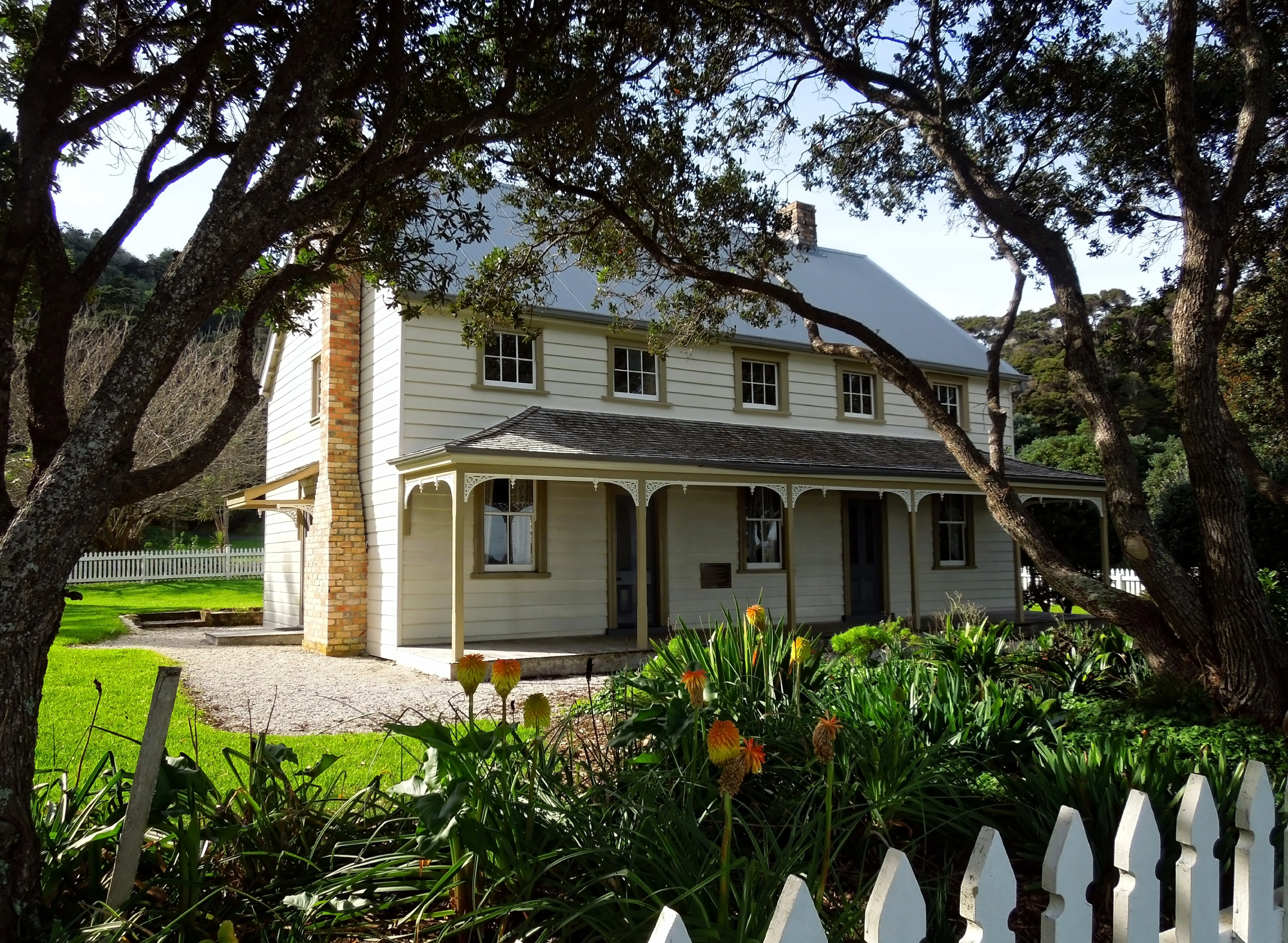
Scott Homestead

Scott Homestead is a historic building located at Scott Point and is a 19th century coastal boarding house that was built by Thomas Scott Jr in 1877. It is one of the oldest buildings on the Mahurangi Harbour and was used by the Scott family as accommodation for tourists visiting the Mahurangi Regatta and Waiwera Hot Springs during the summer. The homestead is a bookable facility for meetings and events, with a capacity of 100 people. Located nearby is Bailey Cottage, which is bookable bach-style accommodation.

The Vine House is a 1950s farmhouse on the western side of the Sadler Point peninsula and is bookable accommodation. Nearby, at Big Bay on the eastern side is Big Bay Bach, which is also bookable accommodation. When the Sadler Point section was expanded in 2020, a four-bedroom bach built by the Becroft family was included in the acquisition, which may be turned into bookable accommodation in the future.

Across the harbour at Mahurangi West is Sullivan Homestead, a historic building built in 1875 by sea captain, John Sullivan, for whom the bay is named after.

=== Campgrounds ===
The Lagoon Bay campground is located on a beachfront site at Sadler Point in the eastern section. It has no vehicle access and must be accessed by boat or kayak at high tide. It can accommodate up to 20 people and has very limited facilities, comprising a long-drop toilet and untreated water supply.

The Mita Bay campground is located in Mita Bay in the western section. It does not directly have vehicle access, but is accessible from the Sullivan's Bay carpark via a 1km 30–45 minute walk through native bush on the Mita Bay Loop Track. A shorter 800m 20–30 minutes access route is available two hours either side of low tide via the coast. It can accommodate up to 40 people and has treated potable drinking water, along with two long-drop toilets.

The Sullivan's Bay campground is located in Sullivan's Bay in the western section, with views overlooking Maunganui/Casnell Island. It is the only campground at Mahurangi with vehicle access, and is next to the Sullivan's Bay carpark. It is closed during winter (2 June to 17 October), can accommodate up to 30 people, and has treated potable drinking water along with two long-drop toilets.

=== Mahurangi Regatta ===
The Mahurangi Regatta occurs in the harbour on the weekend of Auckland Anniversary Day, and is centered on Sullivan's Bay. It is first recorded as having happened in 1858 and has been held annually since 1977 when it underwent a revival at Mahurangi Regional Park, which had not yet been formally opened to the public.

== Natural environment and ecology ==
The Mahurangi Harbour, which the park is located around the coast of, provides a habitat for the Little Blue Penguin, Pied Shag, Little Shag, Reef Heron, White Heron, Variable Oystercatcher, New Zealand Dotterel, and a range of other sea/shorebirds.

=== Mahurangi East ===
Auckland Council identifies the following indigenous ecosystems as being present within the eastern division of the park:

Name	Code	Threat status	Type	External link
Pōhutukawa, pūriri broadleaved forest	WF4	Endangered	Forest ecosystem	
Pōhutukawa treeland, flaxland and rockland	CL1	Vulnerable	Cliff ecosystem	
Kānuka scrub and forest	VS2	Least concern	Regenerating ecosystem	
Mangrove forest and scrub	SA1	Least concern	Coastal saline ecosystem	

=== Mahurangi West ===
Auckland Council identifies the following indigenous ecosystems as being present within the western division of the park:

Name	Code	Threat status	Type	External link
Pōhutukawa, pūriri broadleaved forest	WF4	Endangered	Forest ecosystem	
Kauri, podocarp broadleaved forest	WF11	Endangered	Forest ecosystem	
Pōhutukawa treeland, flaxland and rockland	CL1	Vulnerable	Cliff ecosystem	
Kānuka scrub and forest	VS2	Least concern	Regenerating ecosystem	
