= Casnell Island =

Island in Auckland Region, New Zealand

Native name: Maunganui
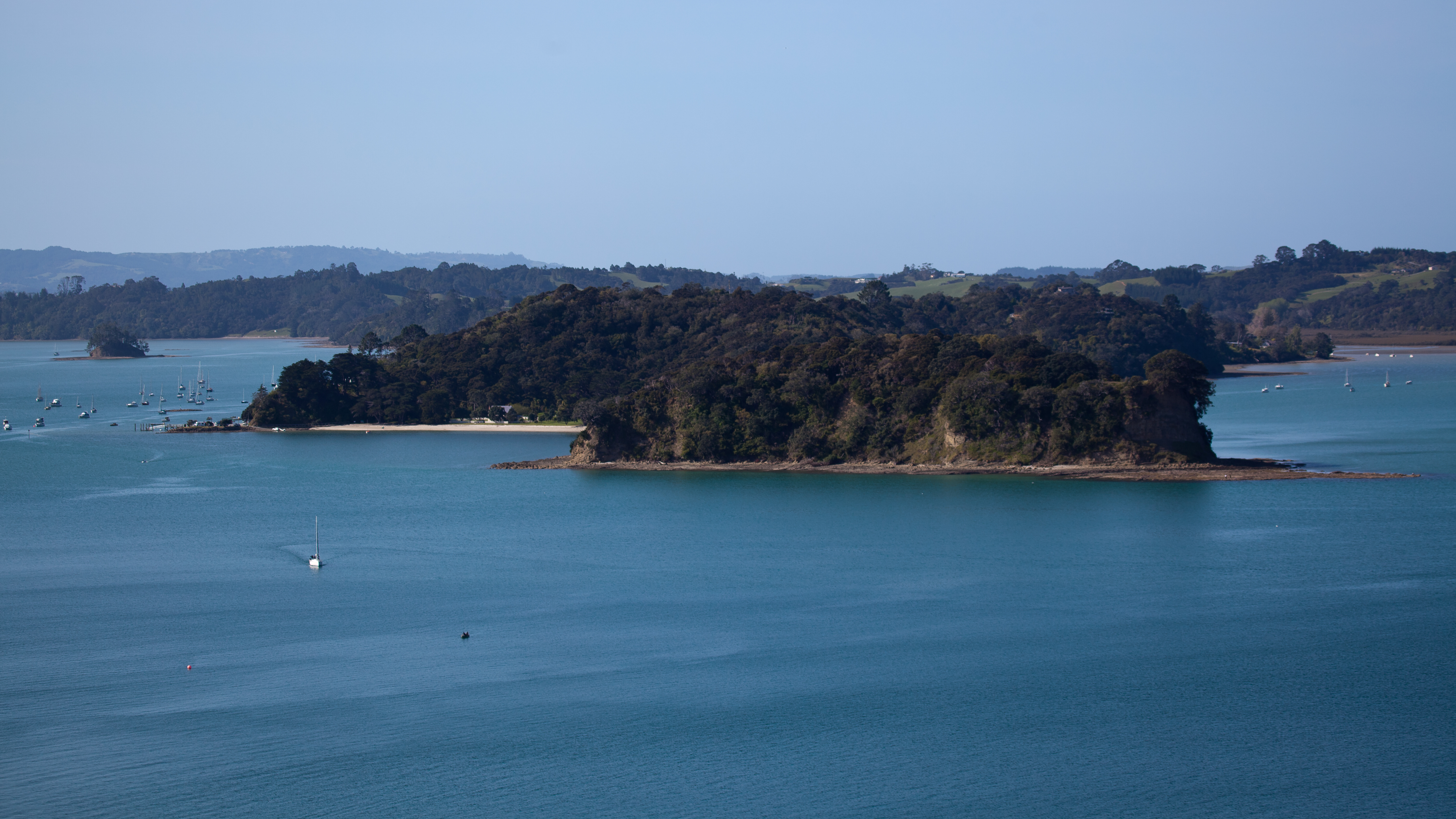
- Casnell Island in Mahurangi Harbour
- Interactive map of Casnell Island

Geography
- Location: Auckland
- Coordinates: 36°29′24″S 174°43′34″E
- Adjacent to: Mahurangi Harbour
- Area: 68,000 m^{2} (730,000 sq ft)
- Length: 386 m (1266 ft)
- Width: 230 m (750 ft)
- Highest elevation: 40 m (130 ft)

Administration
- New Zealand

Casnell Island is an uninhabited island located in the Mahurangi Harbour, Auckland Region, New Zealand. Casnell Island is managed by the Department of Conservation.

== Geography ==
The island is located in the Mahurangi Harbour at the mouth of Te Kapa River. It is accessible from Scotts Landing at low tide via a causeway. It is the largest island found in the Mahurangi Harbour.

The island is formed from Waitemata Group sandstone and mudstone.

== Biodiversity ==
Much of the island is dominated by kanuka forest, with areas of pōhutukawa, kōwhai and grassland.

== History ==
The island was a pā site in the 16th century, serving as a defensive fort at the entrance of the Mahurangi Harbour.
