= Mahurangi Harbour =

Harbour in Auckland Region, New Zealand

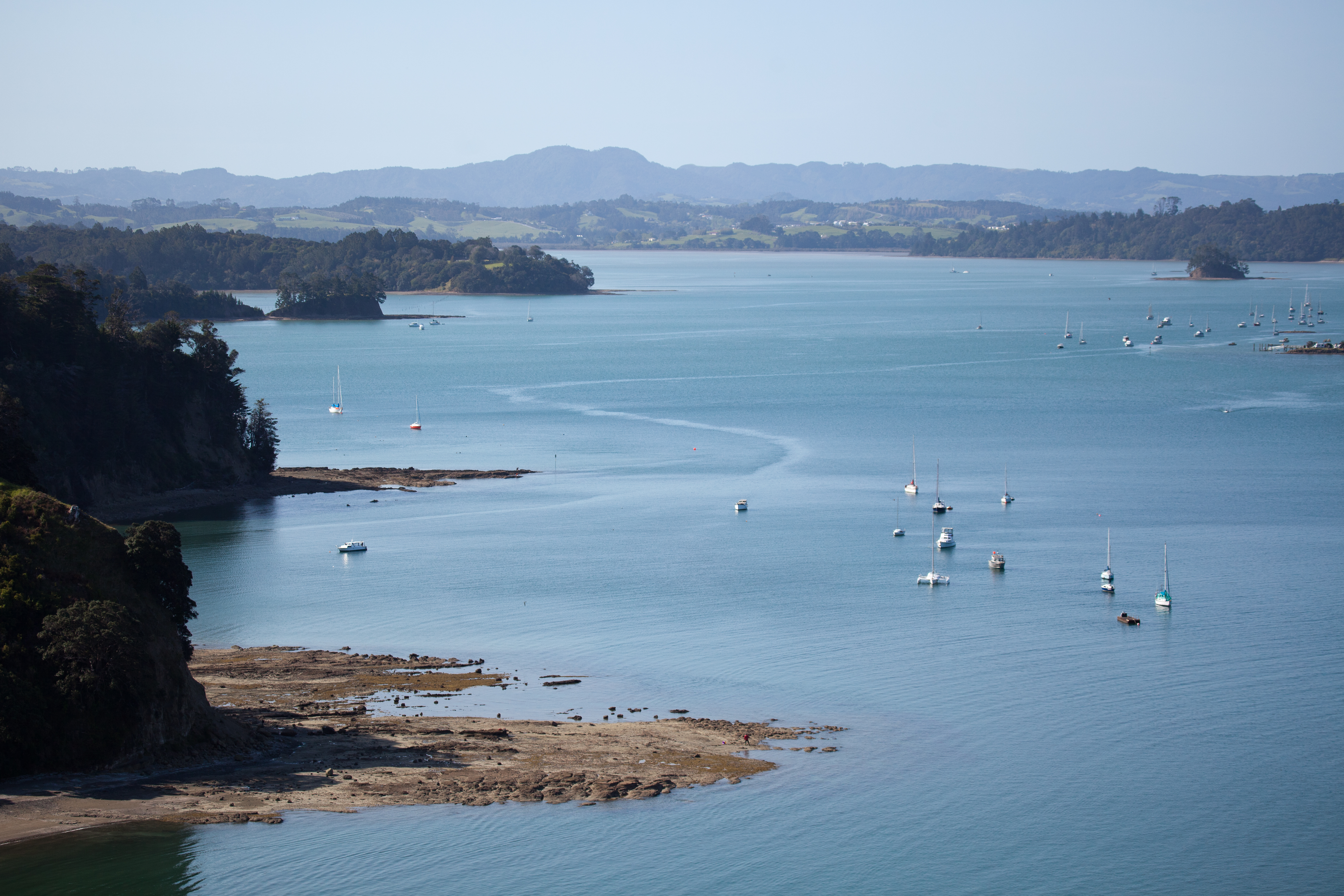

- Location within New Zealand
- Location: Auckland Region, New Zealand
- Coordinates: 36°27′45″S 174°43′21″E
- River sources: Mahurangi River, Te Kapa River, Duck Creek, Dyers Creek, Hepburn Creek
- Ocean/sea sources: Pacific Ocean
- Basin countries: New Zealand
- Islands: Casnell Island, Grants Island, Pudding Island
- Settlements: Mahurangi West, Pukapuka, Pohuehue, Snells Beach, Scotts Landing, Warkworth

Location and extent of Mahurangi Harbour

Mahurangi Harbour is a natural harbour in New Zealand. It is located on the north-eastern coast of the Auckland Region near the town of Warkworth, and empties into the Hauraki Gulf.

== Geography ==
The Mahurangi Harbour is a drowned river valley. Approximately 17,000 years ago during the Last Glacial Period when sea levels were significantly lower, the freshwater Mahurangi River flowed into the vast coastal plain that existed where the modern Hauraki Gulf exists. The river met the Waitematā Harbour (then a river) east of Kawau Island, and flowed north-east between modern day Little Barrier Island and Great Barrier Island, eventually emptying into the Pacific Ocean north of Great Barrier Island. The modern harbour formed approximately 7,200 years ago at the end of the last glacial maximum, when the forested valley was flooded by rising sea levels.

Land use within the harbour's catchment basin has been changing, and as of 2013 models predict an increase in sedimentation. A number of settlements are found along the shores of the harbour: Mahurangi West, Pukapuka, Pohuehue, Snells Beach and Scotts Landing. The major town of Warkworth is located along the Mahurangi River, a tidal estuary of the harbour. The Mahurangi Regional Park is located at the headlands on either side of the entrance to the harbour.

== History ==
The Mahurangi Harbour was settled by the Ngāti Rongo people of Ngāti Whātua/Te Kawerau descent, between the 17th and 20th centuries. Te Muri, to the south of the harbour's mouth, was a major settlement of Ngāti Rongo until the death of rangatira Te Hemara Tauhia in 1891. Sea captain John Sullivan moved to the area in the 1870s, settling at Otarawao and marrying Merehai Kaipuke, a Ngāti Rongo woman of high birth. Their family farmed the area for over a century. After being extensively hunted in the 19th century, southern right whales have returned and can again sometimes be seen in Mahurangi Harbour.
