= Pōhuehue =

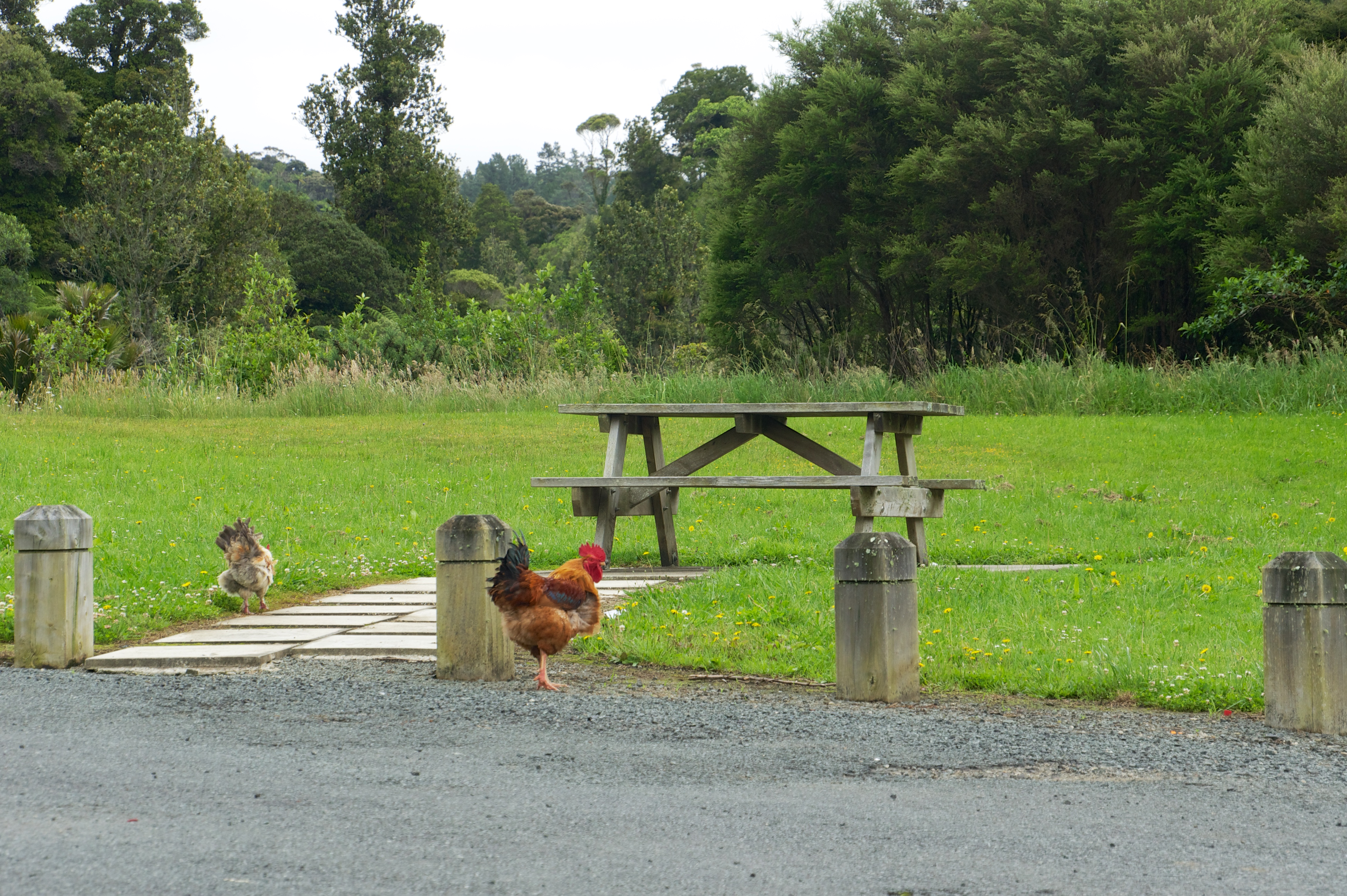
- Picnic area at the start of the Moirs Hill Walkway in Pōhuehue
- Interactive map of Pōhuehue
- Coordinates: 36.464°S 174.653°E
- Country: New Zealand
- Region: Auckland Region
- Ward: Rodney ward
- Community board: Rodney Local Board
- Subdivision: Warkworth subdivision
- Electorates: Kaipara ki Mahurangi; Te Tai Tokerau

Government
  - Territorial Authority: Auckland Council

Pōhuehue is a rural locality in Rodney, in the Auckland Region of New Zealand. It is located on State Highway 1 between Puhoi and Warkworth.

== Geography ==
Pōhuehue is found at the intersection between State Highway 1 and Cowan Bay Road in Rodney. The Pōhuehue Viaduct is a bridge along State Highway 1 in the area.

== History ==
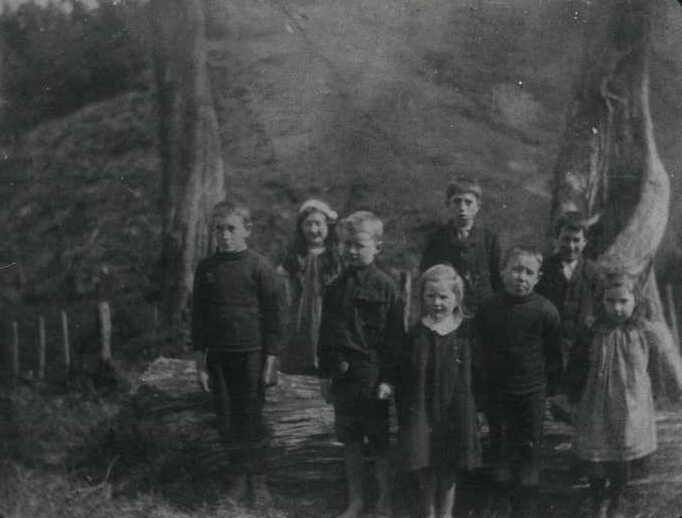
Children of the Perry, Barker, Wach, and Russell families who attended Huhue School in the early 1910s

European settlers came to the area in the 1860s, calling the area Little Scotland, or Huhue. The first families in the area were the Wilson, Shaw and Perry families. Shaw family began farming in the area in 1864, and soon after constructed a historic farmhouse. The Perry family developed an orchard and nursery in Pōhuehue.

In 1899, the Huhue School was opened, only available for three days every week as the sole teacher split his time between the school and Mahurangi West. The Pōhuehue post office was opened in 1912, and in 1916 the school was renamed Pohuehue School. In 1928, work began on the Pohuehue Viaduct, to bypass a steep gully and better align State Highway 1. The new road was built overtop of the old school playground.

== Attractions ==
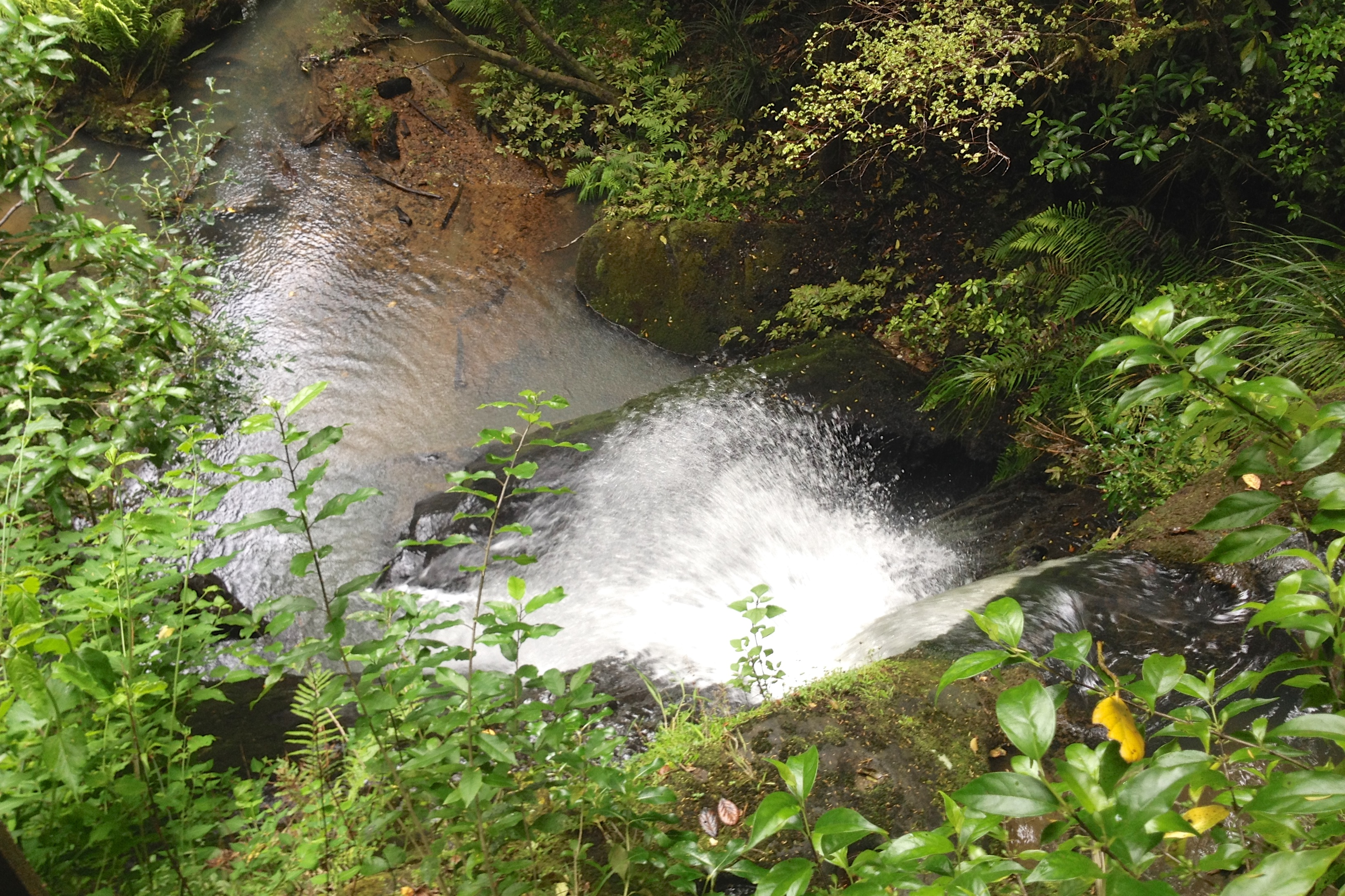
The Pōhuehue Waterfall

Moirs Hill Walkway is located in Pōhuehue, in the Pohuehue Scenic Reserve. The Pohuehue Scenic Reserve is primarily forested with kohekohe and taraire, and native greenhood orchid species can often be found in spring. A small waterfall, the Pohuehue Falls, is located along the walkway.

The Redwoods Treehouse, a 14-metre tall pod structure wrapped around a redwood tree designed by Peter Eising, was constructed in Pōhuehue in 2008. Originally commissioned for a marketing campaign for the Yellow Pages, the structure became a restaurant and an event venue.
