= Scotts Landing =

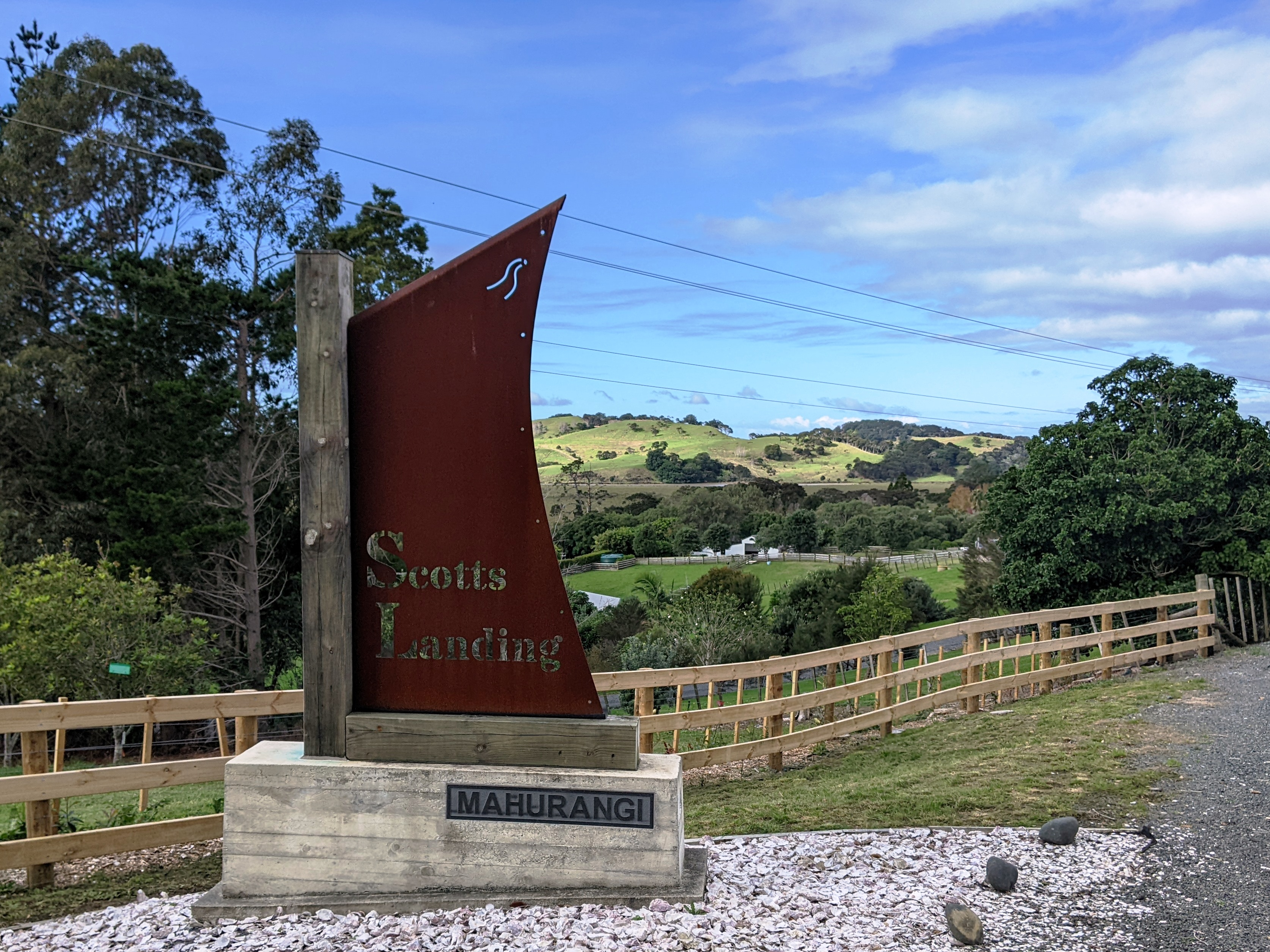
- Scotts Landing sign
- Interactive map of Scotts Landing
- Coordinates: 36.485°S 174.725°E
- Country: New Zealand
- Region: Auckland Region
- Ward: Rodney ward
- Local board: Rodney Local Board
- Subdivision: Warkworth subdivision
- Electorates: Kaipara ki Mahurangi; Te Tai Tokerau

Government
  - Territorial Authority: Auckland Council
  - Mayor of Auckland: Wayne Brown
  - Kaipara ki Mahurangi MP: Chris Penk
  - Te Tai Tokerau MP: Mariameno Kapa-Kingi

Area
  - Total: 2.56 km^{2} (0.99 sq mi)

Population (June 2025)
  - Total: 210
  - Density: 82/km^{2} (210/sq mi)

Scotts Landing, also called Mahurangi East, is a rural settlement in the Auckland Region of New Zealand. It is at the end of a narrow peninsula on the eastern side of Mahurangi Harbour. Algies Bay is to the north.

== History ==
Casnell Island (Motu Maunganui), accessible from Scotts Landing at low tide via a causeway, was a pā site in the 16th century.

In 1852, the Scott homestead was constructed, later burning down in a fire. This was replaced by a new Georgian-style house, built in 1877.

Mahurangi Heads School operated from 1869. It closed in the 1920s or 1930s, but the school building was still standing about 1941.

== Governance ==
The Eastern Mahurangi Road Board governed the area from 24 July 1868 to 1923.

== Demographics ==
Statistics New Zealand describes Scotts Landing-Mahurangi East as a rural settlement, which covers 2.56 km^{2} (0.99 sq mi) and had an estimated population of 210 as of June 2025, with a population density of 82 people per km^{2}. Scotts Landing-Mahurangi East is part of the larger Mahurangi Peninsula statistical area.

Historical population
Year	Pop.	±% p.a.
2006	165	—
2013	192	+2.19%
2018	177	−1.61%
2023	207	+3.18%

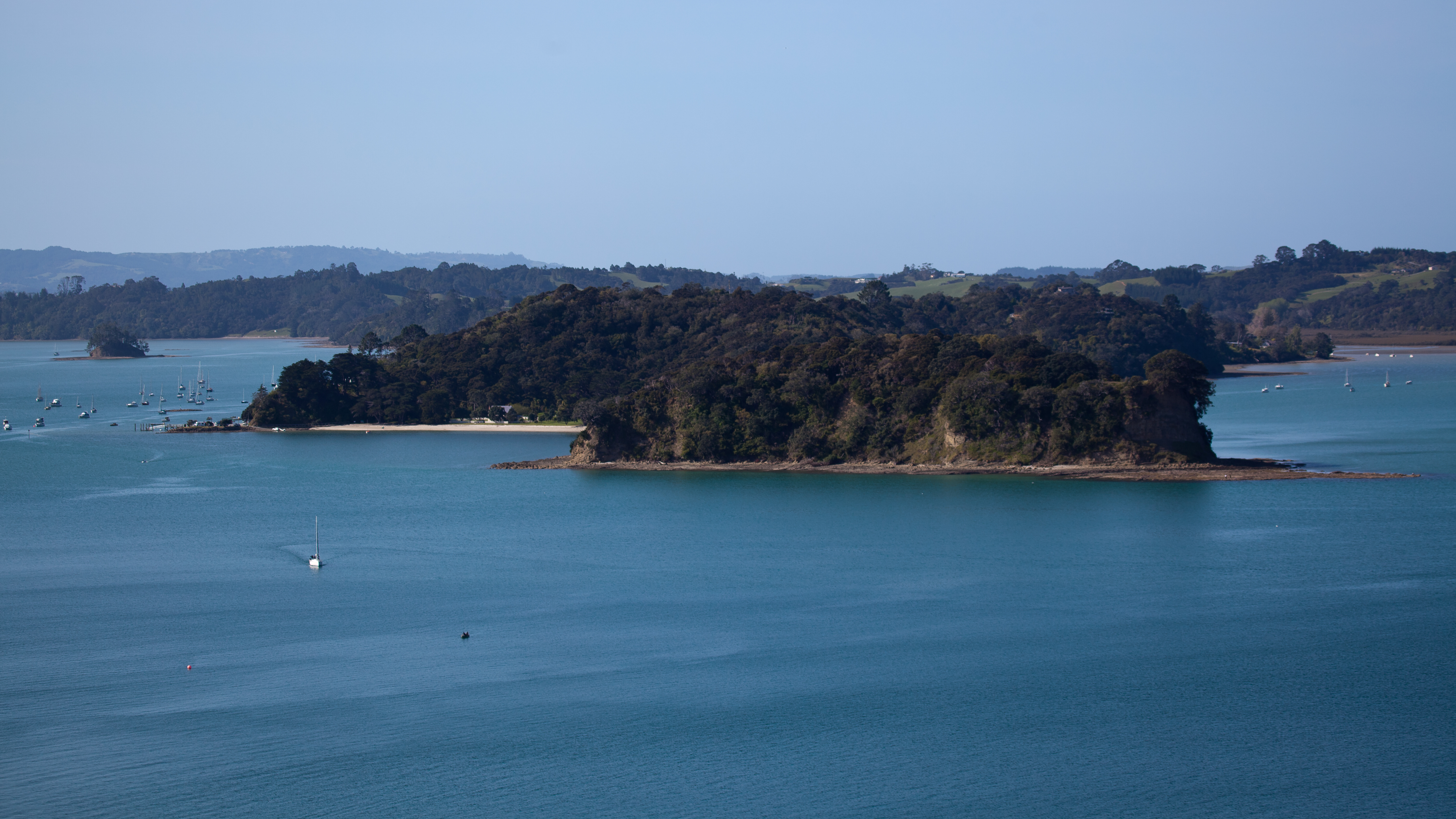
Casnell Island, with Scotts Landing visible behind it on the left

Scotts Landing-Mahurangi East had a population of 207 in the 2023 New Zealand census, an increase of 30 people (16.9%) since the 2018 census, and an increase of 15 people (7.8%) since the 2013 census. There were 102 males, 102 females and 3 people of other genders in 87 dwellings. 2.9% of people identified as LGBTIQ+. The median age was 63.1 years (compared with 38.1 years nationally). There were 24 people (11.6%) aged under 15 years, 12 (5.8%) aged 15 to 29, 87 (42.0%) aged 30 to 64, and 81 (39.1%) aged 65 or older.

People could identify as more than one ethnicity. The results were 98.6% European (Pākehā), 8.7% Māori, 1.4% Pasifika, and 1.4% Asian. English was spoken by 100.0%, Māori language by 1.4%, and other languages by 7.2%. The percentage of people born overseas was 26.1, compared with 28.8% nationally.

Religious affiliations were 27.5% Christian, 1.4% Buddhist, 1.4% New Age, and 1.4% other religions. People who answered that they had no religion were 60.9%, and 8.7% of people did not answer the census question.

Of those at least 15 years old, 54 (29.5%) people had a bachelor's or higher degree, 87 (47.5%) had a post-high school certificate or diploma, and 18 (9.8%) people exclusively held high school qualifications. The median income was $45,300, compared with $41,500 nationally. 30 people (16.4%) earned over $100,000 compared to 12.1% nationally. The employment status of those at least 15 was that 54 (29.5%) people were employed full-time and 42 (23.0%) were part-time.

== Amenities ==
Mahurangi Regional Park at Scott Point

Burton Wells Scenic Reserve is a park named after a local surveyor.
