= Algies Bay =

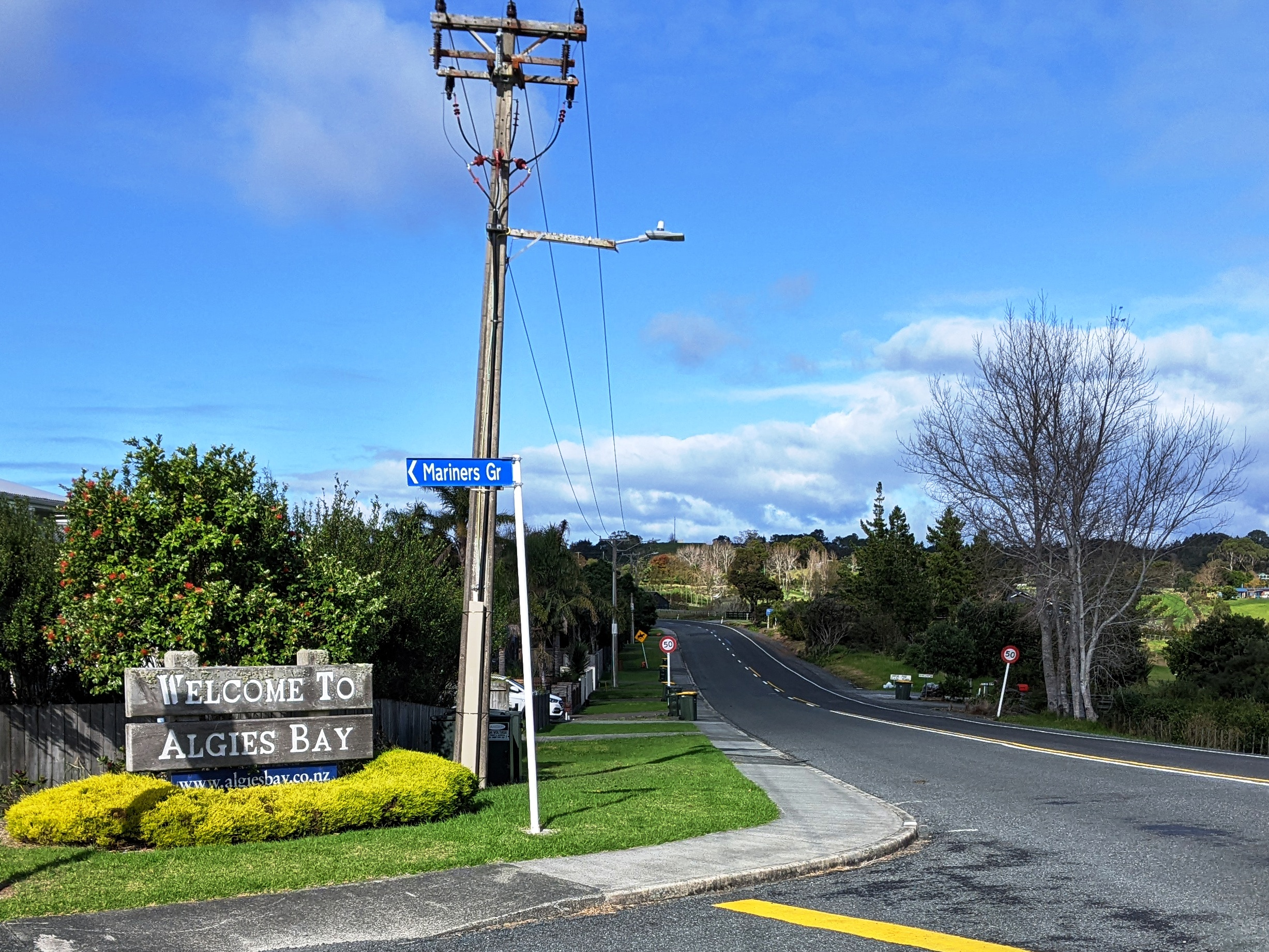
- Welcome sign
- Interactive map of Algies Bay
- Coordinates: 36.432°S 174.738°E
- Country: New Zealand
- Region: Auckland Region
- Ward: Rodney ward
- Local board: Rodney Local Board
- Subdivision: Warkworth subdivision
- Electorates: Kaipara ki Mahurangi; Te Tai Tokerau

Government
  - Territorial Authority: Auckland Council
  - Mayor of Auckland: Wayne Brown
  - Kaipara ki Mahurangi MP: Chris Penk
  - Te Tai Tokerau MP: Mariameno Kapa-Kingi

Area
  - Total: 0.67 km^{2} (0.26 sq mi)

Population (June 2025)
  - Total: 720
  - Density: 1,100/km^{2} (2,800/sq mi)
- Postcode(s): 0982

Snells Beach	(Kawau Bay)	(Kawau Bay)
(Mahurangi Inlet)	Algies Bay	(Kawau Bay)
(Mahurangi Inlet)	Scotts Landing	Martins Bay

Algies Bay is a northern coastal suburb of Auckland, in New Zealand. It is on the Mahurangi Peninsula about 68 kilometres (by road) north of the city centre.

Highfield Garden Reserve is a 10 acre reserve of public land along Mahurangi East Road. Until 1985, it was a privately owned flower-growing and orchard business, which also had donkeys. Alison and Ted Roberts donated the land to the Crown, and it now has gardens, walks, fruit trees, and donkeys. The Roberts' donkeys were allowed to stay at the park after they donated the land.

Scandrett Regional Park and Mahurangi Regional Park East are south of Algies Bay.

== Demographics ==
Statistics New Zealand describes Algies Bay as a rural settlement, which covers 0.67 km^{2} (0.26 sq mi) and had an estimated population of 720 as of June 2025, with a population density of 1,075 people per km^{2}. Algies Bay is part of the larger Mahurangi Peninsula statistical area.

Historical population for Algies Bay
Year	Pop.	±% p.a.
2006	612	—
2013	648	+0.82%
2018	759	+3.21%
2023	726	−0.89%

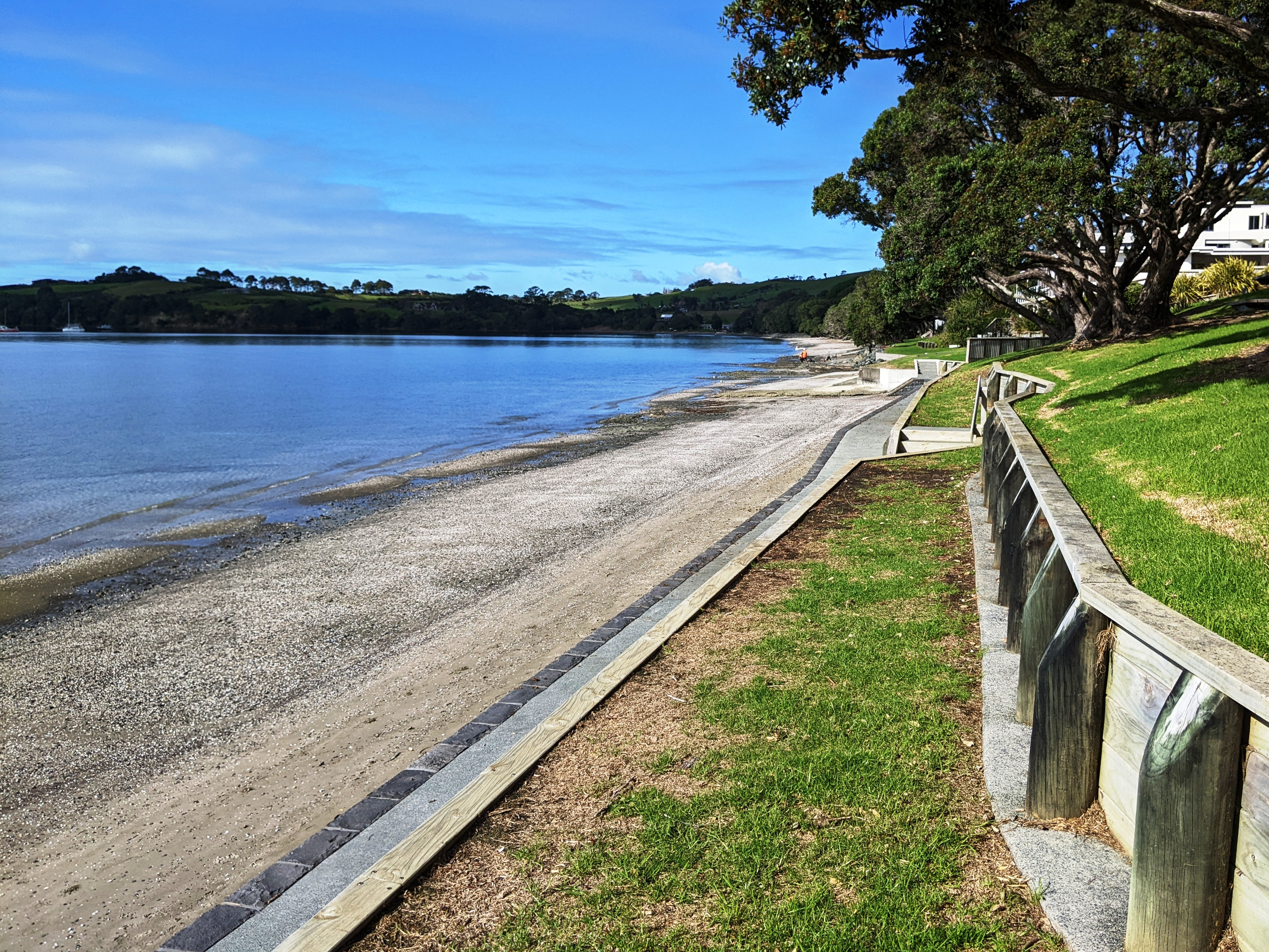
Beach at Algies Bay, looking southeast

Algies Bay had a population of 726 in the 2023 New Zealand census, a decrease of 33 people (−4.3%) since the 2018 census, and an increase of 78 people (12.0%) since the 2013 census. There were 348 males, 375 females and 3 people of other genders in 300 dwellings. 2.5% of people identified as LGBTIQ+. The median age was 62.8 years (compared with 38.1 years nationally). There were 78 people (10.7%) aged under 15 years, 66 (9.1%) aged 15 to 29, 246 (33.9%) aged 30 to 64, and 333 (45.9%) aged 65 or older.

People could identify as more than one ethnicity. The results were 90.9% European (Pākehā); 7.0% Māori; 2.9% Pasifika; 6.2% Asian; 1.2% Middle Eastern, Latin American and African New Zealanders (MELAA); and 2.5% other, which includes people giving their ethnicity as "New Zealander". English was spoken by 98.3%, Māori language by 1.2%, Samoan by 0.4%, and other languages by 10.3%. No language could be spoken by 0.8% (e.g. too young to talk). The percentage of people born overseas was 26.9, compared with 28.8% nationally.

Religious affiliations were 46.3% Christian, 1.2% Hindu, 0.4% Buddhist, 0.4% New Age, and 0.8% other religions. People who answered that they had no religion were 45.9%, and 5.0% of people did not answer the census question.

Of those at least 15 years old, 111 (17.1%) people had a bachelor's or higher degree, 330 (50.9%) had a post-high school certificate or diploma, and 171 (26.4%) people exclusively held high school qualifications. The median income was $32,000, compared with $41,500 nationally. 48 people (7.4%) earned over $100,000 compared to 12.1% nationally. The employment status of those at least 15 was that 189 (29.2%) people were employed full-time, 96 (14.8%) were part-time, and 6 (0.9%) were unemployed.

=== Mahurangi Peninsula statistical area ===
Mahurangi Peninsula statistical area, which was called Algies Bay-Scotts Landing before the 2023 census, covers 15.35 km^{2} (5.93 sq mi) and had an estimated population of 1,260 as of June 2025, with a population density of 82 people per km^{2}.

Historical population for the statistical area
Year	Pop.	±% p.a.
2006	933	—
2013	1,041	+1.58%
2018	1,185	+2.63%
2023	1,221	+0.60%

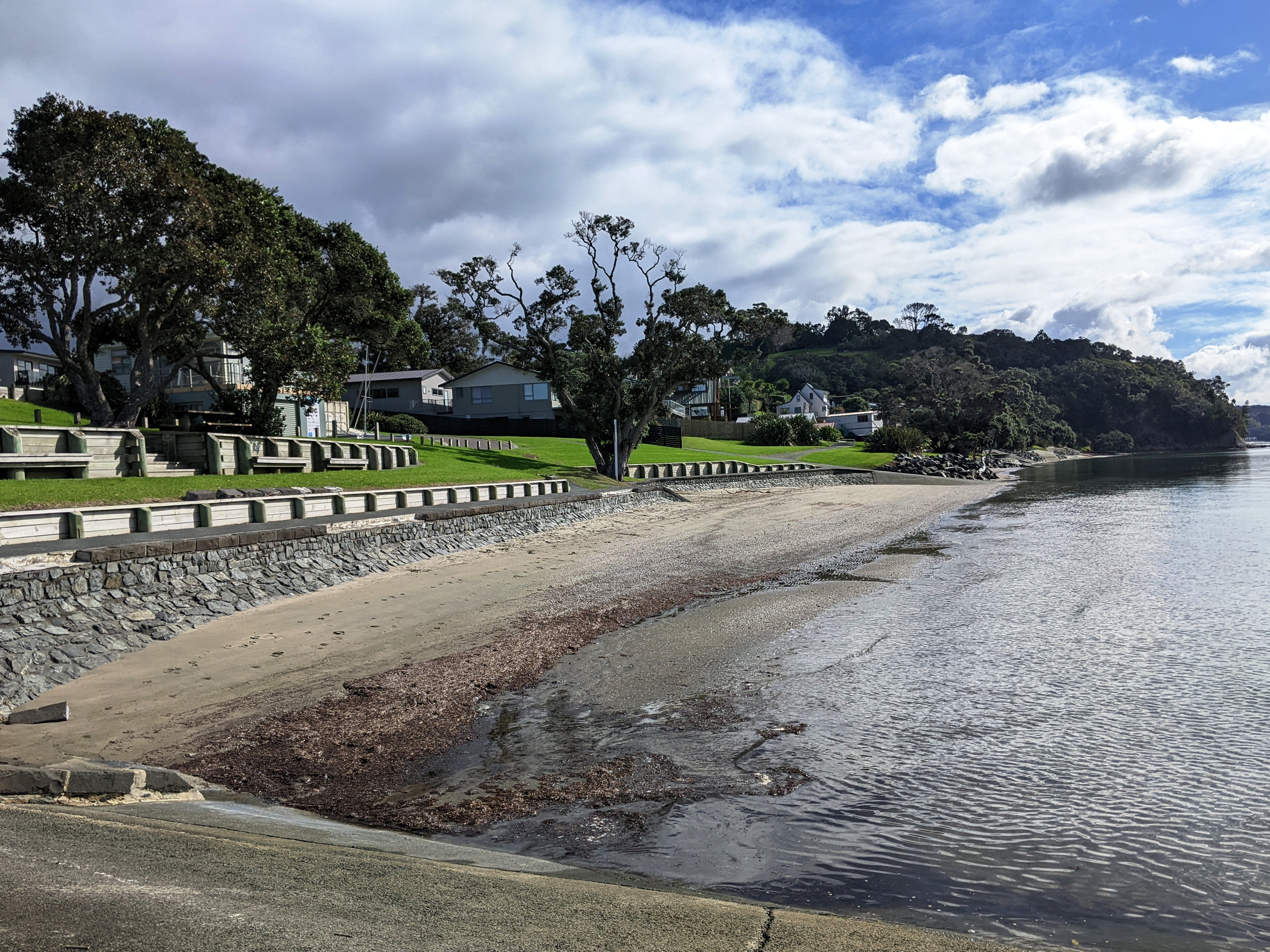
Beach at Algies Bay, looking northwest

Mahurangi Peninsula had a population of 1,221 in the 2023 New Zealand census, an increase of 36 people (3.0%) since the 2018 census, and an increase of 180 people (17.3%) since the 2013 census. There were 588 males, 624 females and 6 people of other genders in 501 dwellings. 2.5% of people identified as LGBTIQ+. The median age was 61.5 years (compared with 38.1 years nationally). There were 141 people (11.5%) aged under 15 years, 111 (9.1%) aged 15 to 29, 459 (37.6%) aged 30 to 64, and 507 (41.5%) aged 65 or older.

People could identify as more than one ethnicity. The results were 92.6% European (Pākehā); 8.4% Māori; 2.7% Pasifika; 4.2% Asian; 0.7% Middle Eastern, Latin American and African New Zealanders (MELAA); and 3.4% other, which includes people giving their ethnicity as "New Zealander". English was spoken by 98.8%, Māori language by 1.2%, Samoan by 0.2%, and other languages by 8.6%. No language could be spoken by 0.5% (e.g. too young to talk). The percentage of people born overseas was 24.1, compared with 28.8% nationally.

Religious affiliations were 39.8% Christian, 0.7% Hindu, 0.7% Buddhist, 0.5% New Age, and 1.2% other religions. People who answered that they had no religion were 50.9%, and 5.9% of people did not answer the census question.

Of those at least 15 years old, 219 (20.3%) people had a bachelor's or higher degree, 561 (51.9%) had a post-high school certificate or diploma, and 231 (21.4%) people exclusively held high school qualifications. The median income was $34,800, compared with $41,500 nationally. 111 people (10.3%) earned over $100,000 compared to 12.1% nationally. The employment status of those at least 15 was that 333 (30.8%) people were employed full-time, 189 (17.5%) were part-time, and 9 (0.8%) were unemployed.
