= Snells Beach =

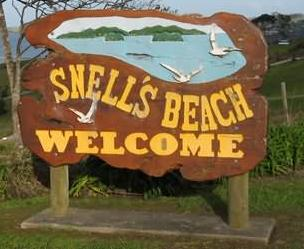
- Interactive map of Snells Beach
- Coordinates: 36°25′20″S 174°43′39″E
- Country: New Zealand
- Region: Auckland Region
- Ward: Rodney ward
- Local board: Rodney Local Board
- Subdivision: Warkworth subdivision
- Electorates: Kaipara ki Mahurangi; Te Tai Tokerau

Government
  - Territorial Authority: Auckland Council
  - Mayor of Auckland: Wayne Brown
  - Kaipara ki Mahurangi MP: Jessica Rowe
  - Te Tai Tokerau MP: TBD

Area
  - Total: 3.83 km^{2} (1.48 sq mi)

Population (June 2025)
  - Total: 3,750
  - Density: 979/km^{2} (2,540/sq mi)
- Postcode(s): 0982

Snells Beach is a small coastal town in the north of Auckland Region in the North Island of New Zealand. It is situated on the eastern coast of the Mahurangi Peninsula and its namesake beach faces east across Kawau Bay to Kawau Island. The nearest town is Warkworth, 8 km (5.0 mi) to the west, which is linked by 8 buses a day and also Mahu City Express twice a day.

== Geography ==
Snells Beach is an isthmus located on the Mahurangi Peninsula, between the Mahurangi Harbour and Kawau Bay of the Hauraki Gulf. It is located 8 kilometres (5.0 mi) east of the town of Warkworth, and adjacent to the settlements of Sandspit and Algies Bay.

Important seagrass meadows are present on the shallow tidal ecosystem at Snells Beach. The seagrass protects Snells Beach from intense wave action and is an important source of food for protected native wildlife that lives and visits the shoreline.

== History ==
=== Māori history ===
The wider Mahurangi area has been settled since at least the 13th century. One of the first known iwi to have settled in the area is Ngāi Tāhuhu. Te Arawa and Tainui migratory waka are known to have visited the area, and descendants of captain Manaia of the Māhuhu-ki-te-rangi waka are known to have intermarried with Ngāi Tāhuhu.

Mahurangi peoples primarily focused settlement along the shores of the Hauraki Gulf, moving between different kāinga based on available seasonal resources. Snells Beach and adjacent Algies Bay (Horahorawai) were protected by headland pā to the north and south, which looked out towards Kawau Island and Moanauriuri (Kawau Bay), an important shark fishery. Archaeological middens and terraces have been discovered in the areas adjacent to the north and south headlands of Snells Beach.

By the mid-1700s, Marutūāhu tribes from the Hauraki Gulf, especially Ngāti Pāoa, sought to control the shark fishery located on the Mahurangi coast, between Kawau Island and the Whangaparāoa Peninsula. War broke out between Ngāti Pāoa and the Kawerau hapū. By the early 19th century, Kawerau-descended hapū held exclusive land rights to the Mahurangi, while fishing rights were shared between these hapū and the Marutūāhu tribes. By the early 19th Century, the Mahurangi Harbour was primarily settled by Ngāti Rongo and their related hapū Ngāti Kā and Ngāti Raupō, all of whom kept close ties to Ngāti Manuhiri, while Marutūahu tribes frequented the coast during the summertime.

In the early 1820s during the Musket Wars, Ngāpuhi and related northern tribes attacked the Mahurangi area settlements in retaliation for past losses, leading to the Mahurangi area being depopulated. Ngāti Rongo, Ngāti Raupō and Ngāti Mahuhiri sought refuge with different tribes in Northland. Ngāti Rongo returned to the Mahurangi area in 1836, under the leadership of Te Hēmara Tauhia, focusing settlement at Te Muri. Ngāti Rongo, Ngāti Raupō and Ngāti Mahuhiri returned to the area by the late 1830s or early 1840s. By this period, many of the Kawerau hapū had developed associations with Ngāti Whātua, and the Mahurangi area was contested between Kawerau, Ngāti Whātua and Marutūāhu tribes.

=== European settlement ===
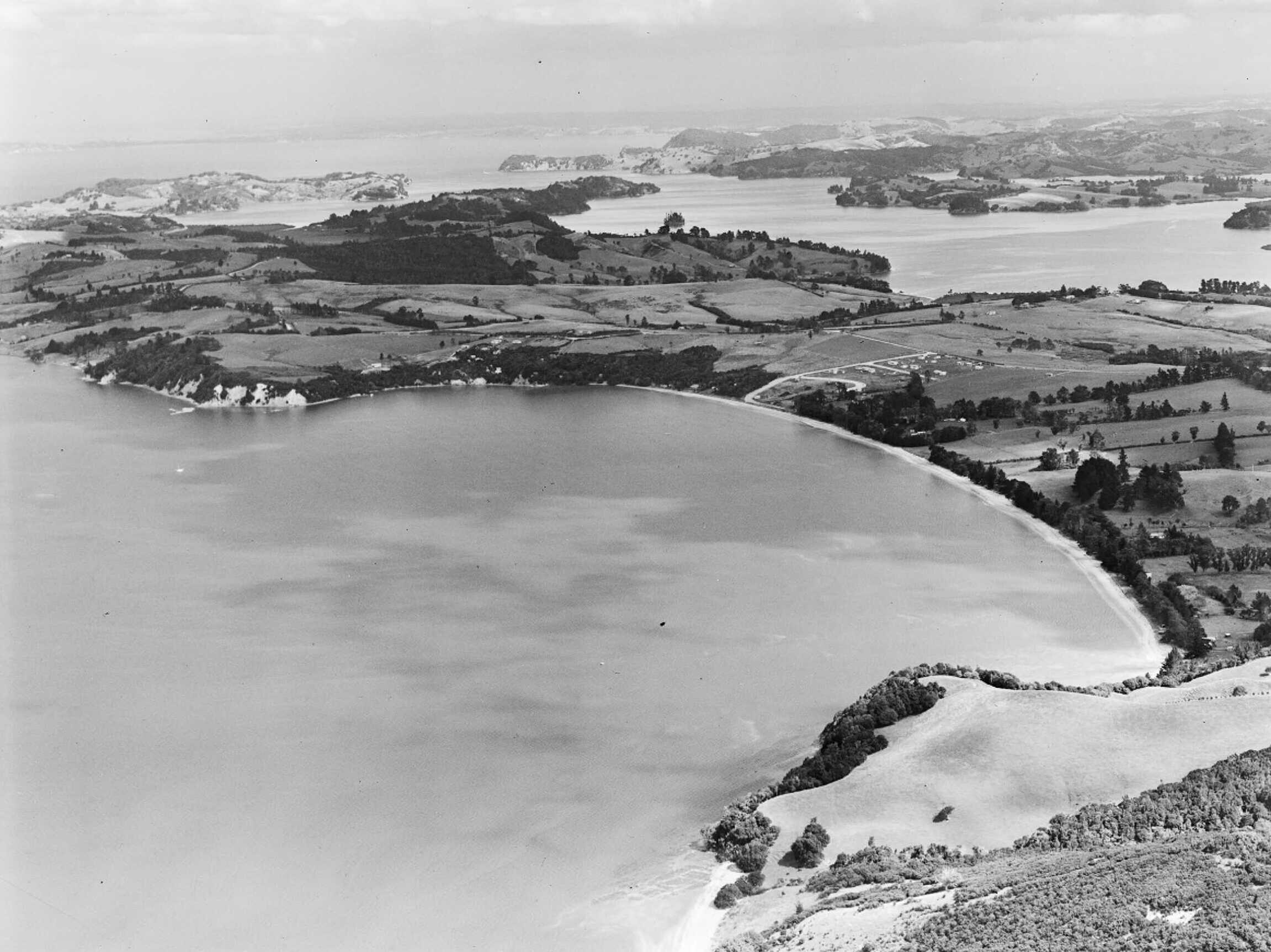
Aerial view of Snells Beach in 1957

Following the signing of the Treaty of Waitangi in 1840, the Crown made the first purchases of the Mahurangi and Omaha blocks on 13 April 1841. While some iwi and hapū with customary interests had been engaged, such as Ngāti Paoa; Ngāti Rongo, Ngāti Raupō and Ngāti Manuhiri were not a part of this transaction, and it took the Crown until the 1850s to finalise a deal these tribes.

The area was originally known as Long Beach to early European settlers. It was bought in 1854 by Cornish miner James Snell, who had initially settled at Kawau Island after first working at mines in South Australia. Snell settled at the beach, where his family farmed for generations. Scottish immigrant Alexander Algie and wife Mina, née Deerness, bought the land to the south at Martins Bay, where his brother Samuel settled in 1867. The Algie family established a boarding house on the beach in the late 1890s, which operated until 1941.

In 1904, J. Clayden and J. Parkinson discovered a large amount of kauri gum at Snells Beach, extracting seven tons during low tide. Further digs took place in 1907, predominantly by recent Dalmatian immigrants to the area. By the early 20th century, Snells Beach was becoming a popular spot for holidaymakers, and in the 1930s, the area became better connected to the Auckland roading network, when a metal road was constructed along the Mahurangi Peninsula.

The first block of shops in Snells Beach was constructed in 1982. The commercial and light industrial area of Snells Beach led to the community becoming the service centre for the wider Mahurangi Peninsula, and the second largest commercial centre in the Warkworth/Matakana areas. During the 2010s, the area transitioned away from being primarily a holiday town to a permanently settled satellite town of Warkworth. In 2012, the Snells Beach library was marked for closure, leaving many residents bewildered and angry.

== Demographics ==
Statistics New Zealand describes Snells Beach as a small urban area, which covers 3.83 km^{2} (1.48 sq mi) and had an estimated population of 3,750 as of June 2025, with a population density of 979 people per km^{2}.

Historical population
Year	Pop.	±% p.a.
2006	2,727	—
2013	2,931	+1.04%
2018	3,405	+3.04%
2023	3,678	+1.55%

Snells Beach had a population of 3,678 in the 2023 New Zealand census, an increase of 273 people (8.0%) since the 2018 census, and an increase of 747 people (25.5%) since the 2013 census. There were 1,824 males, 1,845 females and 12 people of other genders in 1,452 dwellings. 1.9% of people identified as LGBTIQ+. The median age was 48.1 years (compared with 38.1 years nationally). There were 654 people (17.8%) aged under 15 years, 429 (11.7%) aged 15 to 29, 1,521 (41.4%) aged 30 to 64, and 1,074 (29.2%) aged 65 or older.

People could identify as more than one ethnicity. The results were 90.0% European (Pākehā); 10.8% Māori; 5.2% Pasifika; 4.5% Asian; 1.2% Middle Eastern, Latin American and African New Zealanders (MELAA); and 1.5% other, which includes people giving their ethnicity as "New Zealander". English was spoken by 98.0%, Māori language by 1.2%, Samoan by 0.2%, and other languages by 9.9%. No language could be spoken by 1.5% (e.g. too young to talk). New Zealand Sign Language was known by 0.4%. The percentage of people born overseas was 27.7, compared with 28.8% nationally.

Religious affiliations were 34.2% Christian, 0.3% Hindu, 0.3% Islam, 0.2% Māori religious beliefs, 0.5% Buddhist, 0.6% New Age, 0.2% Jewish, and 1.1% other religions. People who answered that they had no religion were 54.2%, and 8.6% of people did not answer the census question.

Of those at least 15 years old, 477 (15.8%) people had a bachelor's or higher degree, 1,605 (53.1%) had a post-high school certificate or diploma, and 792 (26.2%) people exclusively held high school qualifications. The median income was $34,200, compared with $41,500 nationally. 297 people (9.8%) earned over $100,000 compared to 12.1% nationally. The employment status of those at least 15 was that 1,233 (40.8%) people were employed full-time, 483 (16.0%) were part-time, and 51 (1.7%) were unemployed.

== Features and attractions ==
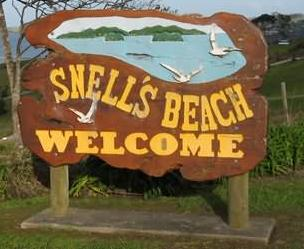
Welcome to Snells Beach

The 2.5 kilometre long tidal sandy beach, which attracts a variety of shorebirds, is popular for kite surfing, paddle boarding, swimming, fishing, and dog walking. The pohutukawa-lined esplanade reserve features footpaths, playgrounds, picnic areas, a public barbecue, a waterfront café, public toilets, showers, boat ramps, and free overnight parking for motorhomes.

The Mahurangi Shopping Centre includes cafés, retail stores, public toilets, Wifi facilities, and overnight parking for motorhomes. The adjacent Goodalls Reserve hosts a community centre, library, bowling club, tennis club, kindergarten, skate park, sports fields, dog exercise area, and walking tracks. Nearby is a petrol station, two motels, and several bed and breakfasts.

The Brick Bay Sculpture Trail – an outdoor gallery showcasing contemporary sculpture amongst native trees, palms, birdlife and green pastures – is located at the western entrance of Snells Beach. Snells Beach contains the Rodney District’s regional television broadcaster: Family TV.

== Education ==
Snells Beach Primary is a coeducational contributing primary school catering for years 1-6. It opened in 2009. The school is intended to grow to about 500 students. The roll was 348 students in July 2026. Horizon School, formerly Mahurangi Christian School, is a coeducational full primary (years 1-8) school with a roll of 206 students as at July 2026.. The school is state integrated.
