= Te Kapa River =

River in the Auckland Region, New Zealand

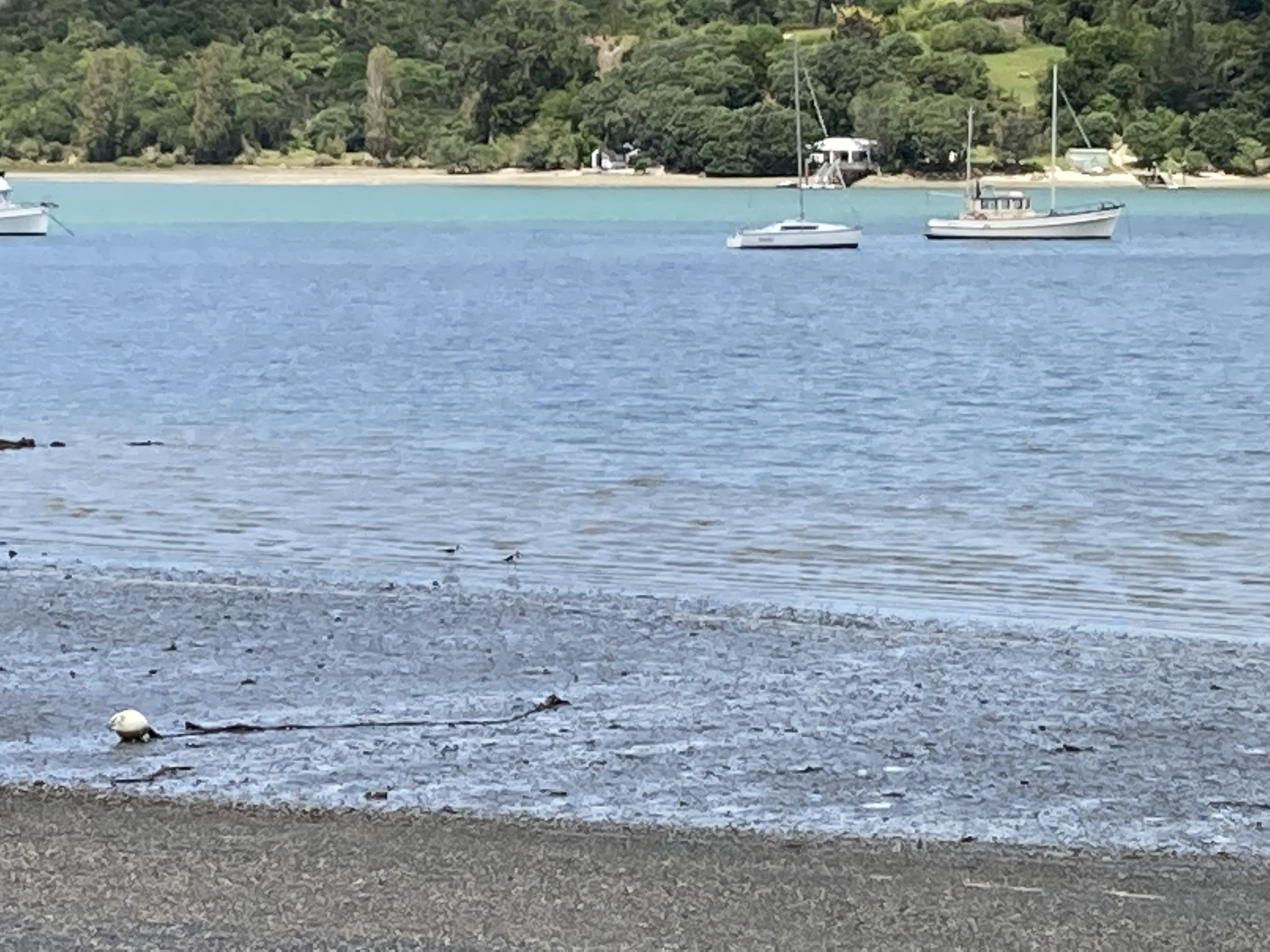

- Mouth of Te Kapa River Te Kapa River (New Zealand)
- Route of Te Kapa River

Location
- Country: New Zealand
- Region: Auckland Region
- Ward: Rodney

Physical characteristics
- Source: Mahurangi Peninsula
  - coordinates: 36.44583°S 174.75628°E
- Mouth: Mahurangi Harbour
  - coordinates: 36.4907°S 174.7308°E

Basin features
- Progression: Te Kapa River → Mahurangi Harbour → Hauraki Gulf

The Te Kapa River is on the Mahurangi Peninsula in the Auckland Region of New Zealand's North Island. It runs into the Mahurangi Harbour.

== See also ==
- List of rivers of New Zealand
