= Mahurangi West =

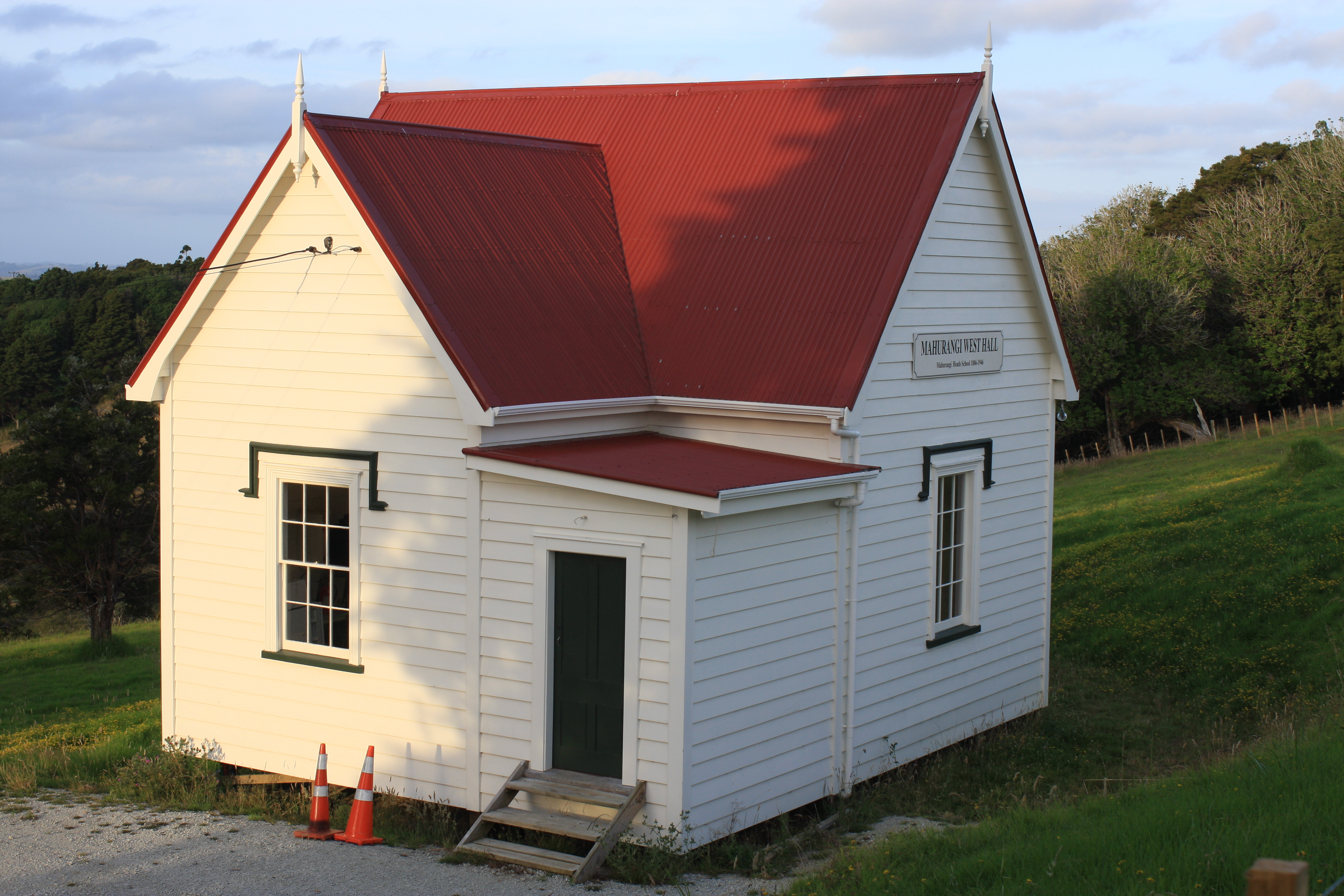
- Mahurangi West Hall, originally Mahurangi Heads West School
- Interactive map of Mahurangi West
- Coordinates: 36.503°S 174.694°E
- Country: New Zealand
- Region: Auckland Region
- Ward: Rodney ward
- Community board: Rodney Local Board
- Subdivision: Warkworth subdivision
- Electorates: Kaipara ki Mahurangi; Te Tai Tokerau

Government
  - Territorial Authority: Auckland Council
  - Mayor of Auckland: Wayne Brown
  - Kaipara ki Mahurangi MP: Chris Penk
  - Te Tai Tokerau MP: Mariameno Kapa-Kingi

Area
  - Total: 0.37 km^{2} (0.14 sq mi)

Population (June 2025)
  - Total: 120
  - Density: 320/km^{2} (840/sq mi)

Mahurangi West is a rural settlement in the Auckland Region of New Zealand. Puhoi is to the west, Mahurangi Harbour is to the east, and the western part of Mahurangi Regional Park is southeast.

Mahurangi Heads West School operated from 1886 to 1946. It was a half-time school for the early part of this period, sharing its teacher with another school. The school building is now Mahurangi West Hall.

Albert Dennis Reserve is a park in Mahurangi West that was established following a bequeathment of land from Emilie Alexis Dennis in her will.

== Demographics ==
Statistics New Zealand describes Mahurangi West as a rural settlement, which covers 0.37 km^{2} (0.14 sq mi) and had an estimated population of 120 as of June 2025, with a population density of 324 people per km^{2}. Mahurangi West is part of the larger Puhoi Valley statistical area.

Historical population
Year	Pop.	±% p.a.
2006	75	—
2013	90	+2.64%
2018	129	+7.47%
2023	117	−1.93%
The 2006 population is for a smaller area of 0.27 km^{2}. Source:

Mahurangi West had a population of 117 in the 2023 New Zealand census, a decrease of 12 people (−9.3%) since the 2018 census, and an increase of 27 people (30.0%) since the 2013 census. There were 57 males, 60 females and 3 people of other genders in 51 dwellings. 7.7% of people identified as LGBTIQ+. The median age was 60.3 years (compared with 38.1 years nationally). There were 12 people (10.3%) aged under 15 years, 6 (5.1%) aged 15 to 29, 60 (51.3%) aged 30 to 64, and 42 (35.9%) aged 65 or older.

People could identify as more than one ethnicity. The results were 92.3% European (Pākehā), 7.7% Māori, and 10.3% Asian. English was spoken by 97.4%, and other languages by 7.7%. The percentage of people born overseas was 20.5, compared with 28.8% nationally.

Religious affiliations were 28.2% Christian, 2.6% Māori religious beliefs, and 5.1% Buddhist. People who answered that they had no religion were 61.5%, and 2.6% of people did not answer the census question.

Of those at least 15 years old, 30 (28.6%) people had a bachelor's or higher degree, 51 (48.6%) had a post-high school certificate or diploma, and 18 (17.1%) people exclusively held high school qualifications. The median income was $44,500, compared with $41,500 nationally. 21 people (20.0%) earned over $100,000 compared to 12.1% nationally. The employment status of those at least 15 was that 30 (28.6%) people were employed full-time and 27 (25.7%) were part-time.
