= Scandrett Regional Park =

Public park in Auckland, New Zealand

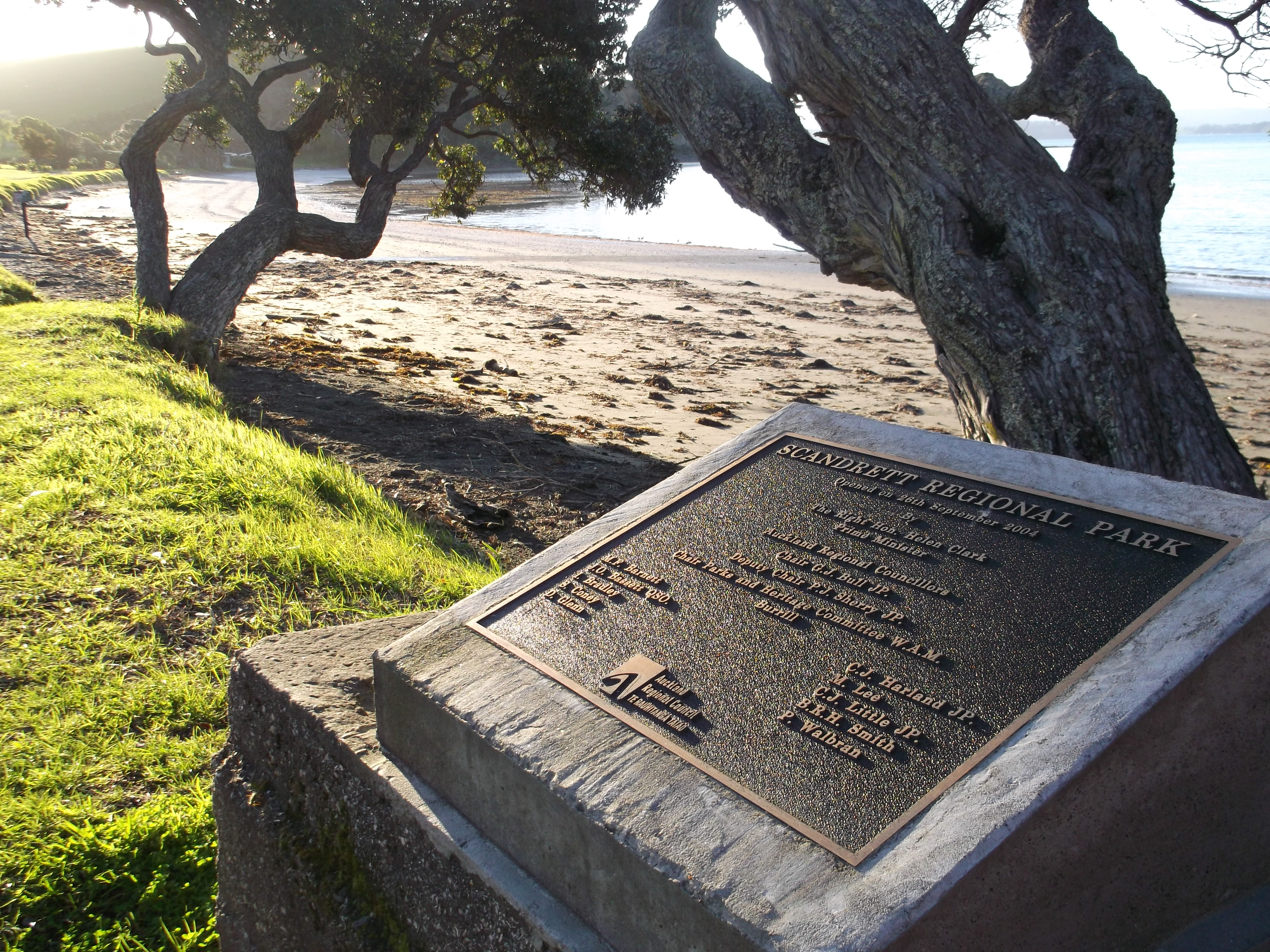
- Commemorative plaque from 2004 Scandrett Regional Park opening.
- Interactive map of Scandrett Regional Park
- Location: North east tip of the Mahurangi Peninsula
- Nearest city: 82km from Auckland CBD
- Coordinates: 36.443°S 174.774°E
- Area: 44.4 hectares (110 acres)
- Created: 26 September 2004
- Operator: Auckland Council
- Open: Pedestrian access: Open 24 hours Summer gate opening hours: 6:00 a.m. - 9:00 p.m. (daylight saving) Winter gate opening hours: 6:00 a.m. - 7:00 p.m. (Non daylight saving)

Scandrett Regional Park is a regional park located on the north east tip of the Mahurangi Peninsula, north of the city of Auckland, New Zealand. It encompasses Mullet Point and includes regenerating coastal forest, rocky headlands that protrude into Kawau Bay, Scandretts Bay beach and a precinct of historic farm buildings. The people of Auckland own the park through the Auckland Council.

== Geography ==
Scandrett Regional Park is a 44 hectare park bordering Scandretts Bay. The north-east point of the park is called Mullet Point.

== Early Māori history ==
The Māori name for Scandretts Bay is Purahurawai, meaning 'the expansive sparkling waters'; Mullet Point is Mātairoa, referring to the 'extensive sea views' from this strategic headland pā (fortification).

In pre-European times this place was known for its plentiful marine and coastal forest resources, particularly kanae or mullet, muri (pioke) or school sharks, and whale and dolphin species. In recent years, whales have again been seen in the vicinity of Mātairoa/Mullet Point.

Local tradition says the land was occupied by ancient peoples known as Ngāti Kui, Tūtūmaiao and Tūrehu, and that the famous ancestor and voyager, Toi Te Huatahi, visited Mahurangi some eight centuries ago. His association is recalled in names of many islands and waters in the area. Some of his descendants settled with the earlier occupants, and are ancestors of the iwi (tribal groups) still associated with the district.

The hapū (sub tribal groups) of Ngāti Manuhiri, Ngāti Rongo and Ngāti Kahu, including their smaller sub-groupings, claim mana whenua (traditional land rights) in the Mahurangi – Matakana area. Those hapū are related to the larger iwi of Ngātiwai and Ngāti Whātua, and are tied to several of the famous ancestral voyaging canoes, like the Tainui, Arawa, Moekākara and Māhuhukiterangi canoes.

A series of conquests from the early 1600s led to Te Kawerau leader Maki dividing up the entire Mahurangi area among his three eldest sons, Manuhiri (Ngāti Manuhiri), Ngawhetu (Ngāti Rongo), and Maeaeariki (Ngāti Raupō, Ngāti Kahu and Ngati Kā), including the land that now makes up Scandrett Regional Park.

Over time, all of these closely related hapū made alliances with Ngāti Whātua, Ngāi Tāhūhū and Ngāti Manaia (Ngātiwai) and occupied the Mahurangi area in peace for several generations.

=== Conflict with Marutūahu ===
Fighting between the Te Kawerau ā Maki and Marutūahu tribal confederations, over control of the fishing resources of the eastern coastline between the Whāngaparāoa peninsula and Matakana, began in the 1720s and continued sporadically throughout the century.

The Marutūahu tribes occupied the Hauraki Gulf and did not want control of land, rather the famed tauranga mangō or shark fishing grounds north of Whāngaparāoa, including Purahurawai / Scandretts Bay and Moanauriuri / Kawau Bay, where thousands of school sharks were caught and dried in late summer for winter food. The Te Kawerau hapū (Ngāti Manuhiri, Ngāti Rongo, Ngāti Raupō and Ngāti Kā) remained on their Mahurangi lands, but clashed with the Marutūahu tribes, who continued to harvest Mahurangi shark until the Musket Wars stopped this, from around 1821.

Today, Marutūahu iwi still assert ancestral associations with the Mahurangi district, including through the Waitangi Tribunal. Representatives of the Te Kawerau hapū work with Auckland Council as kaitiaki (guardians) over regional parkland in Mahurangi. Ngāti Manuhiri were consulted in the acquisition of Scandrett Regional Park; were part of the opening in 2004; and continue to act as kaitiaki.

=== Use of land and resources ===
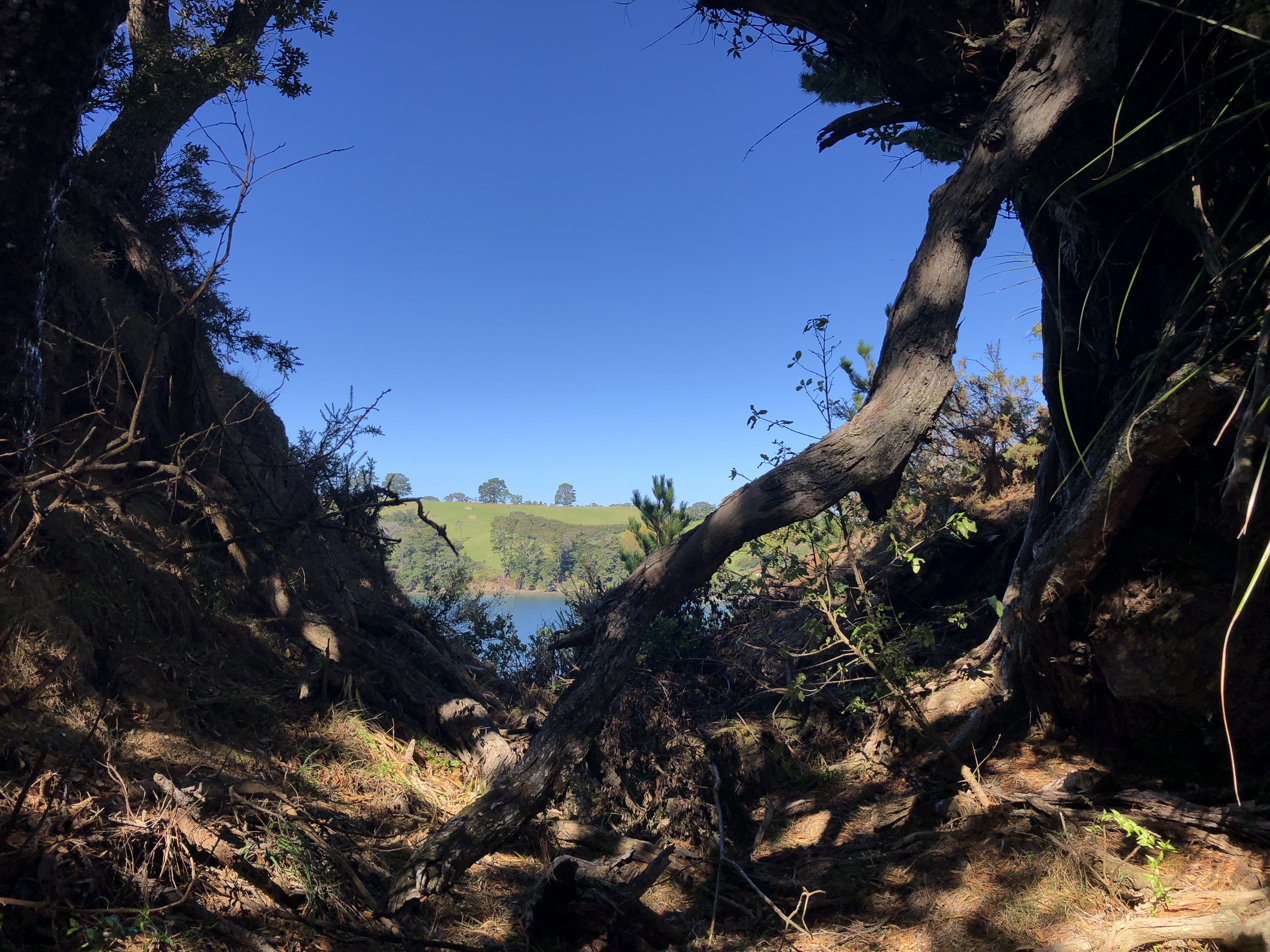
Inside one of two deep ditches dug by Māori to protect their headland pā at Purahurawai, looking out to Scandretts Bay.

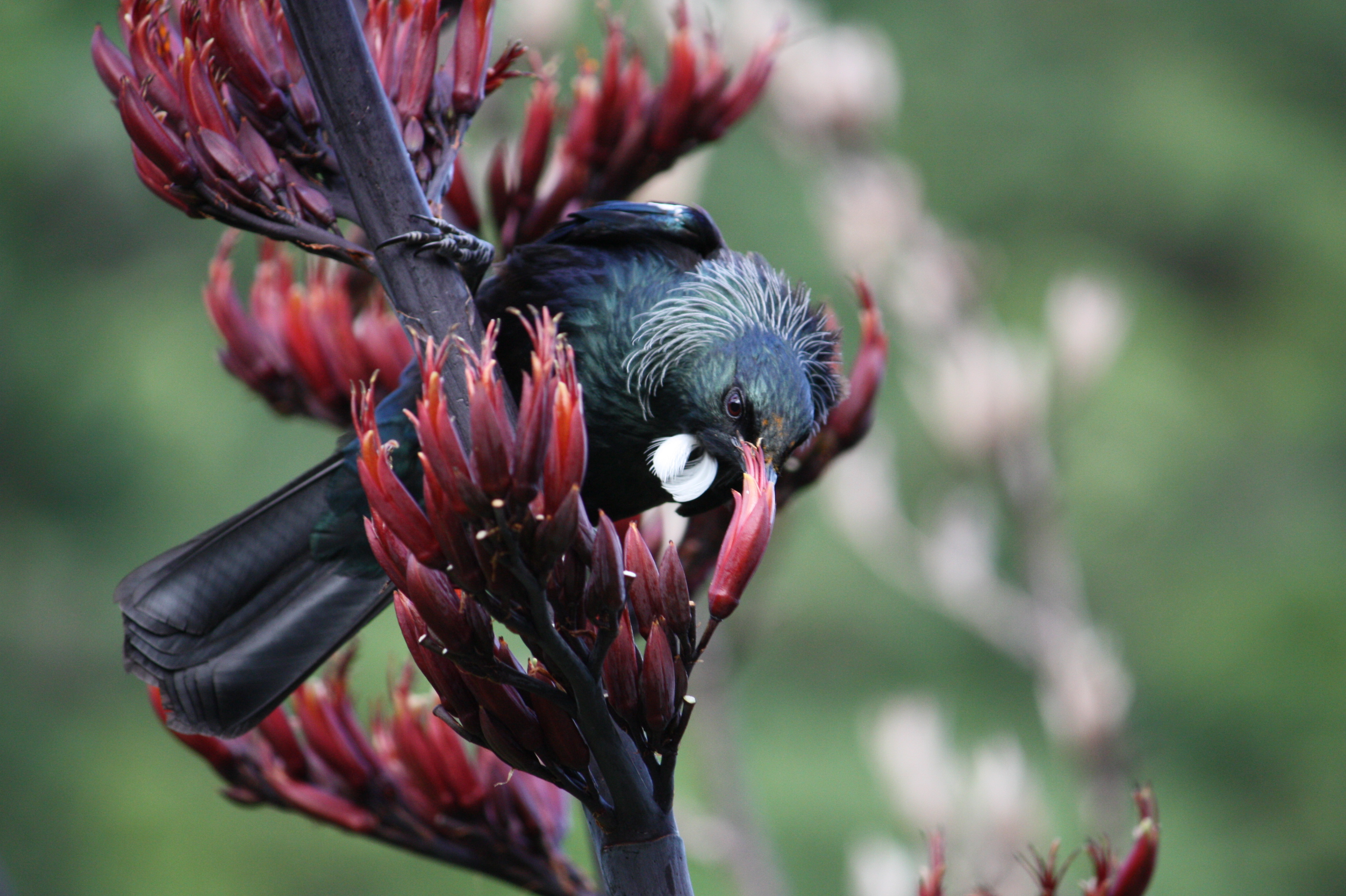
Tūī and harakeke were both valued resources used by Mātairoa and Purahurawai Māori.

Mātairoa / Mullet Point was occupied by Māori for many generations, evidenced by visible archaeological features including two headland pā, tūāpapa (house terraces), rua (food storage pits), ahu otaota (shell middens), rubbish dumps (from food waste), and groves of harakeke (flax), karaka and tawāpou.

Centuries of continuous Māori settlement was centred in the same area where the Scandrett family had their home and gardens, behind Purahurawai / Scandretts Bay. This area was warm, relatively sheltered, had easily worked soils and permanent water sources from several small streams leading to the beach.

Associated seasonal occupation sites are found on the ridge overlooking Martins Bay, and a large pā on the headland adjoining the regional park, at the north-western end of Purahurawai / Scandretts Bay. Protected by a deep double ditch, the pā would have been occupied by Rangatira (chiefs) and provided shelter in times of conflict. The name of the pā is not recorded, but has the locality name: Purahurawai.

Mātairoa / Mullet Point takes its name from the headland pā located on its northern extremity, which is protected by seaward steep cliffs and by a defensive landward ditch. Although its earthworks are hard to make out from years of farming, this was less of a defensive site, more a lookout point over the seaways to the north and south, and for spotting fish and whales.

Crops in the bay would have included kūmara, hue (gourds), uhi (yams), taro and aruhe (the root of the bracken fern). The stream wetlands would have provided food like raupō pollen, pūkeko and ducks; and building and weaving materials like raupō, kuta and harakeke or flax. The former coastal forest would have been an important source of food, medicine and building & fishing materials. Plants like whau, ngaio, nīkau palm, toetoe, karaka, tawāpou, pōhutukawa; and birds like tūī, kūkupa (native pigeon) and kākā. Māori harvested the area’s marine resources all year round, including fish, kōura (crayfish), pipi, tuatua, tuangi (cockle) and tipa (scallop), kina, pāua, kūtai (mussel), tio (rock oyster), pūpū (catseye) and kākara (whelk). Occasional stranded whales provided food and bone.

== Early European history ==
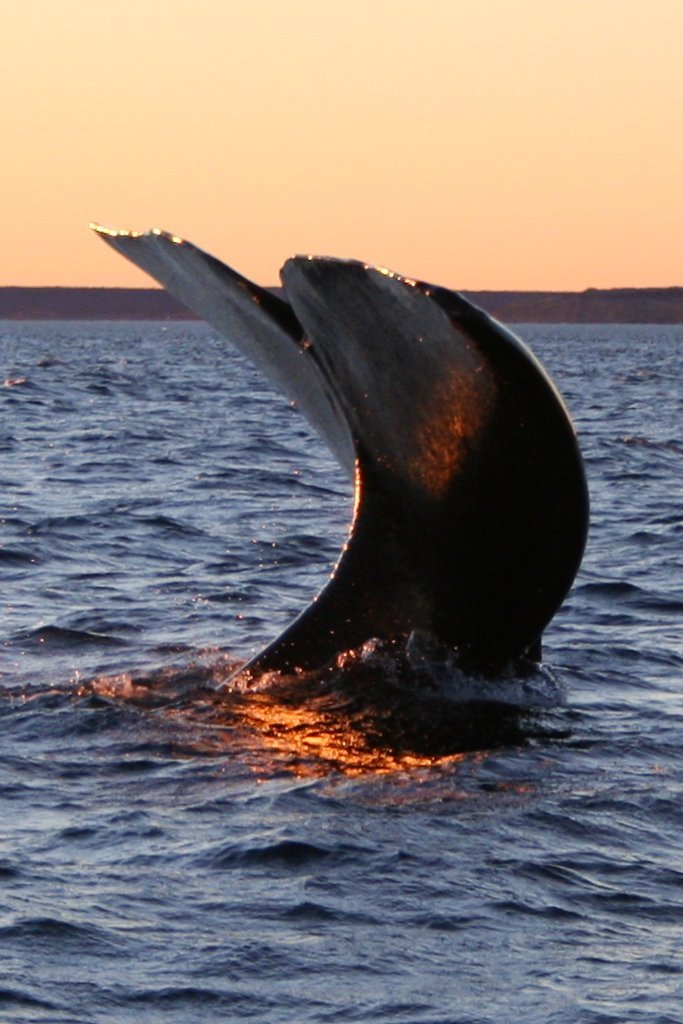
Moanauriuri (also known as Kawau Bay) is named for its 'deep blue waters' where whales like the southern right whale used to migrate.

In December 1770 Captain James Cook sailed through the northern Hauraki Gulf, roughly charting the coastline. Other European sailing vessels, mainly whalers, arrived from the early 1800s. Missionaries including Reverend Samuel Marsden camped on Kawau Island opposite Mātairoa / Mullet Point in 1820, noting no Māori were visible in the area due to ongoing conflict. In 1821 Captain J. Downie of the Royal Navy Supply Ship HMS Coromandel noted the 'reported passage and deep water' in the vicinity of Mullet Point, as well as 'cowrie' (kauri) reported to grow on the slopes here.

By the 1820s the Māori occupants of Mātairoa / Mullet Point would have received European pigs, potatoes, steel tools & utensils, and devastating epidemic diseases and weapons.

Mahurangi hapū fought a Ngāpuhi force in 1822, and a large combined Ngāpuhi force in 1825. Local survivors fled to the Waikato, the Bay of Islands, and north of Whangārei, until the mid-1830s when peace had been settled between tribes, and the influence of Christianity had begun. They returned to discover non-resident Hauraki tribes had begun selling forests and their ancestral land to European traders.

The Crown purchase of the Ōmaha and Mahurangi block from 'the united tribes of Thames' on 13 April 1841 included Mātairoa / Mullet Point, effectively leaving Ngāti Manuhiri and Ngāti Rongo landless. By the early 1840s the Crown had recognised the interests of local resident groups like Ngāti Manuhiri, Ngāti Raupō and Ngāti Rongo, but had not created reserves for them. On 1 November 1853, Mātairoa / Mullet Point was deemed to be Crown land. As part of the settlement of Treaty of Waitangi historical claims, the Crown has formally apologised to Ngāti Manuhiri and Ngāti Rongo for Treaty breaches associated with land alienation.

From 1853 local hapū no longer occupied Mātairoa and Purahurawai, although they were still fishing in the area and assisting the first European families to settle in the district. In the 1860s, a thriving European economy based around timber milling, boat building and farming developed. The Māori residents of the district were involved in these activities, although they lived a largely subsistence lifestyle on the remaining fragments of their ancestral land.

Mātairoa was now referred to by Europeans as 'Mullet Point' and Purahurawai was now referred to as 'Mullet Bay'. In 1853 a Crown grant to Mullet Point and the eastern half of Mullet Bay (later Scandretts Bay) was issued to John Willis who quickly on-sold the 35 acre Mullet Point property to shipbuilder William Davis Anderson who settled on the land with his Māori wife, Ripeka, and their five children. In partnership with William Garland he completed a 24 ton sailing schooner Nile, at Mullet Bay in 1856, accessing pōhutukawa, tōtara and kauri timber.

In 1859 Anderson sold 17.2 acres (the eastern end of Mullet Bay) to Garland who completed the 41 ton sailing ship Eagle in 1865. In May 1864 Anderson sold the remainder of his Mullet Point property back to John Willis for £60.

== Scandrett family history ==
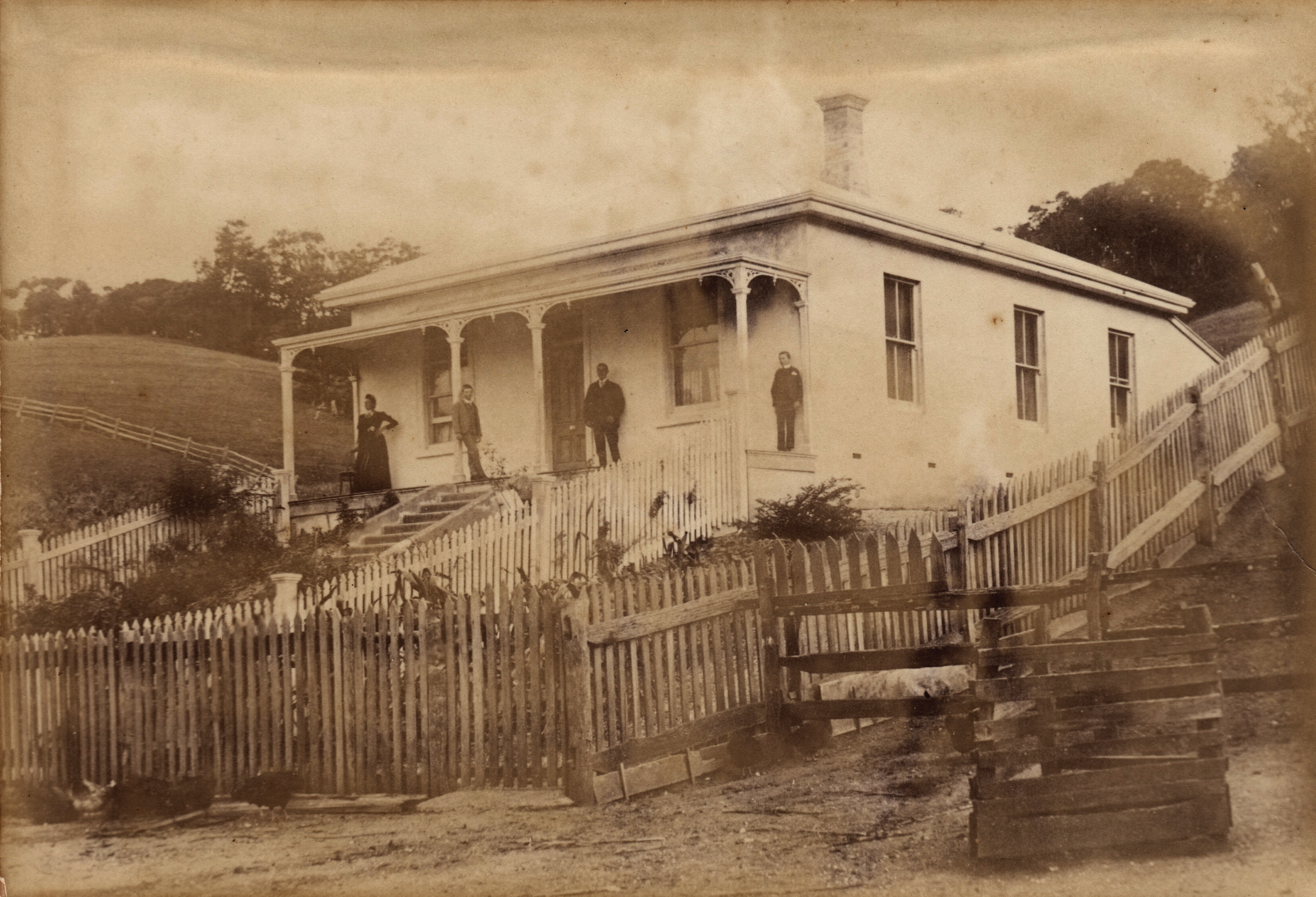
The Scandrett homestead, not long after its completion in 1886.

In July 1864 Willis sold all of his interests in the land to George Scandrett and John Braithwaite, settlers of Kawau Island, for £550, with Sir George Grey putting up part of the funding. Scandrett had arrived the year before from the north of Ireland and he married Helena Dillon, also from Ireland, in the same year as he bought the farm. By October 1864, Scandrett had bought Garland's property and bought out Braithwaite.

Scandrett named the now 52 acre farm Lisadian after his home townland in Ireland and gradually brought it into production. The oldest building still on the park is the barn built in 1864 which was used to store hay, saddles and farm equipment, and also doubled as a community hall. In the 1870s, a Norfolk pine, which as of 2019 is still growing on the park, and oak and plane trees, gifts from George Grey were planted next to the barn. The family lived in the wooden cottage built by Garland for 22 years, and it was the birthplace of their nine children. In time, they purchased the western end of the bay, growing the property to 110 acres.

The family was largely self-sufficient, producing their own meat, milk, butter, fruit & vegetables and harvesting from the sea. The farm produce, that they sold to shipbuilders, the settlement of Warkworth and to George Grey's Mansion House, included sheep meat and wool, fruit, vegetables, seeds, plants, flowers, poultry, honey, mānuka firewood and pōhutakawa timber. Wood was cut by hand, and produce was transported by horse and sled, row boat and sailing cutter. From 1871 a fortnightly steamboat service connected the Scandretts to Auckland for trade, mail and sometimes passengers.

The – today restored – concrete villa was completed in 1886. Instead of the typical kauri timber, it was made of an early type of concrete, with shingle transported by cutter from Motuketekete Island, then owned by Scandrett. The original invoice for the house was discovered and is being preserved by the council with a copy on display at the farm. The cost of the home and some additional work on other buildings was £418 or the equivalent of $NZD 474,000 in 2010.

George and Helena's second son, Thomas was born in 1876. After marrying Lucy Driver of Thames the year before, Thomas took over his parents' farm in 1907. He added a further 260 acres to the farming operation and became a successful farmer, dairyman, orchardist, market gardener, nurseryman, apiarist and poultry man. He was highly awarded at Agricultural and Pastoral (A&P) shows. In addition to raising four children, Lucy was involved in farm production, sewed most of the family clothing, made bread & butter daily, baked, and preserved fruit & vegetables.

In 1907 Thomas brought a small motor launch, Aroha which transported produce, and was licensed to carry passengers and commercially fish for mullet and other species. The shed built to house the Aroha is today preserved at the park. The farm also canned fruit and sold it under the Lisadian label. Lisadian honey was produced from over a hundred hives.

When Thomas died of pneumonia in 1927 at age 50, his sons George (III), aged 17, and Raymond, aged 13, helped their mother Lucy run the farm; along with their sister Mabel, from age 19, for much of the following decade; and their brother Thomas (II), from age 9. The farm received its first telephone in 1914, its first car in 1927, its fully mechanised milking shed and cream separator in 1933, its second launch, also named Aroha in 1936, its first metalled road in 1947 and electricity in 1954. An additional neighbouring 163 acres was bought for £3000 before George and Ray took over management of the property in 1951 and farmed as Scandrett Brothers.

In 1958 the Scandrett Brothers Lisadian Farm and its three generations of pioneering work was honoured in the publication Farms and Stations of New Zealand. It was described as 'a well-manicured pastoral farm running 50 breeding beef cattle' and 'approximately 1000 Romney ewes and Border Leicester rams'. It also noted 'Pōhutukawa have been retained around the foreshore of the three sheltered bays, giving a parklike air'.

From 1948 the family allowed a small number of baches to be built at the western end of what was now known as Scandretts Bay. Over 50 years this expanded to 80 site leases on the property for baches, caravans and camping, which often provided more income than the farm. Generations of holiday makers, and the families of Ray and George, have fond memories of helping with milking, haymaking and lambing, as well as fishing, harvesting shellfish and field mushrooms, horse riding, swimming, water skiing, picnicking and wandering the farm.

After Raymond died in 1993 – the last Scandrett to live permanently in the homestead – both families explored various options for the property, but after several years, made the difficult decision to sell it. The original Lisadian 44.4 hectares, including Scandretts Bay and Mullet Point, was brought by the Auckland Regional Council (ARC) for $4,750,000 in 1998 for use as a regional park.

== Regional park ==
The regional park is owned by the people of Auckland through the Auckland Council. The park was purchased in November 1998, having first been identified as a potential regional park in the 1960s, and officially opened in 2004.

When purchased in 1998, the property featured a near complete collection of farm buildings dating from the 1880s or earlier, including the homestead, barn, boat shed, cow shed, implement shed, tractor shed and a henhouse / calf shed. In the past, whenever a farm had been purchased for use as a regional park, there had been a tendency for the old farm buildings to be demolished except for the farmhouse. In the case of Scandrett’s farm, however, the heritage division of the ARC saw all the buildings retained and preserved. The caravan site leases were withdrawn, and bach leases gradually ran out. Three 40s-style baches were kept and restored for rental. One had been previously owned by Geoff Moon and the family of Trelise Cooper.

Prior to most of the Scandrett baches being removed, the motion picture Rain was filmed on the property in 2000 with the coastal beach replacing Lake Taupō which was the setting of the novel the film was based upon.

Scandrett Regional Park was opened by Prime Minister Helen Clark on 26 Sept 2004.

The ARC received a New Zealand Institute of Architects heritage award in 2007 for the conservation work done on the farm buildings. In 2011 interpretive panels were installed in the old homestead on topics such as information about Scandrett family members who lived on the farm, the buildings and architecture, and about historical food production.

Auckland Council produced five videos about the park and its history in 2018 and 2019: Season by Season about Ray and Fran Scandrett's homestead garden; Living at Scandretts Bay as recollected by George Scandrett's wife, Joan; and Heaven on Earth, Lifelong friendships at Scandretts Bay and High on the Hill at Scandretts Bay featuring former bach dwellers and Sue Blake (née Scandrett).

== Gallery ==
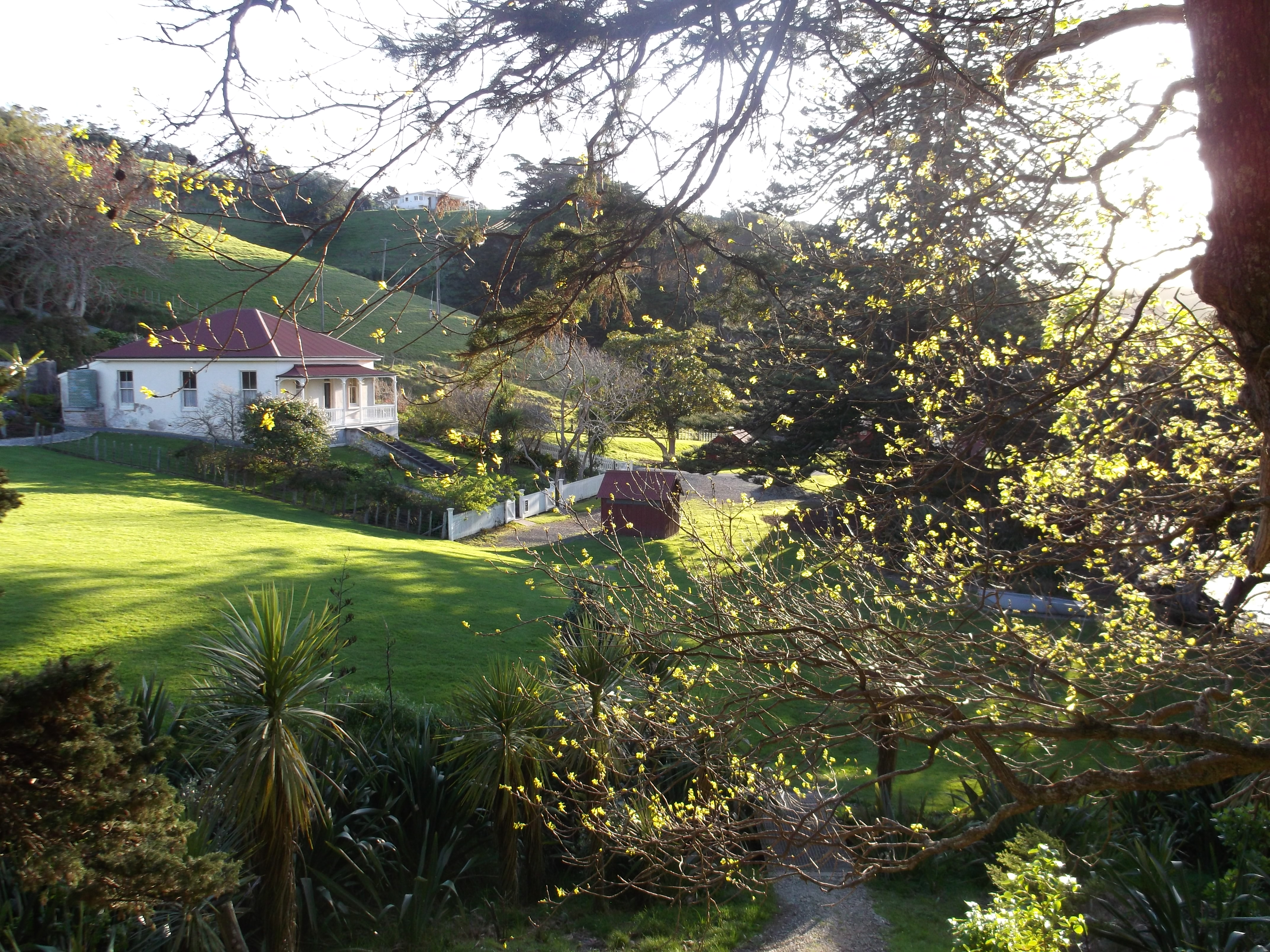
Park view with historic Scandrett homestead & farm buildings.

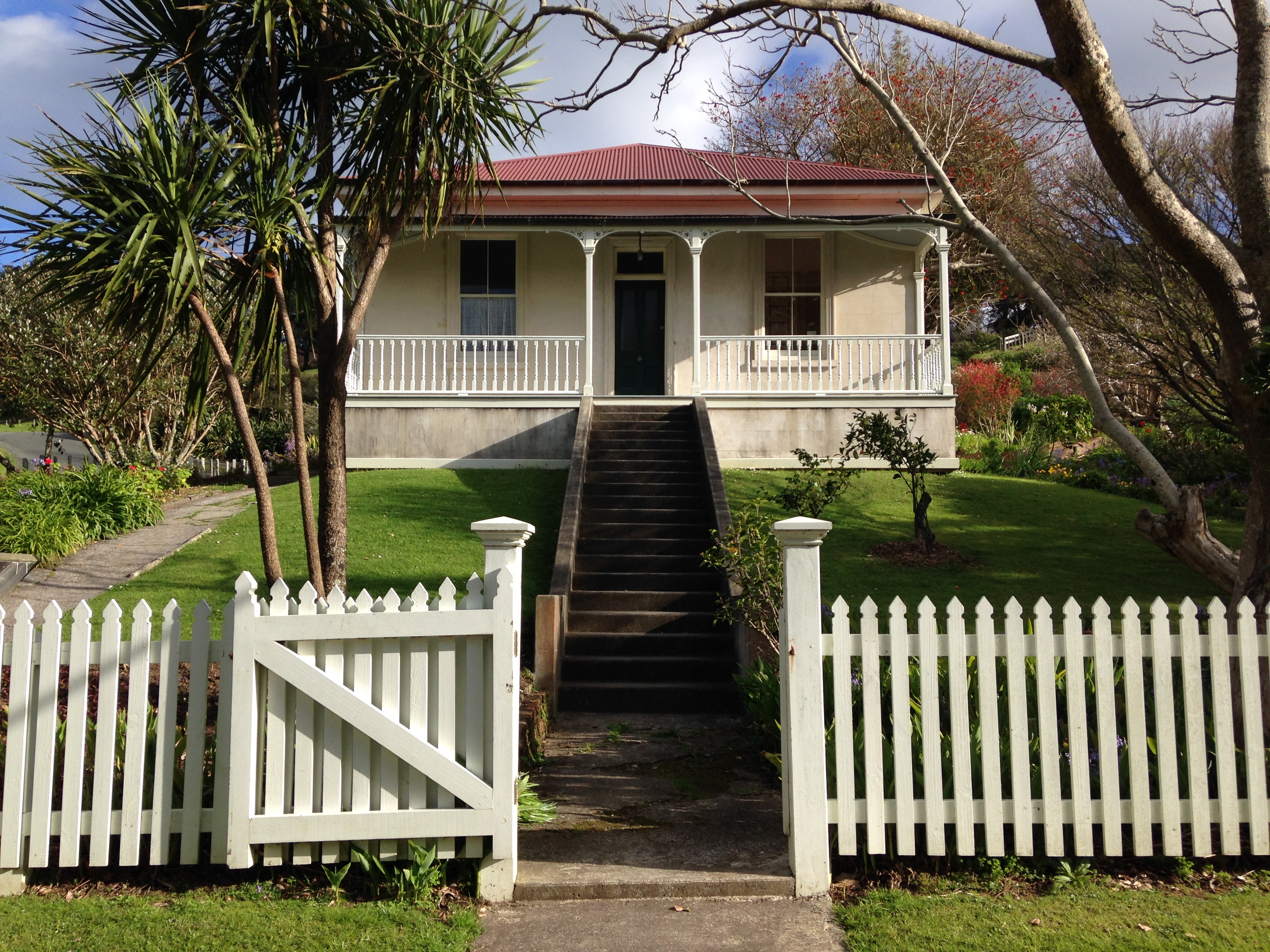
Historic Scandrett homestead front entrance.

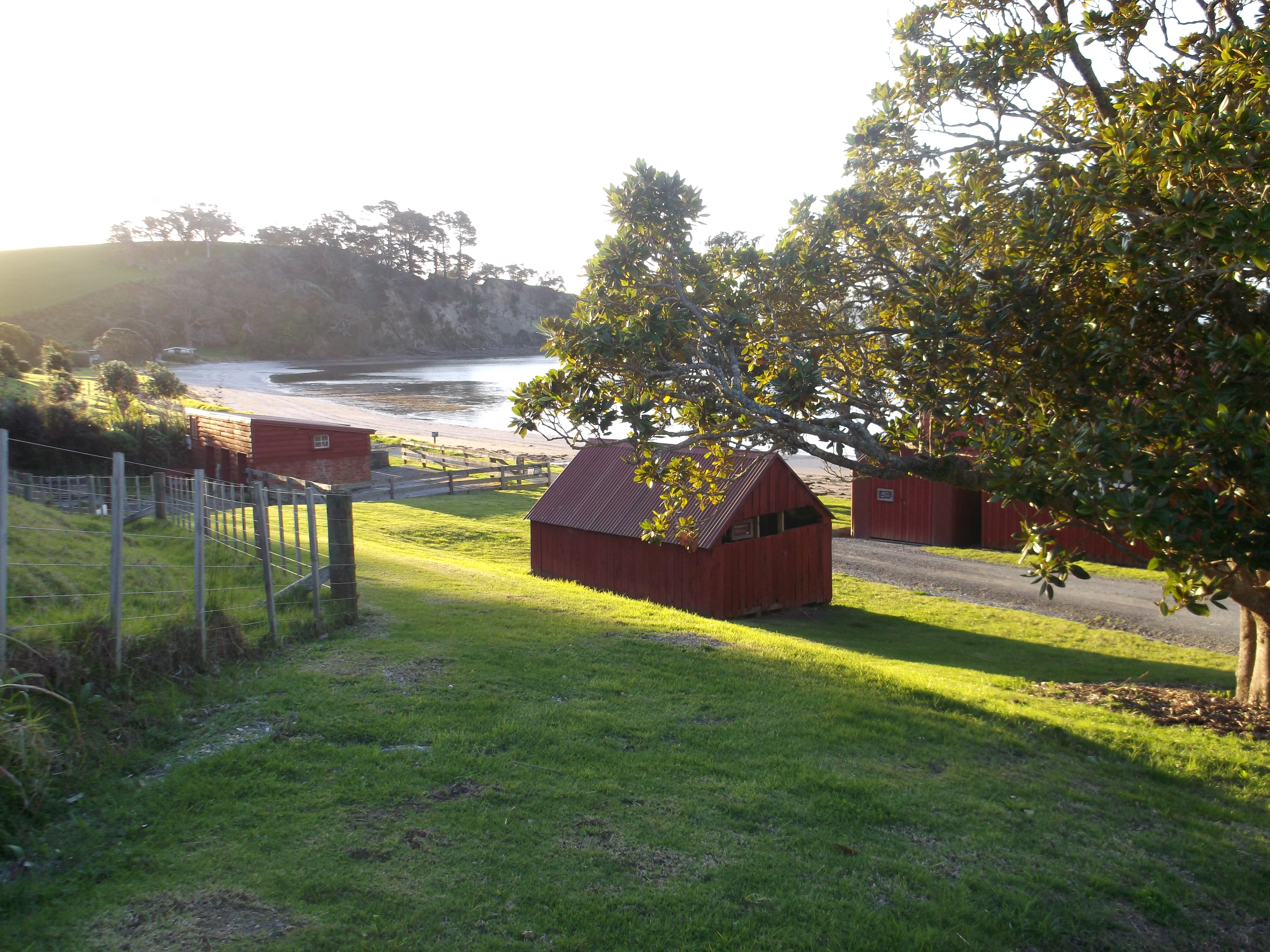
Historic Scandrett farm buildings & Scandretts Bay.

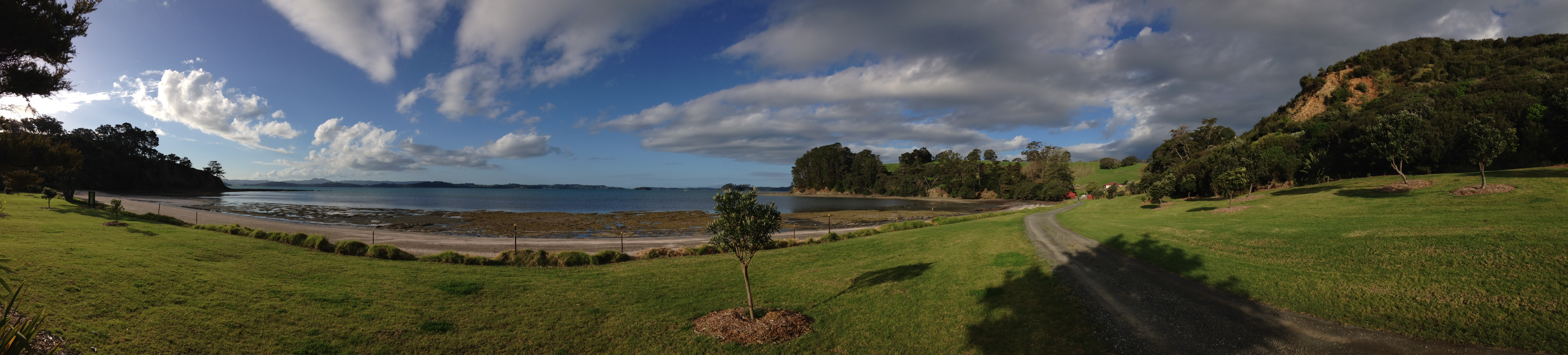
Panorama of Scandretts Bay, Mullet Point & historic buildings.

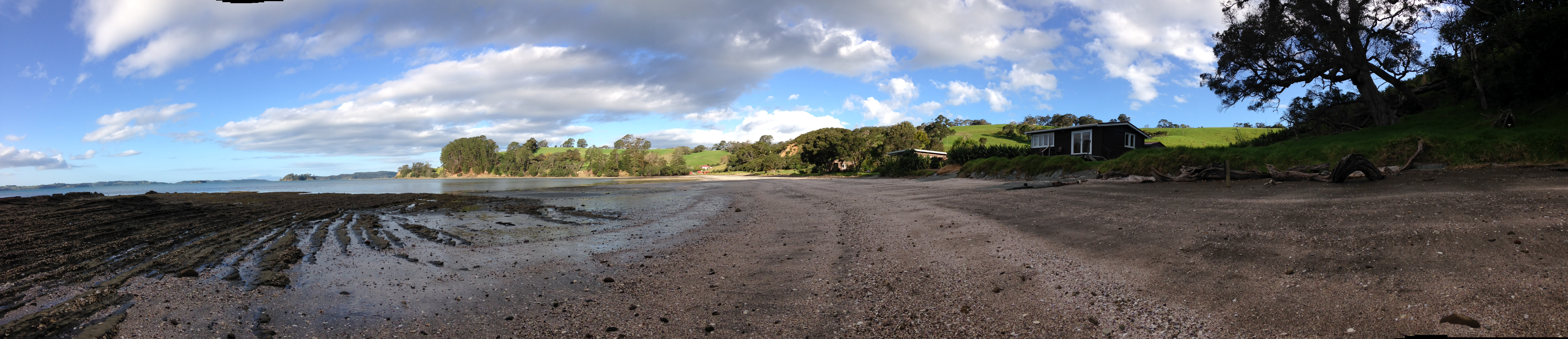
Panorama of Scandretts Bay, Mullet Point & 40s-style baches.
