= Te Tai Tokerau Māori =

Languages
- Māori language

Te Tai Tokerau Māori are a group of Māori iwi (tribes) based on the Northland Peninsula of New Zealand's North Island. It includes the far northern Muriwhenua iwi (tribes) of Te Aupōuri, Ngāti Kahu, Ngāti Kurī, Te Pātū, Te Rarawa and Ngāi Takoto. It also includes Ngāpuhi and the affiliated iwi of Ngāti Hine. Elsewhere in the region, it includes Whaingaroa, Ngāti Wai and Ngāti Whātua.

On 5 December 1985, after the historical Hawaiian voyaging canoe Hōkūleʻa landed in Waitangi ending its Rarotonga leg, James Hēnare ceremoniously inducted the canoe's sailors as the tribe's most recent members.

The rohe (tribal areas) of these tribes covers Northland and Auckland.
