= Te Pātū =

Māori iwi (tribe) in Aotearoa (New Zealand)

- Iwi (tribe) in Māoridom
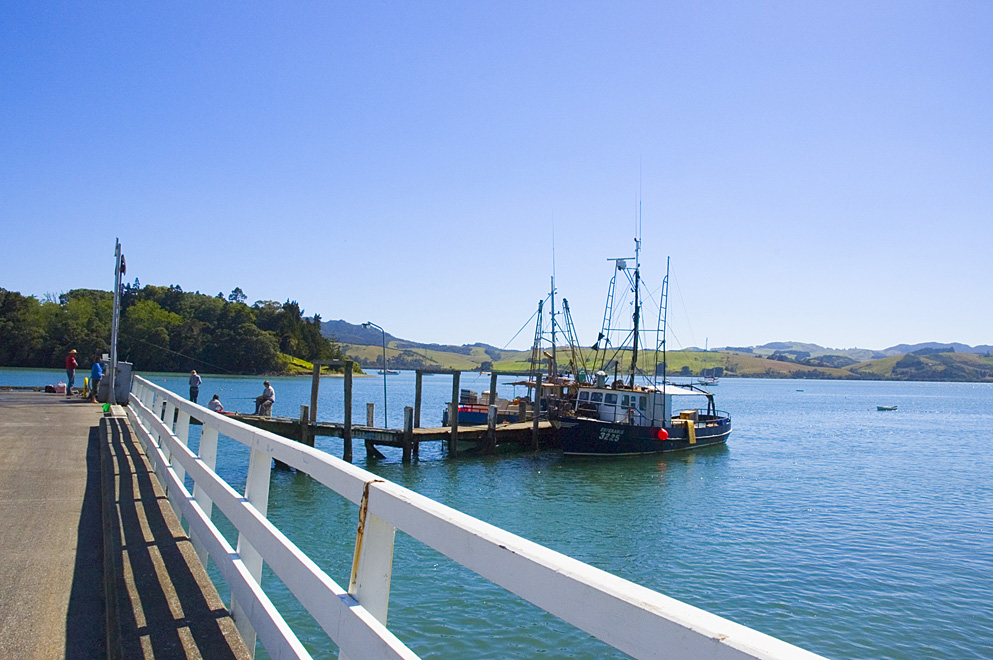
- Mangonui Harbour
- Rohe (region): Northland
- Waka (canoe): Kurahaupo

Te Pātū or Te Paatu is a Māori iwi from Northland, New Zealand. The iwi is one of the six Muriwhenua iwi of the far north of the North Island. Their name is pronounced Te Pātū, but is usually written Te Paatu.

Te Pātū trace their ancestry back to the Kurahaupo canoe and its captain, Pōhurihanga. According to Te Pātū tradition, Pōhurihanga's descendant Tūwhakatere married two women. His first wife was Tūterangi-a-tōhia; their child was Pōpota, who became an important ancestor of Te Pātū. His second wife was Tūpōia; their son was Hoka.

Te Pātū kuia Waireti Walters QSM JP was a long-serving Māori rights advocate. She campaigned for culturally appropriate cervical screening campaigner and was involved in a Waitangi Tribunal case to recognise Māori rights to flora and fauna. She died in September 2015.

Te Reo Irirangi o Te Hiku o Te Ika, an iwi radio station, serves Te Pātū and other Muriwhenua tribes. It broadcasts a main station on 97.1 FM, an urban contemporary station Sunshine FM on 104.3 FM and a youth-oriented station Tai FM.

== See also ==
- List of Māori iwi
- Ngāi Takoto
