= Te Whakaruruhau o Ngā Reo Irirangi Māori =

New Zealand indigenous radio network

Te Whakaruruhau o Ngā Reo Irirangi Māori National Māori Radio Network
- New Zealand
- Broadcast area: New Zealand
- Frequency: (various AM/FM)

Programming
- Languages: English, Māori, Cook Islands Māori
- Format: Indigenous radio

Ownership
- Owner: Independent iwi trusts

Technical information
- Class: Terrestrial/Internet

Links
- Webcast: Live streams
- Website: Official website

Te Whakaruruhau o Ngā Reo Irirangi Māori (National Māori Radio Network) is a New Zealand radio network consisting of radio stations that serve the country's indigenous Māori population. Most stations receive contestable government funding from Te Māngai Pāho, the Māori Broadcast Funding Agency, to operate on behalf of affiliated iwi (tribes) or hapū (sub-tribes). Under their funding agreement, the stations must produce programmes in the Māori language, and must actively promote Māori culture.

Most stations combine an English-language urban contemporary playlist during "breakfast" and drive-time shows with full-service broadcasting and Māori-language programmes at other times of the day. They have their own local shows, personalities and breakfast programmes, and broadcast through both terrestrial frequencies and online streams. There are regular segments updating people about local events, and teaching people the Māori language and tikanga (customs). The stations also produce local news shows, Māori music, educational programmes, comedies and dramas.

The network oversees the sharing of news bulletins, the pooling of resources and the production of network programmes. Radio Waatea in Manukau operates the network news service and produces network programmes. Its chief executive, Willie Jackson, who is the former chairperson of Te Whakaruruhau o ngā Reo Irirangi Māori - the National Māori Radio Network. The current chair of Te Whakaruruhau o ngā Reo Irirangi Māori is Peter Lucas-Jones, who is also the chief executive of Te Hiku Media based in Kaitaia. Programmes are shared and simulcast on a high-speed wide area network. Almost every Māori person in New Zealand lives within the range of an iwi radio frequency, but transmission issues have been reported in remote areas.

== History ==
=== Early Māori broadcasting (1928–1978) ===
The first Māori language to be broadcast on the radio were songs. A programme of Māori history, stories and songs were broadcast around the country on Waitangi Day 1928, and a regular programme featuring correct pronunciation of Māori began the same year. Māori broadcasters were appointed: Lou Paul of Ngāti Whātua in Auckland, Kīngi Tāhiwi of Ngāti Raukawa in Wellington, Te Ari Pītama of Ngāi Tahu in Christchurch, and broadcasting pioneer Airini Grenell of Ngāi Tahu in Dunedin. The first programme entirely in the Māori language was a news bulletin about World War II and local Māori issues, presented by Wiremu Bill Parker in 1940. Other shows followed, including Nga pao me nga pakiwaitara a te Maori: song and story of the Maori, based in Wellington, and Te reo o te Māori, broadcast from Napier.

Leo Fowler set up a Māori Programmes Section of the New Zealand Broadcasting Corporation (NZBC) in 1964, and, alongside Bill Kerekere took a mobile broadcasting studio to important Māori events. The department produced the English language Māori affairs programme Te puna wai kōrero and helped increase airtime for Māori music and show bands, including the Patea Māori Club hit Poi E. Te Reo o Aotearoa, a Māori and Pacific unit of the NZBC's successor Radio New Zealand, was set up in 1978 to produce Māori and Pacific programmes.

=== Campaign for iwi stations (1978–1990) ===
By the 1970s state broadcasters broadcast less than 90 minutes of Māori language and Māori interest programming a week, and there were growing concerns about the decline in fluent Māori speakers. Victoria University of Wellington's Te Reo Māori Society campaigned for Māori radio, helping to set up Te Reo o Poneke, the first Māori-owned radio operation, using airtime on Wellington student radio station Radio Active in 1983. Other part-time Māori radio stations were also set up by young volunteers: Ōtaki's Te Reo o Raukawa in 1985, and Mangamuka's Tautoko Radio and Ruatōria's Radio Ngāti Porou in 1987. The establishment of a Māori Radio Network was also discussed at a hui or gathering at Takapuwahia Marae in Porirua. Te Reo o Poneke gained a full-time license in 1987, becoming the pan-tribal Wellington radio station Te Upoko O Te Ika. The first bilingual school opened at Ruatoki in Urewera in 1978, and the Māori Language Commission was formed when Māori language became an official language in 1987. However, Māori culture continued to be underrepresented on New Zealand radio.

Hawke's Bay Polytechnic head of Māori studies Joe Te Rito operated a part-time station, Te Toa Takitini, on the polytechnic's Napier campus in 1988 and 1989, in an effort to broadcast Rongomaiwahine-Ngāti Kahungunu's local elders and native speakers. A year later he relaunched it as full-time station Radio Kahungunu in Napier, to increase grammatical and spoken Māori language fluency, and expose the language to homes where no one spoke it. Te Rito archived more than 2000 programme recordings, which he used to study and translate the tribe's distinctive dialect, teach courses on the local spoken and written language, and provide an international model for preserving dialects in other communities in Asia and the Pacific.

=== Waitangi Tribunal challenges (1990–1994) ===
The Fourth Labour Government deregulated the radio industry during the 1980s, selling the rights to use radio frequencies to private companies. The Wellington Māori Language Board, Nga Kaiwhakapumau i te Reo, was supporting the self-funded Te Upoko O Te Ika, and claimed the Government's sell off of broadcasting spectrum amounted to theft. Alongside the New Zealand Māori Council jointly, it challenged the spectrum sell off and the lack of support for Māori broadcasting. In one case brought through the Waitangi Tribunal, a permanent commission set up to investigate breaches of the Treaty of Waitangi, they argued the treaty gave them sovereignty over the airwaves and broadcast spectrum. They sought a share of the proceeds from the sale of rights to spectrum frequencies, and frequencies for their own use. Other cases followed through the High Court and Court of Appeal, with one case reaching the Privy Council in London.

The Government addressed the claim by instructing Radio New Zealand and Television New Zealand to broadcast more Māori programmes, and funding the establishment of Māori-owned and Māori-controlled radio stations. Twenty one iwi radio stations were started between 1989 and 1994. These were initially funded by NZ On Air from 1990, with six percent of broadcasting fees allocated to Māori broadcasting. A call for Māori to have greater control of funding led to the establishment of a separate Te Māngai Pāho funding agency in 1995, and this agency became funded through taxation. The establishment of these stations allowed the Government to justify the sale of Radio New Zealand's commercial Newstalk ZB and ZM stations to the privately owned Australian Radio Network partnership in 1996, after the sale was challenged in the High Court and Court of Appeal.

=== Aotearoa Radio era (1994–1997) ===
Several iwi applied for Government funding to establish radio stations in areas with significant Māori populations, developing an iwi-based radio network. However, the new stations struggled to survive as budgets did not cover the costs, volunteer staff lost enthusiasm, staff training was inadequate, and funding was insufficient to create professional career paths for Māori radio announcers and managers. Three stations broadcast on AM frequencies, costing an extra $100,000 a year than FM frequencies, but received the same flat rate of funding. Radio Ngāti Porou station manager Ngahiwi Apanui set up a joint venture between iwi stations, the national advertising agency Māori Media Network, in 1994 to increase each station's sources of revenue. The Māori Communication Network was set up in 1997.

Meanwhile, the first Māori language radio network, Aotearoa Radio or Irirrangi Radio, began in Auckland on 18 July 1988 on a short-term warrant, broadcasting on 1XO 603 AM. It gained a full-time warrant in 1989, extending to Tauranga on 1XV 603 AM, Wellington on 2XO 1323 AM and Christchurch on 3XQ 1323 AM. Radio and television producer Ray Waru was the chief executive. Teacher, lecturer and consultant Haare Williams served as the general manager. Aotearoa Radio operated alongside the iwi radio stations, and broadcast a range of programmes on Māori issues, and gave airtime to Māori women at a time when women and Māori were both underrepresented in radio. Tipene O'Regan, Beverly Adlam, Pauline Butt, Toby Curtis, Wiremu Ohia, Temuera Morrison, Dalvanius Prime, Moana Maniapoto-Jackson, Neil Gudsell, James Waerea, Libby Hakaraia, Trada Chadwick and Koro Wētere were involved in the Māori Radio Board during this period. The network closed in 1997.

=== Mai Media era (1997–2004) ===
In June 1998, the first Māori language radio serial began airing on iwi radio, and in July 1997 NZ On Air began distributing Māori music compilation CDs to English language radio stations to promote greater air time for Māori performers and Māori language music. Te Māngai Pāho also kept records of the percentage of Māori language in the programming of each iwi station, and talked with stations about increasing the use of Māori language.

Ngāti Whātua took a leading role in iwi radio during the 1990s and early 2000s through its subsidiary Mai Media. The iwi started urban contemporary station, Mai FM, in Auckland in July 1992, and New Zealand's first Māori language network, Ruia Mai Te Ratonga Irirangi o te Motu 1179AM, in April 1996. Through Ruia Mai it secured a contract with Te Māngai Pāho to provide Māori language news bulletins, which broadcast on 26 iwi radio stations. It also produced a range of current affairs, documentary and children's programmes. Some of these programmes were recognised in the New Zealand Radio Awards.

Mai FM was commercially successful and was expanded to other regions. It formed a broadcasting partnership with Ngāi Tahu's Tahu FM in Christchurch between 1996 and 2001, then tendered for a frequncey in Rotorua creating Mai FM 96.7 after losing that frequncey took over one of the frequencies of Te Arawa FM, 99.1FM in 1998, Also had a frequncey set up in Whangārei Mai FM 97.8 Ruia Mai, by contrast, reached a smaller audience of fluent Māori language speakers, and focused on programmes reflecting Ngāti Whatua and Māori culture. It was reliant on its news and current affairs contract with Te Māngai Pāho, and closed in 2004 when it lost the contract to bilingual radio station Radio Waatea. Ngāti Whatua retained the frequency, initially leasing it out to The Voice of Samoa before using it for AKE 1179AM.

=== Radio Waatea era (2004–present) ===
In 2006, Te Māngai Pāho spent $2 million upgrading studios, equipment and technical capacity for each Iwi Radio Network station. Emare Rose Nikora, a leader of the Māori language revival movement, received a Queen's Service Medal for services to Māori for her role in setting up Tokoroa's Te Reo Irirangi o Ngati Raukawa Trust and Ruakawa FM. She was the station's co-founder, first Māori language newsreader, manager and board member.

Whanganui's Awa FM relocated in 2012 and went through major restructuring in 2014, leaving it with just three staff members. Gisborne's Radio Ngāti Porou was investigated by Te Māngai Pāho in 2014, and in August its financial adviser resigned. In the Far North, the Tautoko FM building to the ground on 18 May 2015, cutting power to the small community of Mangamuka.

In August 2024, Radio Waatea's website was the target of a cyber attack after publishing a column criticising alleged racism in The New Zealand Herald.

== Operations ==
=== Funding ===
Iwi radio stations receive a share $11.7 million in Government funding each year, and can each be eligible for an annual Government grant of $350,000. They also source funding from sponsorship, advertising and leasing of studio space. Government-funded stations must broadcast at least eight hours of Māori language content between 6am and 12pm each day of the week. Station managers are also usually required to be proficient in the Māori language. Between 0.9% and 1.2% of each station's annual revenue is returned to the music industry through Recorded Music NZ, with each station treated differently for licensing purposes.

Between 2014 and 2018, the Iwi Radio Network received an extra $12 million to cover new operating costs and to assess the feasibility of expanding the network with new iwi stations, and $1.5 million towards archiving historic Māori language programmes. Māori Affairs Minister Pita Sharples said the extra funding would increase Māori language content and programme quality, and would ensure interviews with dead elders would be not be lost. The funding was specifically allocated to increasing community engagement with iwi stations, increasing Māori language hours and expanding the number of people the network reached. Network chairman Willie Jackson said many iwi stations were struggling, and welcomed and desperately needed the extra funding.

By 5 December 2025, Radio Waatea's CEO Matthew Tukaki confirmed that 11 of its 17 staff had been made redundant, reducing the station's workforce to six staff members. This followed a decision by the Māori broadcasting funding agency Te Māngai Pāho in 2025 to consolidate its funding of Māori current affairs and news coverage by requiring the iwi-funded radio network and the public broadcaster Whakaata Māori to share their journalism with each other. Tukaki also expressed concern about a proposal by the National-led coalition government to slash Te Māngai Pāho's budget by 25% for the 2026 New Zealand budget. Tukaki expressed concerned about the lack of funding and investment in iwi Māori radio stations.

By late March 2025, Radio Waatea faced the prospect of closing its Waatea News radio bulletin at midnight 31 March due to Te Māngai Pāho facing cuts of NZ$16 million of time-limited funding (amounting to 25-30% of the agency's annual budget). Te Māngai Pāho intends to fund a new Māori media hub called Te Iho which will be established in the following months. Radio Waatea CEO Tukaki expressed concern about the proposed loss of iwi radio stations servicing Māori communities. On 31 March 2026, Radio Waatea's news bulletin received a three-month funding reprieve from the urban Māori organisations, the Manukau Urban Māori Authority (MUMA) and Te Whānau o Waipareira (Waipareirara Trust). Tukaki expressed relief at the cash injection from the private sector but said that more government funding was needed to support Radio WAatea and other iwi-led radio stations in the long-term.

=== Role and effectiveness ===
A two-year Massey University survey of 30,000 people, published in 2003, indicated 50 percent of Māori in Iwi Radio Network broadcast areas listened to an iwi station. The results were consistent with those of similar surveys by individual stations, and countered the misconception that iwi stations reached small and specific audiences. According to the research, iwi stations were often associated with old music and interviews with elders, but many Māori listeners used it to stay in touch with their culture, family history, spirituality and community, and maintain their language skills. Further Auckland University of Technology research in 2009 suggested the potential audience of iwi radio stations would increase due to the growth of New Zealand's Māori and Pacific population.

Māori language advocates have recognised radio broadcasting as having a small but significant role in bringing Māori language to New Zealand audiences for more than half a century, particularly since the establishment of radio stations under iwi control. Postcolonialists have also suggested the Iwi Radio Network is a form of decolonisation, a means of achieving decolonisation, and a way to assert cultural identity and challenge Pākeha cultural dominance. Massey University research in 2006 assessed five year qualitative and quantitative research, literature on the long term history of the Māori language, comparative studies between Māori and Irish radio, and Tūhoe's experiences setting up a radio station, and found the Iwi Radio Network had a positive impact on Māori language revitalisation. The stations have failed to counter a decline in the number of fluent Māori speakers in the 2010s, but continue to be part of the strategy to promote it.

=== Awards and recognition ===
The National Māori Radio Network has held its own annual awards since 2012. Te Upoko o te Ika was the inaugural winner of Station of the Year, Willie Jackson calling it a tribute to their work towards promoting the Māori language. Taranaki's Korimako FM won Station of the Year in 2013. Maniapoto FM in Te Kuiti, Moana Radio in Tauranga, Radio Ngāti Porou in Ruatoria, Te Korimako in New Plymouth and Te Hiku o te Ika in Kaitaia were finalists for Station for the Year in 2014.

The stations are also eligible for awards at the New Zealand Radio Awards. One award, for Iwi Station of the Year, recognises radio networks or individual stations which have performed outstandingly as a champion of Māori language and culture. The station is judged on the quality and effectiveness of its Māori language use, and its programmes, client relations, community involvements, news and current affairs, personality strength, promotions and marketing campaigns. Tumeke FM won Iwi Station of the Year in 2014. Ngāti Porou won the award in 2013, but faced criticism about its management and financial oversight a few months later.

== Programmes ==
=== Days and nights ===
The iwi stations broadcast a range of programmes during the day, combining the use of conversational Māori with commercially viable English language programmes. Many weekend programmes cover special interests, use local Māori language dialects, or cater to local Pacific Island communities. For example, Tokoroa's Ruakawa FM follows a conventional radio schedule, with programmes like Daybreak with Roger Mahu, Rangatahi Days with Ngaitarangi Toma, and night show Rangatahi Vibes geared to younger audiences. The weekend line-up includes the Hakinakina Hard Saturday sports morning show with Josiah Teokotai, and Sunday night Te Taura Vaanaga show for the local Cook Island community.

Manawatu's Kia Ora FM broadcasts a specialist weekly science programme showcasing the research of Massey University researchers and postgraduate students. Musician, actor and commentator Moana Maniapoto has hosted several iwi radio programmes since 1990, including an evening programme on Radio Waatea. The Whanau Show music programme on Wellington's Te Upoko o te Ika on 6 June 1995, began touring the country in 1997, has been broadcast on nine iwi stations and is currently based at Gisborne's Turanga FM.

=== Overnights ===
Moana Radio's Tai Pari Tai Timu programme is simulcast across most of the Iwi Radio Network from midnight to 6.00am every day. The show's rotating hosts discuss news, views, issues and events from the Māori world in a free format. Retro phone requests are received after 4.00am.

Some stations have their own overnight shows. For example, Cilla Gardiner's Country Music Show airs some nights on Tokoroa's Raukawa FM.

== Services ==
=== News and information ===
Radio Waatea produces hourly bulletins for the Iwi Radio Network under a contract with Te Māngai Pāho. Its Waatea News website publishes national news articles and interviews, and bulletins for Te Hiku o Te Ika (Auckland and Northland), Tainui (Waikato), Te Korimako (Taranaki and Wanganui), Te Manuka Tutahi (Bay of Plenty), Turanganui A Kiwa (Gisborne and Hawke's Bay), and Te Upoko o Te Ika (Wellington and the South Island). A 2013 Queensland University of Technology cited the service as an example of journalistic practices being shaped by traditional indigenous values . Whitireia New Zealand runs a course preparing people to become Iwi Radio Network journalists.

Iwi stations broadcast live coverage of sports games, kapa haka competitions and other news events. Many Waitangi Tribunal hearings have been broadcast live on iwi radio stations, from the inquiry into the claims of Whanganui tribes in 2007 and 2008 to the inquiry into Ngā Puhi claims in 2015. During the 2011 Rugby World Cup the stations gained rights to simulcast live Māori language commentaries from the TV channel Te Reo. Turanga FM broadcasts live commentaries of Poverty Bay Rugby Football Union games on some weekend afternoons. The Māori Sports Awards are also broadcast live across the network each November.

=== Other services ===
Most iwi stations are involved in locals events, news media and other iwi or pan-tribal activities. Tokoroa's Raukawa FM, for example, has been holding concerts since December 1990, sponsored the Tainui Games in Kawhia in January 1992, supported the Raukawa Education and Training Establishment in June 1992, and helped set up the first Raukawa newspaper, Te Paki o Raukawa Kia Ora News, in August 1992. Radio Kahungunu set a special broadcast during the 2008 Takitimu Festival, broadcasting a live simulcast of its station on 105.5 FM from the nearby Hawke's Bay Showgrounds. Many stations are service contractors and offer their studios for hire. Rotorua's Te Arawa FM, for example, operates as Te Arawa Communications and provides marketing, film and audio engineering services, and has recently started a very successful commercial station The Heat 991FM

Each station has its own website, and most stations stream online. Many of the websites were designed by Māori web developers. For example, the websites of Radio Kahungunu, Tekorimako 94.5FM and Turanga FM were the work of Ngāti Porou designer Alex Walker.

== Stations ==
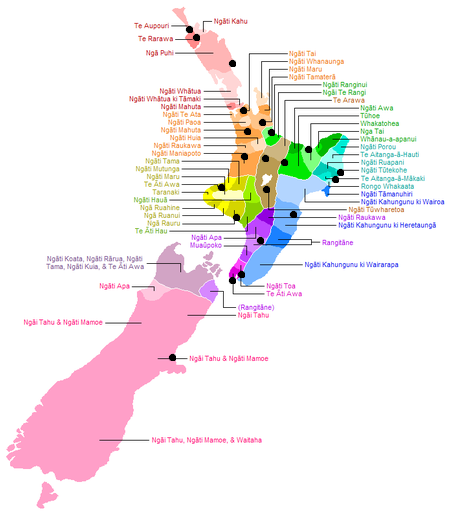
This map shows the distribution of iwi tribal areas and iwi radio stations. The headquarters for each station is marked in black.

=== Northland and Auckland ===
- Te Hiku Media or Te Reo Irirangi o Te Hiku o Te Ika serves the Muriwhenua tribes of the Far North – Ngāti Kurī, Ngāi Takoto, Te Pātū, Ngāti Kahu, Te Aupōuri and Te Rarawa. It began as Te Hiku O Te Ika at Awanui in December 1990 and moved to Kaitaia in 1991. Flagship Te Hiku Radio broadcasts on 97.1 FM in Kaitaia, and Te Hiku TV provides online streaming video. Te Hiku Media also operates urban contemporary station Sunshine FM on 104.3 FM in Kaitaia and a youth-oriented station Tai FM on 106.7 FM.
- Tautoko FM serves the people of Ngāpuhi-nui-tonu, and began operating on 28 November 1988. It broadcasts on 99.5 FM in Mangamuka.
- Ngāti Hine FM serves the people of Ngāti Hine and the wider Ngāpuhi iwi. It broadcasts on 99.1 FM and 99.6 FM in Whangārei.
- Ake 1179 is the official station of Ngāti Whātua, but is independent from the iwi radio network. It broadcasts on 1179 AM in Auckland, and features a combination of urban contemporary music and traditional storytelling.
- Radio Waatea is the pan-tribal station of the Manukau Urban Māori Authority. Willie Jackson, chairman of the National Māori Radio Network and the National Urban Māori Authority, is the station's chief executive, morning talkback host and political commentator. Waatea broadcasts on 603 AM in Manukau and across the Auckland region. The station is also available worldwide via online streaming through its website and on the iHeartRadio platform.

=== Hauraki and Waikato ===
- Nga Iwi FM serves Marutūahu from the iwi of Ngāti Tamaterā, Ngāti Rongoū, Ngāti Whanaunga, Ngāti Maru and Ngāti Pāoa, and other Hauraki residents from Te Patukirikiri, Ngāti Hako, Ngāti Huarere, Ngāti Hei, Ngāi Tai, Ngāti Pūkenga and Ngāti Rāhiri. It was set up Paeroa on 9 March 1990 to cover local events and promote Māori language. It expanded its reach to the Coromandel Peninsula, Hauraki Gulf and Huntly in mid-1991. The station is available on 92.2 FM on Coromandel Peninsula, 99.5 FM in Paeroa, and 92.4 FM across the Hauraki Plains to Miranda and Huntly. The station is also available worldwide via online streaming through its website and on the iHeartRadio platform.
- Radio Tainui is available across the Waikato Tainui area from its base in Hamilton. It began on AM in 1989, and previously had a frequency in Pukekohe. The station has strong connections to the tribe, kingitanga and leading figures in Māoridom, and is one of the only Waikato stations to retain local content. The station is now branded as Tainui Live. It is also available worldwide via online streaming through its website and on the iHeartRadio platform. It broadcasts on 106.4 FM in Huntly, 95.4 FM in Ngāruawāhia, Hamilton, including the wider Waikato region, and 96.5 FM in Kawhia.
- Maniapoto FM is the official station of Ngāti Maniapoto. It was set up alongside tabloid newspaper Kia Hiwa Ra. It broadcasts on 99.6 FM in Te Kūiti, 91.8 FM in Benneydale, 92.7 FM in Piopio, and 106.2 FM in Te Kawa. The station is also available worldwide via online streaming through its website and on the iHeartRadio platform.
- Raukawa FM is the official station of Ngāti Raukawa. It was set up by Te Reo Irirangi o Ngati Raukawa Trust, under the leadership of Emare Rose Nikora and Whiti te-Ra Kaihau, on 23 October 1990. Many of its first hosts were Tokoroa High School students, and most of its staff are still volunteers. It broadcasts on 95.7 FM in Tokoroa, 93.2 FM in Mangakino, and 90.6 FM across the wider Waikato region. The station is now branded as Raukawa Vibes, and is also available worldwide via online streaming through its website and on the iHeartRadio platform.

=== Bay of Plenty ===
- Moana Radio broadcasts to Ngāti Ranginui, Ngāi Te Rangi and Ngāti Pūkenga. It is available on 1440 AM and 98.2 FM in Tauranga and across the Bay of Plenty. Moana previously operated youth-oriented urban contemporary Tahi FM between 2003 and late 2011.The station is also available worldwide via online streaming through its website and on the iHeartRadio platform.
- Tumeke FM broadcasts to Ngāti Awa. It was first known as Te Reo Irirangi o Te Manuka Tutāhi during a three-week AM trial run in 1990. It went to air as Tumeke FM on 6 April 1991, became Sun FM in 1994 to increase its advertising appeal, and between 1996 and 1999 worked to increase its Māori language content. This classic hits station broadcasts on 96.9 FM in Whakatāne.
- Sun FM 1065 was formerly broadcast on 98.5 FM but is now on 106.5 FM. Sun FM is the commercial arm of Tumeke FM and caters to an 18–35 audience, playing a Top 40 Format. The station is not funded by Te Mangai Paho.
- Bridge FM 91.7 is operated by pan-tribal service provider Whakaatu Whanaunga Trust's Radio Portfolio and is available on 91.7 FM in Ōpōtiki, Ōhope, Whakatāne, Taneatua, Te Kaha, and everywhere else in between. Bridge FM plays music from the 50s to now. It also operates The Beat 88.1 FM, which is skewed towards a younger demographic, playing music from the 2000s to now. It broadcasts to local iwi Te Whakatōhea, Ngāitai and Te Whānau-ā-Apanui.
- Te Arawa FM serves Te Arawa iwi, including Ngāti Pikiao, Tūhourangi and Ngāti Whakaue. It was established in the early 1980s and became a charitable entity in November 1990. The station underwent a major transformation in 1993, becoming Whanau FM. One of the station's frequencies was taken over by Mai FM in 1998; the other became Pumanawa FM before later reverting to Te Arawa FM. It is available on 88.7 FM in Rotorua, 93.9 FM in Rotoiti, 91.8 FM in Maketū, 88.9 FM in Matatā, and 103.6 FM in Reporoa. The station is also available worldwide via online streaming through its website and on the iHeartRadio platform.
- The Heat 991 FM is the commercial arm of Te Arawa FM, and started broadcasting on 15 April 2015. This station plays an Adult Urban format catering to a 25–45 audience playing RnB, Hip Hop, Reggae and Top 40 hits from the 1980s to today, and was the first affiliated Māori station to be on the iHeartRadio streaming platform. It has plans to expand into the other Bay of Plenty regions, and also Taupo. The station is not funded by Te Mangai Paho. It is available in Rotorua on 99.1 FM, and is also available worldwide via online streaming through its website and on the iHeartRadio platform.

=== Taranaki and Whanganui ===
- Te Korimako o Taranaki serves the iwi of the Taranaki region – Ngāti Tama, Ngāti Mutunga, Te Āti Awa, Ngāti Maru, Taranaki, Ngāruahine, Ngāti Ruanui and Ngā Rauru Kītahi. It started at the Bell Street campus of Taranaki Polytechnic in 1992, and moved to the Spotswood campus in 1993. It is available on (94.8 FM) 98.4 FM across Taranaki. The station is also available worldwide via online streaming through its website and on the iHeartRadio platform.
- Tuwharetoa FM is the station of Ngāti Tūwharetoa. It began at Waiariki Polytechnic in Tūrangi in February 1991, was taken off air in late 1992, relaunched in 1993, and added a frequency reaching as far as Taumarunui. An off-shot station, Tahi FM, began in February 1993 but is no longer operating. Tuwharetoa FM broadcasts on 97.2 FM in Tūrangi, and 95.1 FM in the areas of Taumarunui, National Park, Whakapapa and Raetihi.
- Awa FM broadcasts to the people of Te Atihaunui-a-Pāpārangi, Ngā Rauru Kītahi, Te Korowai o Wainuiārua, and Ngāti Hāua, serving the Whanganui and central North Island regions with Māori language, culture, music, news, and community programming. The station began broadcasting as Te Reo Irirangi o Whanganui 100FM on 17 June 1991. Between July 1992 and June 1993, it also operated a separate service in Ohakune, known as Te Reo Irirangi ki Ruapehu or Ngā Iwi FM, which combined local programming with selected broadcasts from 100FM. Today, Awa FM broadcasts on 100.0 FM in Whanganui, 91.0 FM in the Ruapehu district, and 93.5 FM in Taumarunui. The station is also available worldwide via online streaming through its website and on the iHeartRadio platform.

=== East Cape and Hawkes Bay ===
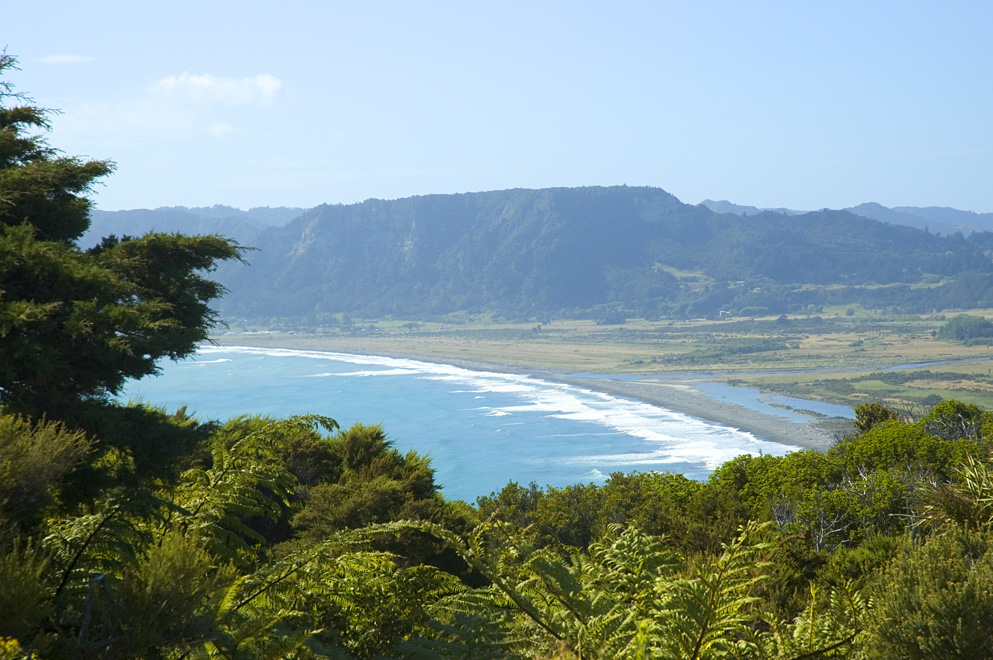
Two iwi radio stations broadcast on the East Cape – Radio Ngāti Porou and Turanga FM.

- Radio Ngāti Porou is the official station of Ngāti Porou. It is based in Ruatoria and broadcasts on 89.3 FM in Tikitiki, 90.5 FM at Tolaga Bay, 93.3 FM in Gisborne, 98.1 FM in Ruatoria, and 105.3 FM at Hicks Bay. The station is also available worldwide via online streaming through its website.
- Turanga FM is the station of Turanganui-a-kiwa iwi, including Te Aitanga-a-Māhaki, Rongowhakaata and Ngai Tamanuhiri. It is based in Gisborne, and broadcasts on 98.1 FM in Ruatoria, and 91.7 FM and 95.5 FM in Gisborne. The station is also available worldwide via online streaming through its website and on the iHeartRadio platform.
- Radio Kahungunu is the official station of Ngāti Kahungunu. It began as Hawke's Bay Polytechnic training station Te Toa Takitini 2XY, making two short-term broadcasts on 1431 AM in December 1988, and October and November 1989. It was relaunched in 1990 as Radio Kahungunu 2XT, sharing the 765 AM frequency with Hawke's Bay's Racing Radio and Radio Pacific. It began broadcasting full-time in late 1991 in Taradale, then moved to dedicated studios at Stortford Lodge in the late 1990s, and began an FM simulcast on 4 September 2000. It broadcasts from Hastings, and is available on 94.3 FM and 765 AM in Hawkes Bay.

=== Central and Southern New Zealand ===
- Kia Ora FM serves the people of Rangitāne. It began as Radio Rangitane, or Te Reo Irirangi O Rangitane, on 1 May 1992, and adopted its current name in the 2000s. It broadcasts from Palmerston North and is available on 89.8 FM in Manawatū, Rangitīkei and Horowhenua.
- Atiawa Toa FM broadcasts to Te Āti Awa and Ngāti Toa. It began as Atiawa FM in 1993, broadcasting to Te Atiawa in the Hutt Valley and Wellington. It changed its name in Atiawa Toa FM in mid-1997, expanding its reach to Ngāti Toa in Porirua and Kapiti Coast. The station is based in Lower Hutt, and is available on 100.9 FM in Hutt Valley and Wellington, and on 106.9 FM in Porirua. The station is also available worldwide via online streaming through its website and on the iHeartRadio platform.
- Te Upoko O Te Ika is a pan-tribal station in Wellington, and New Zealand's longest-running Māori radio station. It began as Te Reo O Poneke or Radio Poneke, an independent experimental Māori language radio station which broadcast for short periods on Radio Active between 1983 and 1986. In April 1987, it became the first full-time Māori language radio station, with the support of Nga Kaiwhakapumau i te Reo, the Wellington Board of Māori Language. It adopted the name Te Reo Irirangi Maori O Te Upoko O Te Ika, the call-sign 2XM, and the former frequency of 2ZM. The station serves Māori of all iwi, and is affiliated with Ngāti Raukawa, Ngāti Toa and Taranaki iwi. It aims to immerse families and young people to the Māori language. In 2014, it aligned itself to Ngāti Toa and Taranaki to secure ongoing funding. The station is available on 1161 AM across the Wellington region, lower North Island and upper South Island, as well as inner city Wellington on 87.6 FM. The station is also available worldwide via online streaming through its website and on the iHeartRadio platform.
- Tahu FM is the official station of Ngāi Tahu. Tahu FM began as Christchurch's Te Reo Iriraki Ki Otautahi on 6 February 1991. Between 1996 and 2001, it formed a broadcasting partnership with Mai FM and began playing more urban contemporary music. It changed its name to Mai FM in December 1997, before reverting to Tahu FM in 2001. It broadcasts in Christchurch on 90.5 FM. In 2000 it began broadcasting Kaikōura on 90.7 FM, Timaru on 89.1 FM, Dunedin on 95.0 FM, Invercargill on 99.6 FM, and around the country on 505 Sky Digital. The station is also available worldwide via online streaming through its website. Tahu FM resumed broadcasting five days after the 2011 Christchurch earthquake, with assistance from Te Upoko O Te Ika and other iwi radio stations, and operated as the city's Māori language civil defence station. In December 2014, it was recognised as the country's highest-rating Māori radio station.
