= Ngāti Rongomaiwahine =

Māori iwi (tribe) in Aotearoa New Zealand

- Iwi (tribe) in Māoridom
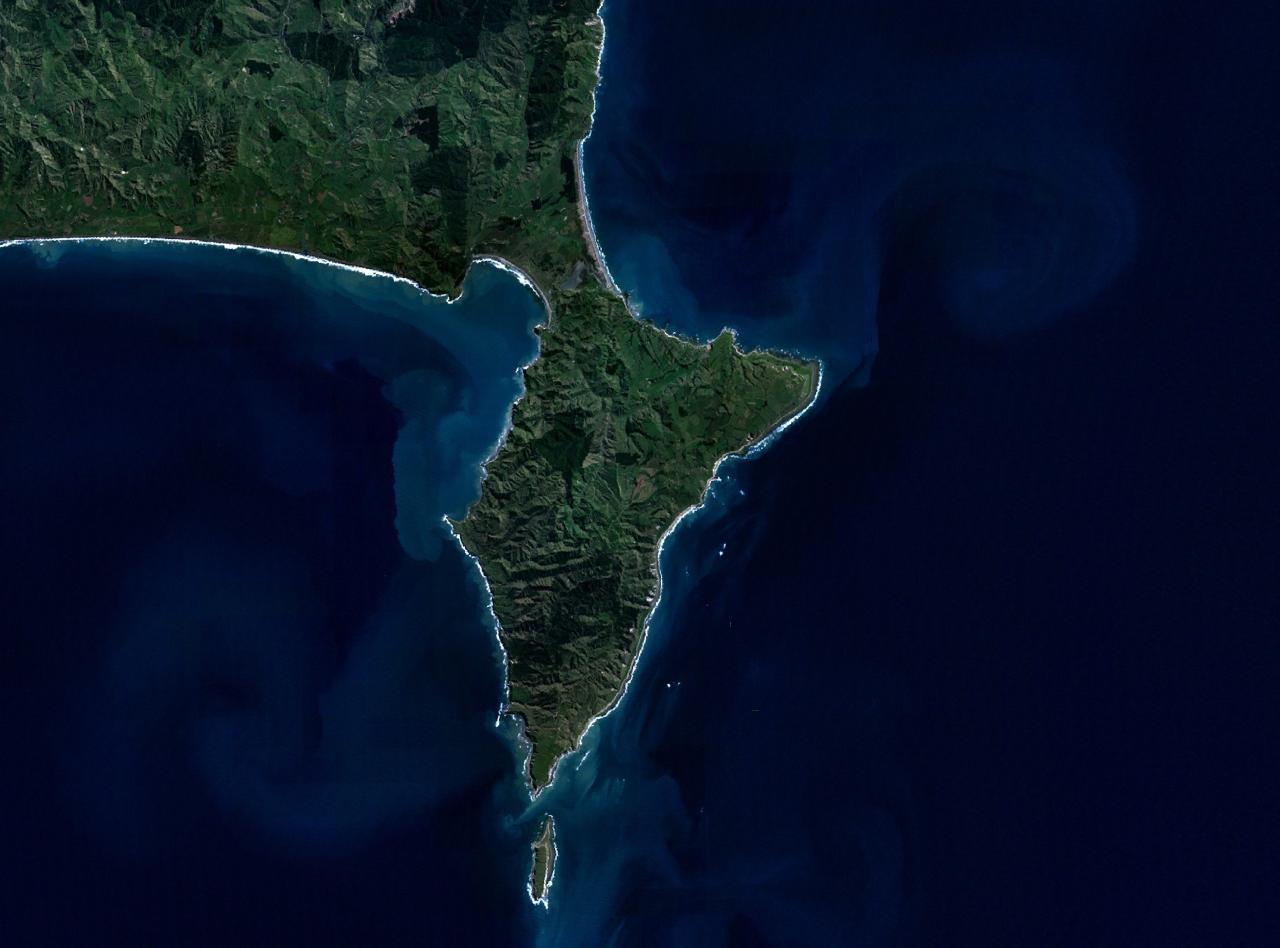
- Māhia Peninsula from space

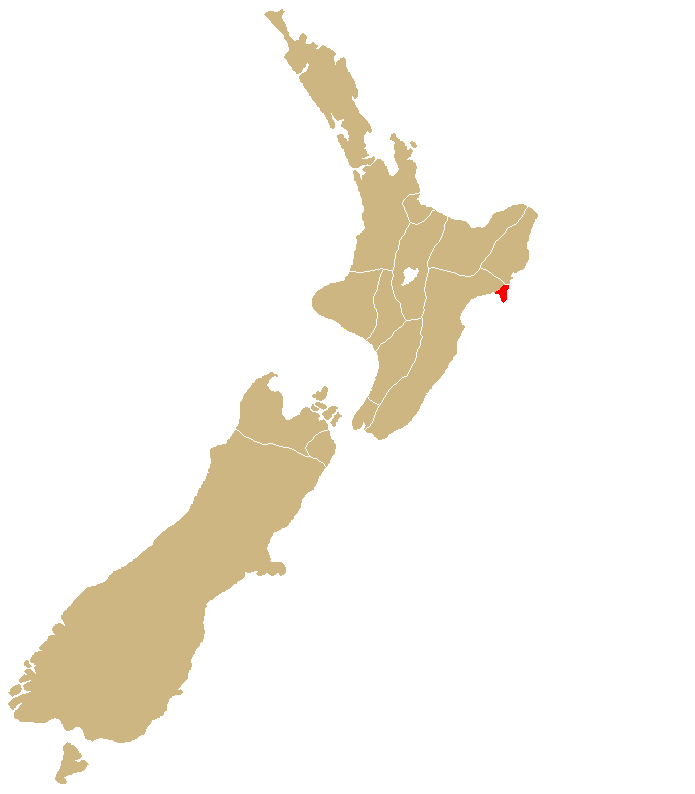
- Rohe (region): Māhia Peninsula
- Waka (canoe): Kurahaupō, Tākitimu
- Population: 4,473 (c. 2013)
- Website: http://rongomaiwahine.iwi.nz/

Ngāti Rongomaiwahine or Rongomaiwahine is a Māori iwi (tribe) traditionally centred in the Māhia Peninsula on the North Island of New Zealand. In the 2006 census, 4,254 people identified as Rongomaiwahine; by the 2013 census, this has increased to 4,473 people. It is closely connected to the Ngāti Kahungunu iwi.

The people of Rongomaiwahine are descended from a common ancestor, Rongomaiwahine. She was descended from Ruawharo, the tohunga (navigator) of the Tākitimu waka (Māori migration canoe), and Popoto, the commander of the Kurahaupō waka.

In Māori tradition, Rongomaiwahine was known to have had two husbands: Tamatakutai and Kahungunu. With Tamatakutai, she bore two daughters, Rapuaiterangi and Hinerauiri. With Kahungunu (well known as the eponymous ancestor of Ngāti Kahungunu) she had five children: Kahukuranui, Rongomaipapa, Tamateakota, Mahakinui and Tauheikuri.

Historically, Rongomaiwahine have operated successful whaling stations. Today, fishing remains an important industry, along with the operation of sheep and cattle stations. Rongomaiwahine Iwi Trust (RIT) is the administrative body of the iwi.

== Marae and wharenui ==
=== Peninsula marae ===
Te Atihau was the tribe's traditional marae (meeting ground). The ground is now part of farming station of designated Māori freehold land which Rocket Lab uses to launch satellites.

The iwi is also associated with three other marae and wharenui (meeting houses) on the peninsula:

- Kaiuku (Oku-ra-renga) marae and Kiwi wharenui, Mahia East Coast Road
- Tuahuru marae and Hine te Rongo wharenui, Mahia East Coast Road
- Te Apaapa-a-Rangi Marae, Nukutaurua Road

=== Inland marae ===
The iwi is associated with four marae and wharenui north of the peninsula:

- Māhanga (Rongomaiwahine) marae and Te Poho o Rongomaiwahine wharenui on Mahanga Road
- Ruawharo marae and wharenui on Opoutama Road
- Tāne-nui-a-Rangi marae and wharenui on State Highway 2 in Nūhaka
- Te Rākatō marae on Kaiwaitau Road

== See also ==
- List of Māori iwi
