= Riria Smith =

New Zealand Māori weaver

- Born: 23 July 1935; New Zealand
- Died: 28 November 2012 (aged 77)
- Known for: Weaving

Riria Smith (23 July 1935 – 28 November 2012) was a master in traditional Māori weaving from Northland in New Zealand. She was affiliated to the iwi Ngāti Kurī and the hapū Pohutiare of Te Aupōuri.

== Biography ==
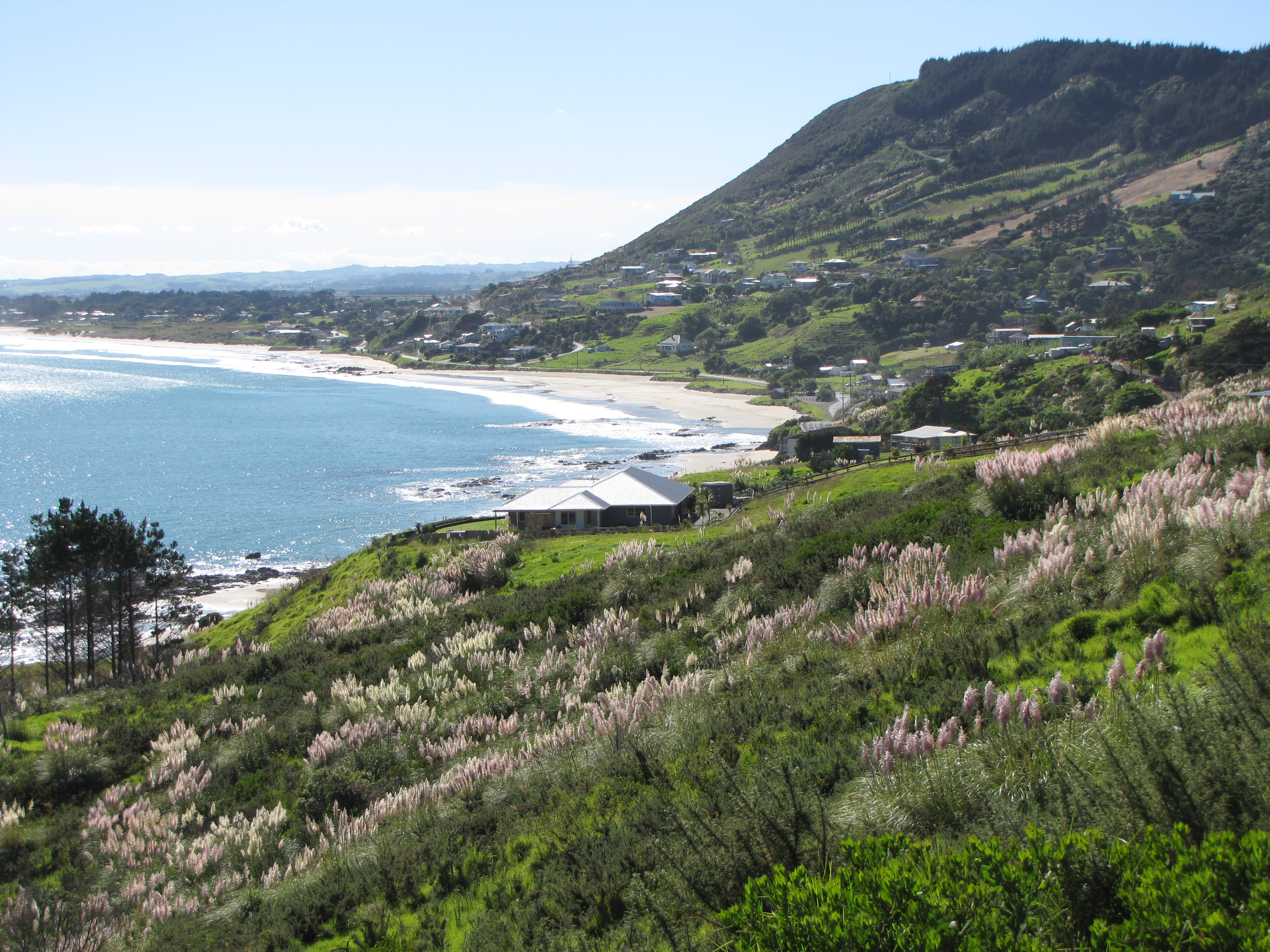
Ahipara Bay

Smith was born in 1935. She lived in Ahipara near Ninety Mile Beach in the north of New Zealand. Smith learnt from her parents and grandparents generations the art of weaving, including collecting and caring for the plants and natural dyes used in traditional Māori textiles. Her mother was a renowned weaver although Smith was the only one of her ten siblings to follow on with it.

Smith was one of eight weavers to be featured in the first international exhibition of contemporary weaving called Amokura o te Maori. Smith's work was exhibited alongside Nora Pikia, Te Aue Davis, Puti Hineaupounamu Rare, Diggeress Te Kanawa, Florrie Berghan, Emily Schuster and Eddie Maxwell. It opened in London and then toured Europe.

Smith has works in the collection of Museum of New Zealand Te Papa Tongarewa, as well as in many marae her region of Northland. One of the items at Te Papa is a sail for a waka. A group of Northland weavers studied the only existing historic sail woven by Māori, held in the British Museum, and then went about recreating what they had studied.

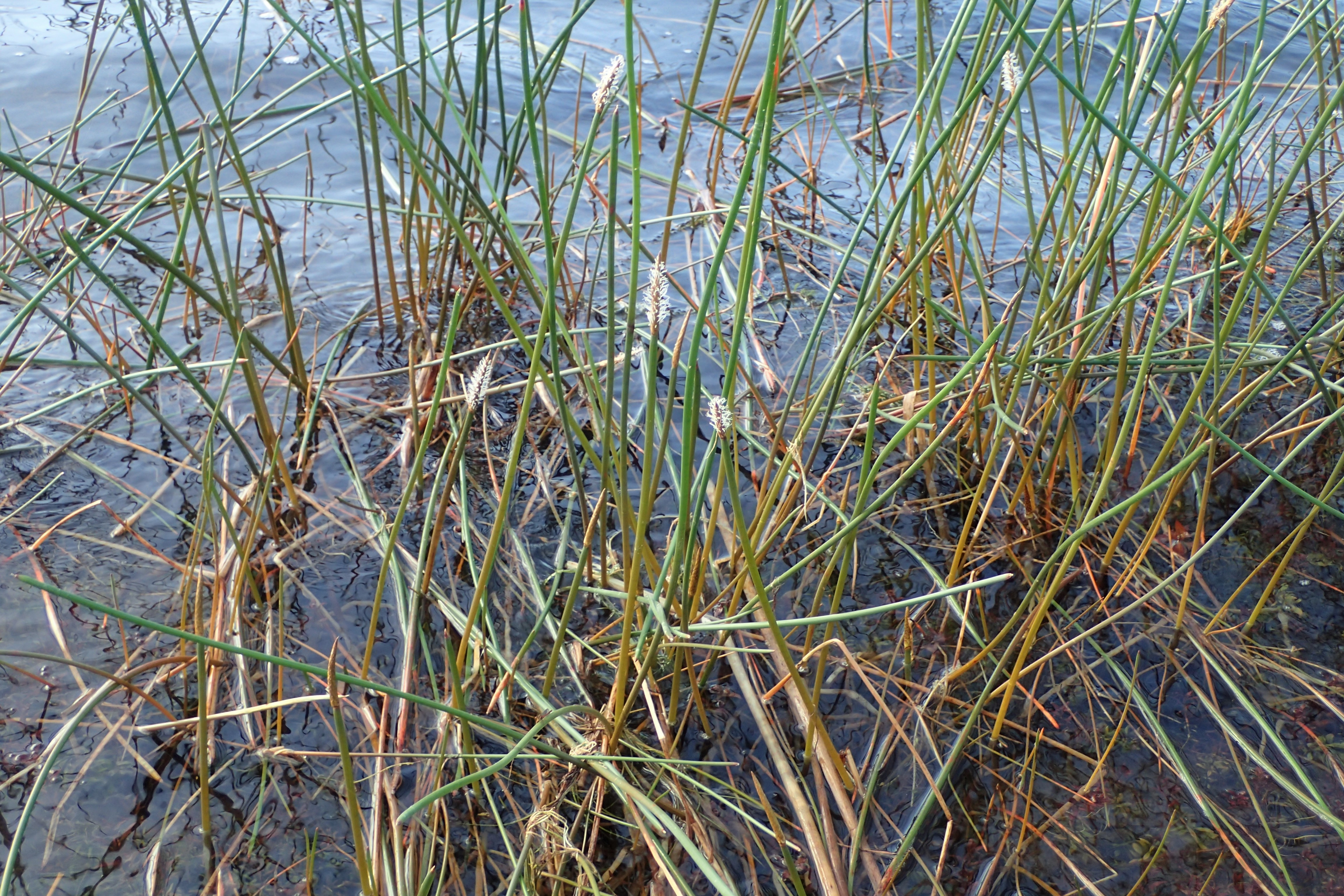
Kuta or sedge growing in shallow freshwater

Smith's weaving technique tended towards patterning with undyed fibres, using a planned holes (kupenga) and reverse leaf approach. Examples of her work are used by Manaaki Whenua – Landcare Research (a New Zealand government research institution) to illustrate the weaving use of the New Zealand plant kuta or sedge (Eleocharis sphacelata).

She was appointed a member of the group Kahui Whiritoi. This group is a formal acknowledgement of master weavers in Aotearoa and is decided by New Zealand Māori Arts and Crafts Institute and the management committee of Te Roopu Raranga Whatu.

She died after a long illness in 2012. Her tangi (funeral) was held at Te Ohaaki Marae in Ahipara.
