= Ngāi Takoto =

Māori iwi (tribe) in Aotearoa New Zealand

- Iwi (tribe) in Māoridom
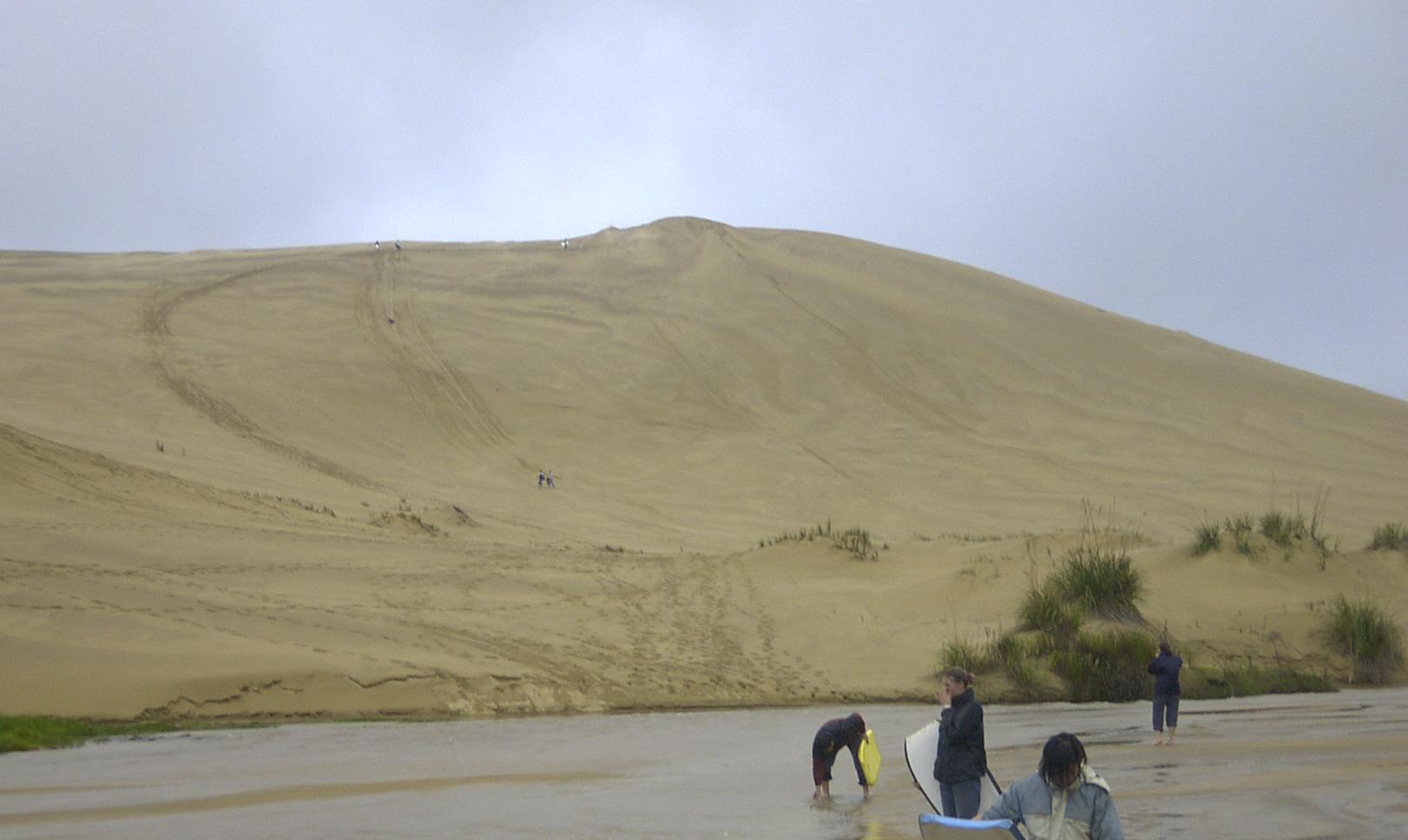
- Ninety Mile Beach

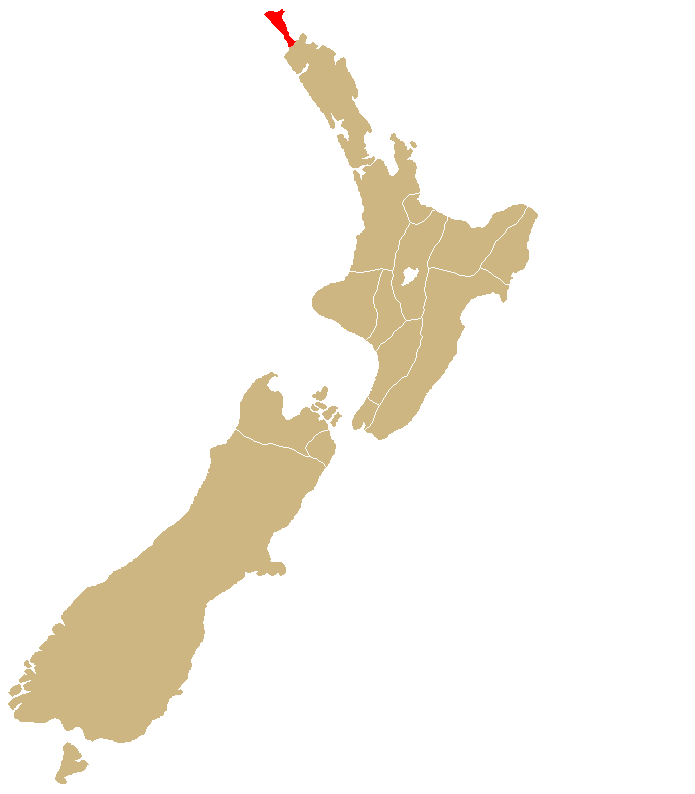
- Rohe (region): Northland
- Waka (canoe): Kurahaupō
- Population: 1,113
- Website: www.ngaitakotoiwi.co.nz

Ngāi Takoto is a Māori iwi from Northland, New Zealand. The iwi is one of the six Muriwhenua iwi of the far north of the North Island. Ngāi Takoto trace their whakapapa (ancestry) back to Tuwhakatere, and trace their arrival in New Zealand to the Kurahaupo waka (canoe). The rohe (tribal area) of the iwi is focused on the upper North Island and extends to Kermadec Islands, Three Kings Island, Cape Reinga, Pao Island, Ninety Mile Beach, Waimimiha River, Ohaku hills, Whangatane River, Rangaunu Harbour and North Cape.

In the 2013 New Zealand census, 1,113 people affiliated with Ngāi Takoto, less than 1 percent of the total Māori population. 18.3 percent identified solely with the iwi and 81.5 percent also affiliated with other iwi. 33.2 percent of people could hold a conversation about everyday things in te reo Māori (the Māori language). The median age was 28.5 years, compared to the national median of 38.0. The median adult income was $23,800, compared to the national median of $28,500. The unemployment rate was 12.8%, compared to 7.1% nationwide.

The iwi signed a Treaty of Waitangi settlement with the Crown in 2012, after being with almost no land following colonisation. The settlement included commercial redress of $21.04 million, and the return of Wharemaru East Beach and other culturally important sites. The iwi agreed to co-govern Ninety Mile Beach with Northland Regional Council, Far North District Council and other Te Hiku iwi, and to be involved in conservation decisions about public lands through the Korowai for Enhanced Conservation organisation. Under the settlement, the Crown and the iwi agreed to work together on a social development strategy.

== Marae ==
The following marae (meeting places) and wharenui (meeting houses) are affiliated with the iwi as a whole:

- Kaimaumau, No wharenui, Kaimaumau
- Mahimaru, Te Whakamomoringa, Awanui
- Te Pā a Parore, Te Pā A Parore, Awanui
- Waimanoni, Wikitoria, Awanui

== Governance ==
Te Runanga o Ngāi Takoto is the iwi's post-Treaty settlement governance entity and is the iwi authority under planning law. It has five representatives chosen from the Ngāi Takoto marae committee, and is based in Kaitaia.

Ngā Taonga o Ngaitakoto Trust is the mandated iwi fisheries organisation. It was set up under the Māori Fisheries Act to manage the iwi's customary fisheries rights, has 11 trustees from iwi whānui, and is based in Awanui.

The iwi has interests in the territory of Far North District Council. It therefore has interests in the territory of Northland Regional Council.

== Population ==
As of 2013, 51.3% of iwi members lived in urban areas, compared to 65.6% of the total Māori population. 94.3% of iwi members lived in the North Island and 5.9% or 66 people lived in the South Island. Most members lived in the Northland Region (44.5%), the Auckland Region (33.2%) and Waikato Region (5.4%). 30.5% were under the age of 15 years, compared with 33.1% of the total population of Māori descent. 22.1% were aged 15–29 years, 41.0% were aged 30 to 64 years, and 6.7& were aged 65 and over. 45.0% of the population was male and 55.3% was female.

As of the same date, 74.1% of iwi members held a formal qualification, up from 71.7% in 2006, and compared to 68.7 in 2013 for Māori overall. Women were more likely than men to have a formal qualification, with 78.5% women being qualified compared to 67.7% of men. The unemployment rate was 12.2% for women, 12.2% for men and 27.0% for people aged 15 to 24 years old. 30.2 percent of women and 15.4 percent of men worked part time. The most common job for men was labourer, and the most common job for women was labourer. The median income was $27,500 for men and $22,400 for women.

The 2013 Census found 74.6% of the iwi lived in homes with Internet access, 88.6% lived in homes with access to mobile phones, and 1.4% lived in homes with no access to phones, cellphones, fax machines or the Internet. The Census also found 94.1% of the population were living in a household with access to a motor vehicle. That compares with 90.9% of Māori as a whole and 91.9% of the iwi in the previous Census in 2006.

== Media ==
Te Reo Irirangi o Te Hiku o Te Ika, an iwi radio station, serves Ngāi Takoto and other Muriwhenua tribes of the Far North. It broadcasts a main station on 97.1 FM, an urban contemporary station Sunshine FM on 104.3 FM and a youth-oriented station Tai FM.

== Notable people ==
- Anahera Herbert-Graves, Māori leader
- Shane Jones, politician and diplomat

== See also ==
- List of Māori iwi
