= Anahera Herbert-Graves =

Anahera Herbert-Graves (born 12 June 1956) was the Chief Executive Officer of Te Runanga-a-Iwi o Ngāti Kahu from July 2006 to December 2021, the tribal parliament of the New Zealand Māori tribe Ngāti Kahu.

Born in Auckland, Ānahera is a member of all the iwi of Te Hiku o Te Ika; i.e. (Te Rarawa, Ngāti Kurī, Te Aupōuri, Ngāi Takoto and Ngāti Kahu) as well as a descendant of Nga Tai Umupuia, a hapū of Tainui).

The other hapū with which Ānahera identifies through her whakapapa (genealogy) are, Te Uri o Tai and Ngati Torotoroa of Te Rarawa, as well as Patu Kōraha of Ngāti Kahu.

In 1957, Ānahera's parents returned to their birthplace, the north Hokianga community of Pawarenga, where they raised their seven children on the family dairy farm.

Ānahera was educated at Rotokakahi Māori Maori School, Broadwood Broadwood District High, and Epsom Girls' Grammar School.

She has worked in a wide range of public, private and voluntary sector jobs and has held a number of key leadership positions throughout Northland and Auckland.

Ānahera contributed to the book Ngāti Kahu: Portrait of a Sovereign Nation with Margaret Mutu, Lloyd Pōpata, Te Kani Williams, Reremoana Rēnata, JudyAnn Cooze, Zarrah Pineaha, Tania Thomas, and Te Ikanui Kingi-Waiaua, published by Huia Publishers in 2018.

Anahera now lives in semi-retirement in Pawarenga where she continues to manage the Waitangi Tribunal land claims of Ngati Kahu as well as their communications.

She and her family are Latter-day Saints, and she has been very critical of the church's handling of sex abuse cases.
