= Ngāti Kurī =

Māori iwi (tribe) in New Zealand

- Iwi (tribe) in Māoridom
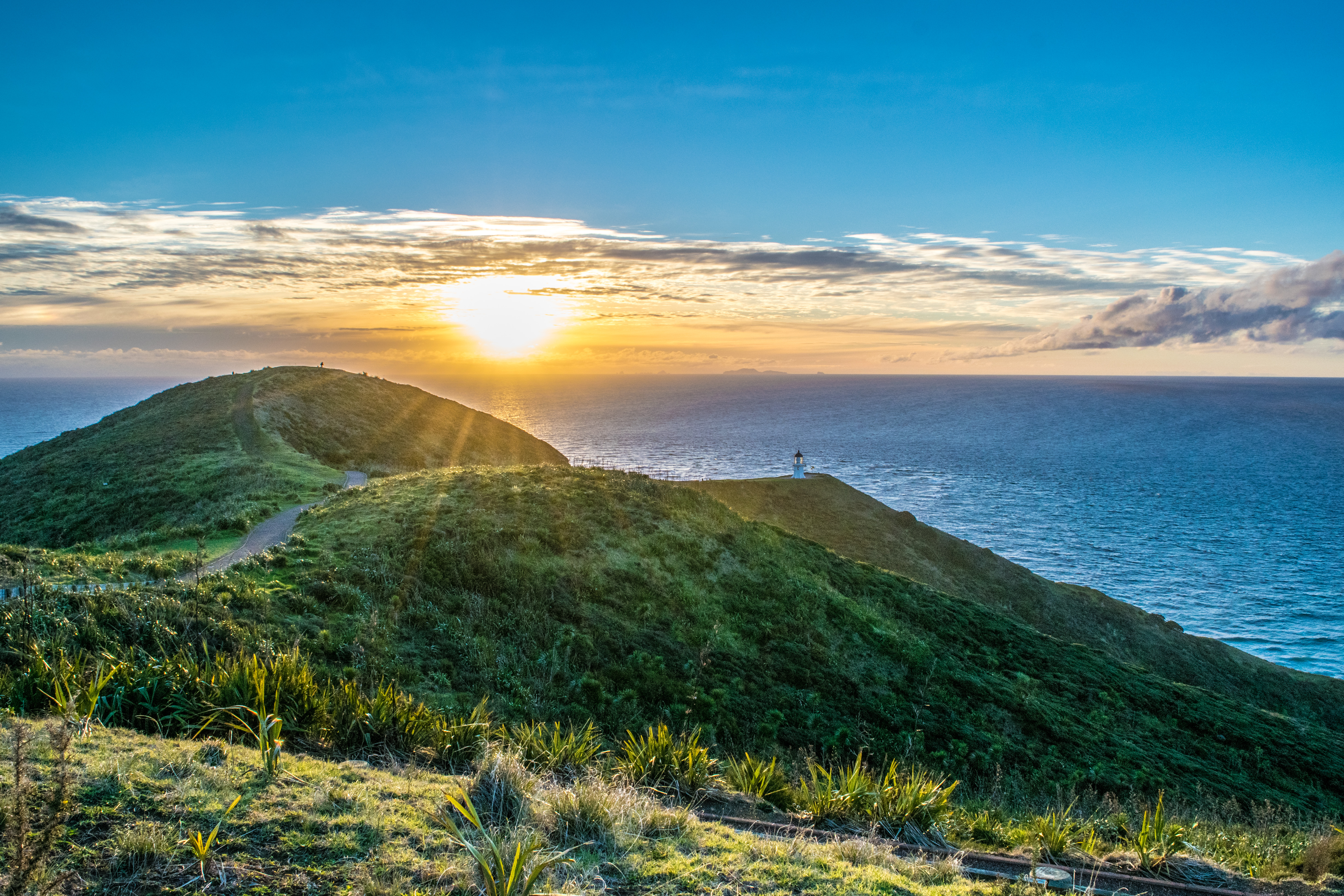
- Cape Reinga / Te Rerenga Wairua
- Rohe (region): Northland
- Waka (canoe): Kurahaupō
- Population: 6,492
- Website: www.ngatikuri.iwi.nz

Ngāti Kurī is a Māori iwi from Northland, New Zealand. The iwi is one of the five Muriwhenua iwi of the far north of the North Island. Ngāti Kurī trace their whakapapa (ancestry) back to Pōhurihanga, the captain of the waka (canoe) Kurahaupō. Kurī, in Māori, means "dog". The rohe (tribal area) of the iwi is focused on the most northern tip of the North Island and includes the Kermadec Islands, Manawatāwhi / Three Kings Islands, Cape Reinga / Te Rerenga Wairua, Ninety Mile Beach, Parengarenga Harbour, Te Kao and Houhora.

As of 2013, 6,492 people are affiliated with the iwi, less than 1% of the Māori population. The iwi is 46.9% male and 53.1% female, and the median age is 24.1 years. Of the total iwi population, 25.6% do not identify with any other iwi, and 28.5% can hold a conversation in the Māori language. Of the total population 15 years and over, 43.3% have never been a regular smoker, and 67.3% hold a formal qualification. The median income is $22,200 and 67.0% living in cities are employed.

Ngāti Kuri signed a Deed of Settlement, under the Treaty of Waitangi resettlement process, on 7 February 2014 at Waiora Marae in Ngataki. The iwi signed four Deeds to Amend later that year. The 25 year settlement process began in 1987, under the leadership of Matiu Rata, and iwi members had mixed feelings about the settlement. Ngāti Kuri members from Te Hāpua held a protest at the signing to express their opposition to the agreement. The settlement included $21 million in financial and commercial redress, and cultural redress providing recognition of the traditional, historical, cultural and spiritual associations of Ngāti Kuri with several key sites. The iwi also received a cultural and history endowment fund of $2.23 million.

== Hapū and marae ==
There are hapū (sub-tribes) associated with the iwi (tribe).

The following marae (meeting places) and wharenui (meeting houses) are affiliated with the iwi as a whole:

- Te Reo Mihi, Te Hāpua
- Waiora, Ngataki

== Organisations ==
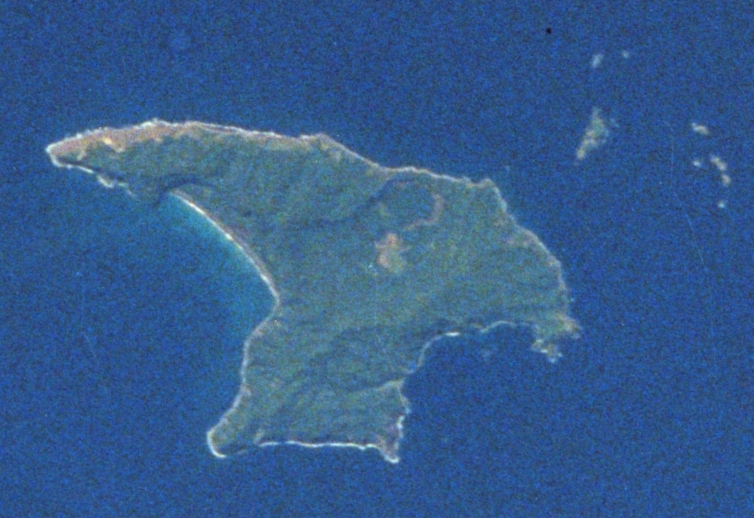
Raoul Island, in the Kermadec Islands, is part of the Ngāti Kurī rohe (territory).

The Ngāti Kurī Trust Board is the post-Treaty of Waitangi settlement iwi affiliated with the iwi through the Ngāi Kurí Claims Settlement Act 2015. It is a mandated iwi organisation under the Māori Fisheries Act 2004, and an Iwi Aquaculture Organisation under the Māori Commercial Aquaculture Claims Settlement Act 2004. The trust represents Ngāti Kurī as an "iwi authority" for resource consent applications under the Resource Management Act 1991 and is a Tūhono organisation and incorporated society. The trust is made up of three people from the iwi, three people from the Muriwhenua iwi group, and five iwi members who live outside the iwi area. As of 2015, the trust was based in Ngataki and chaired by Harry Burkhardt.

Te Reo Irirangi o Te Hiku o Te Ika, an iwi radio station, serves Ngāti Kurī and other Muriwhenua tribes of the Far North. It broadcasts a main station on 97.1 FM, an urban contemporary station Sunshine FM on 104.3 FM and a youth-oriented station Tai FM.

The iwi has interests in the territory of Far North District Council. It therefore has interests in the territory of Northland Regional Council.

== Population ==
As of the 2013 New Zealand census, 61.1% of the population live in cities with populations of 30,000 and larger, compared to 65.6 of the Māori population overall. The Census showed 94.% of the iwi lived in the North Island and 5.8 percent lived in the South. 33.9 percent are under the age of 15 years, 22.4 percent are aged 15–29 years, and 5.4 percent are aged 65 years and over. Iwi members most commonly live in the Auckland Region (42.8%), Northland Region (31.4%) or Waikato Region (7.9%). For women 15 and over, 30.2% had never given birth, 13.6% had given birth to one child, 32.8% had given birth to two or three children, and 23.4% had given birth to four or more children.

67.3% of the iwi population hold a formal qualification, 10.2% have a bachelor's degree or higher as their highest qualification. 32.8 percent have no formal qualification. The qualification rate for women (71.5%) is higher than the qualification rate for men (61.7%). However, the unemployment rate for women (19.4%) is higher than the unemployment rate for men (15.5%). 78.8 percent work full-time, 86.2 percent are paid employees, 10.4 percent are employers or self-employed, and 3.3 percent are unpaid family workers. The most common job for men is labourer and the most common job for women is professional.

Of women 15 and older, 30.2% have never given birth, 13.6% have given birth to one child, 32.8% have given birth to two or three children, and 23.4% have given birth to four or more children. The average number of children born is 2.1. 78.1% live in family households, 12.9% live in multi-family households, 4.7% live in one-person homes and 4.3% live in flats. 53.8% of people live in couples with children, 33.5% live in a one-parent family, and 12.7 live in couples without children. There are 2,460 dependent children in the iwi as of 2013.

== Notable Ngāti Kurī ==
- Bethany Edmunds
- Hinemoa Elder
- Percy Erceg
- Merimeri Penfold
- Matiu Rata
- Dover Samuels
- Don Selwyn
- Riria Smith
- Miraka Szászy

== See also ==
- List of Māori iwi
