= Muaūpoko =

Māori iwi (tribe) in Aotearoa New Zealand

- Iwi (tribe) in Māoridom
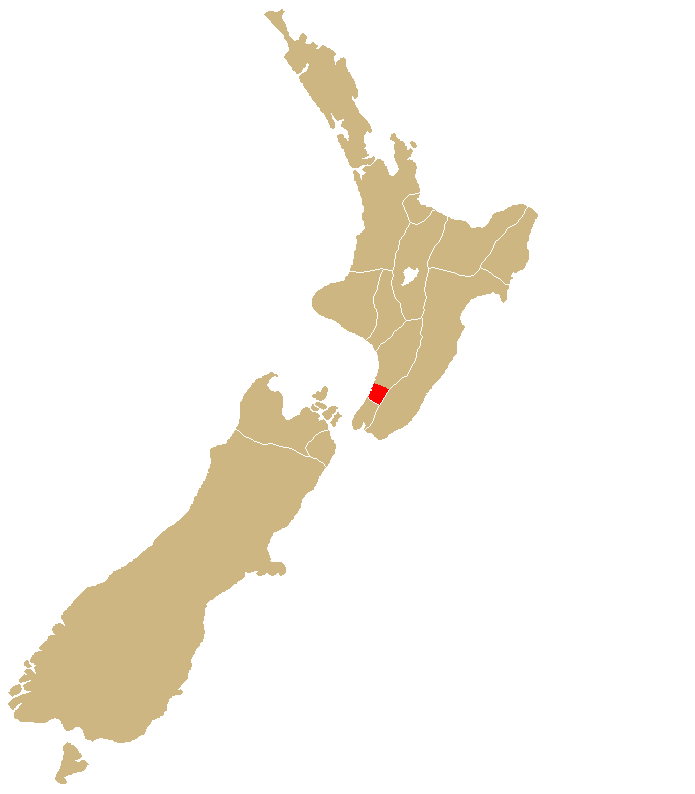
- Rohe (region): Kāpiti Coast
- Waka (canoe): Kurahaupō
- Population: 2,499

Muaūpoko is a Māori iwi on the Kāpiti Coast of New Zealand.

Muaūpoko are descended from the ancestor Tara, whose name has been given to many New Zealand landmarks, most notably Te Whanganui-a-Tara (Wellington). His people were known as Ngāi Tara, although more recently they took the name Muaūpoko, meaning the people living at the head (ūpoko) of the fish of Māui (that is, the southernmost end of the North Island.)

Muaūpoko's traditional area is in the Horowhenua/Kāpiti Coast/Wellington region. In the early nineteenth century Ngāi Tara were a large iwi occupying the area between the Tararua Ranges in the east and the Tasman Sea in the west, from Sinclair Head in the south to the Rangitīkei River in the north. Some hapū had even settled in Queen Charlotte Sound in the 17th century.

== History ==
According to the Horowhenua Commission of 1896, which inquired into the Lake Horowhenua domain, the Muaūpoko were defeated after violent conflict with Ngāti Toa and Ngāti Raukawa from the north, and were almost exterminated. They were driven into "the fastnesses of the hills", or forced to take refuge with the Whanganui and other tribes. In the 2012 New Zealand High Court case of Taueki v Police, concerning a protest at Lake Horowhenua, Justice Kós stated that the "scars of that battle remain livid today."

== See also ==
- List of Māori iwi
