= Kurahaupō =

Māori migration canoe

- Great Māori migration waka
- Commander: Ruatea; Te Moungaroa; Popoto; Po Hurihanga; Taratoa; Whatonga
- Priest: Te Moungaroa
- Landed at: Kermadecs or Takapaukura near North Cape.
- Iwi: Taranaki Tūturu; Ngāti Apa; Ngāi Takoto; Ngāti Kurī; Ngāti Kahungunu; Ngāti Rongomaiwahine; Ngāti Kuia; Rangitāne; Te Aupōuri; Te Rarawa; Muaūpoko; Te Ati-haunui-a-Pāpārangi; Ngāi Tara; Ngāti Apa ki te Rā Tō; Ngāti Haupoto; Kāti Mamoe; Ngāti Tūmatakōkiri
- Settled at: Muriwhenua; Taranaki; Mahia; Wairarapa; Te Whanganui-a-Tara; Rangitikei; Whanganui; Te Wai Pounamu

Kurahaupō was one of the great ocean-going, voyaging canoes that was used in the migrations that settled New Zealand in Māori tradition.

In Taranaki tribal tradition, Kurahaupō is known as Te Waka Pakaru ki te moana or 'The Canoe broken at sea', and was reputed to have arrived to New Zealand in the same generation as the other great migration vessels of the Māori (although unlikely to have arrived at the same time) like Aotea, Mātaatua, Tākitimu, Tainui, Arawa etc. This proverb, or whakataukī describes how the waka suffered multiple accidents and why the tribal traditions of other descendant groups all differ. There are multiple accounts of the voyage of the waka, and the people who sailed in it, that differ widely depending on which area the tradition originates from. While all are correct, this divergent discourse has contributed to various theories printed on this waka by Percy Smith and company, and subsequently republished and referenced through generations of scholars. This includes the theory that there were two vessels named Kurahaupō. In fact, there was probably only one vessel, but it carried different names and changed captains several times.

While Hawaiki is commonly referred to as the island home from which Kurahaupō sailed, it is unknown exactly which island this was. Moreover, it is probable that the crew was made up of groups from different islands and different families. This is apparent in the settlement pattern around New Zealand. Some oral traditions have the Kurahaupō making repairs on the island of Atiu where the ancestor Taratoa is said to have been a captain of the waka. The Kurahaupō was known to have set sail from Rarotonga and made landfall in the Kermadec Islands, at Raoul Island. It was here that the waka suffered a mishap as it was damaged and began to sink. Several of the crew abandoned ship and were taken aboard the Aotea and Mataatua. The waka was repaired by Po Hurihanga and his people, who then sailed it to New Zealand and made landfall at Te Wakura in Te Hiku o te Ika where it had another accident. It was then repaired and sailed down the east coast of the North Island till it reached Nukutaurua on Te Māhia Peninsula.

There are many people who were said to have been the captains of the waka, and all were probably captains at one point or another. This is also dependent on which tribe the tradition is sourced from as well. Nonetheless, many modern iwi in New Zealand claim descent from the vessel, and there are many aristocratic genealogies that connect to people from the vessel. Some key people on board the waka included:

- Te Moungaroa, Te Hatauira, Tamaahua, Akura-matapu and others who settled in Taranaki.
- Ruatea settled in the Rangitikei region and was reputed to have been the eponymous ancestor of Ngāti Apa.
- Po Hurihanga and his people settled in Muriwhenua (named after his daughter by Maieke) and all the Muriwhenua tribes can claim descent from him.
- Whatonga was the ancestor of Rangitāne, Ngāi Tara and Muaūpoko.
- Popoto was the ancestor of Ngāti Rongomaiwahine.

There are multiple versions of the voyage and settlement of the crew of the waka; the story changes depending on which tribal region one is in. All stories have validity.

== See also ==
- List of Māori waka

== Bibliography ==
- Karerehe, Te Kahu (1896). "The Kurahoupo Canoe". Journal of the Polynesian Society. 2 (3): 186–191.
- Smith, S. Percy (1910). History and Traditions of the Maoris of the West Coast, North Island of New Zealand: Prior to 1840. Polynesian Society.
- Broughton, Ruka (1979). Ko Ngaa Paiaka o Ngaa Rauru Kitahi. Wellington, New Zealand: Masters thesis, Victoria University.
- Broughton, Raka (1983). The origins of Ngaa Rauru Kiitahi (English translation). Department of Maori Affairs.)
