= Muriwhenua =

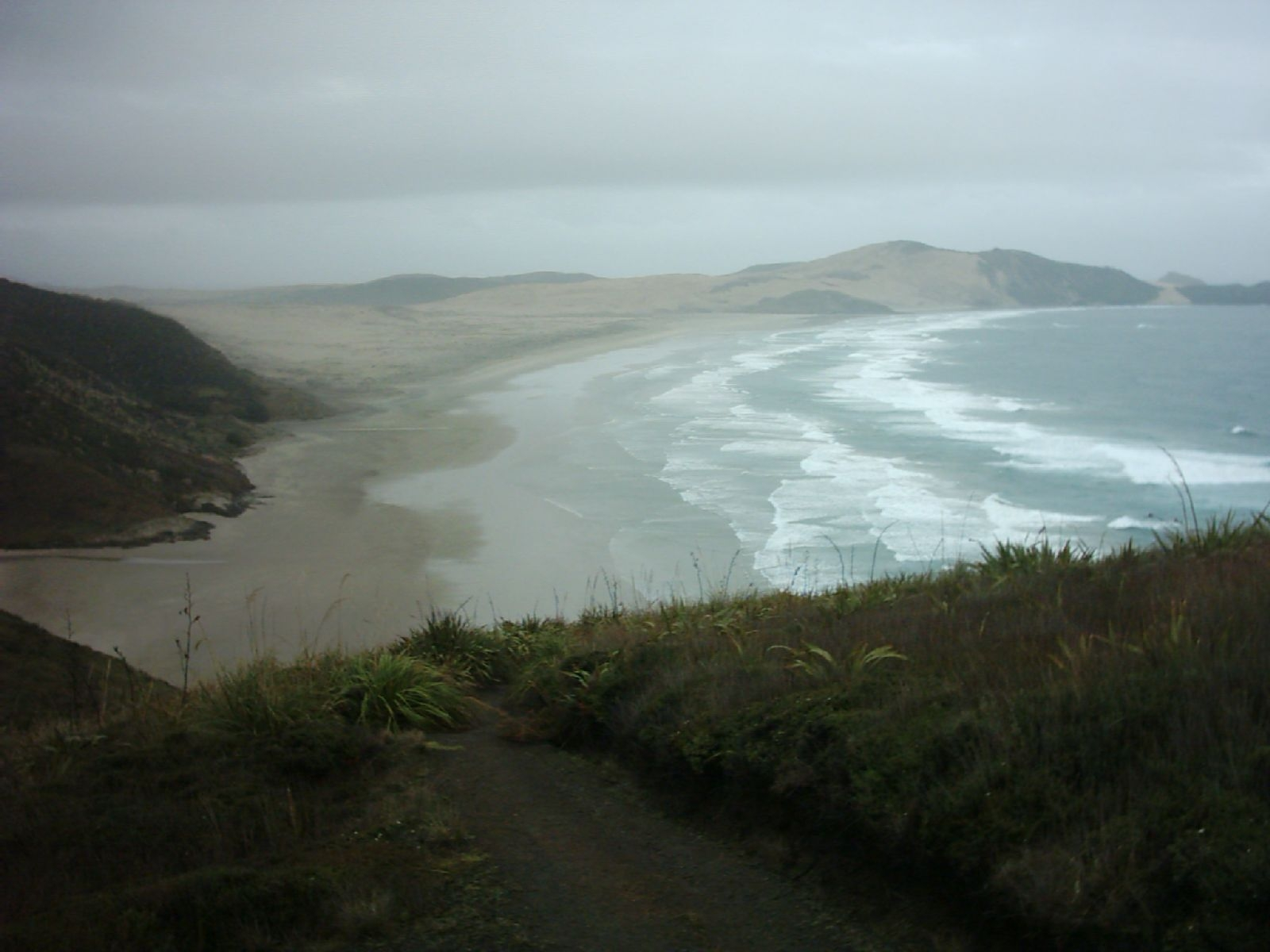
- Cape Reinga, Far North, in the rohe (tribal area) of the Muriwhenua people.

Regions with significant populations
- Northland, New Zealand

Languages
- Māori language

Muriwhenua are a group of northern Māori iwi, based in Te Hiku o te Ika, the northernmost part of New Zealand's North Island. It consists of six iwi, Ngāti Kurī, Ngāi Takoto, Te Pātū, Ngāti Kahu, Te Aupōuri and Te Rarawa, with a combined population of about 34,000 people. The spiritually significant Hokianga Harbour, located just to the south of the Maungataniwha Range, is of special significance to the Muriwhenua people.

The name Muriwhenua means "end of the land", describing the rohe (traditional tribal lands) of the iwi, extending up the North Auckland Peninsula from the Maungataniwha Range to Cape Reinga. The name Te Hiku o te Ika translates as the tail of the fish, meaning the end of the North Island, which in Māori mythology is the fish Māui caught (known as Te-Ika-a-Māui, or literally The Fish of Māui. Elders sometimes say the head of the fish is the New Zealand capital city of Wellington, but it can only go where the tail will allow.

== History ==
=== Early history ===
According to Muriwhenua tradition, the great waka navigator Kupe discovered the region, mistaking Houhora mountain, north of Kaitaia, for a whale. The crew of his waka explored from Cape Reinga to Parengarenga Harbour, including Karikari Peninsula, Tokerau Beach, Whangaroa Harbour and Matauri Bay. According to one tradition, he followed a current to Hakarara mountain in Matauri Bay. According to another, he landed in Hokianga Harbour, and on his return to Hawaiki, created waves which reached the coast of Ninety Mile Beach.

The chief Tūmatahina is credited with helping the Muriwhenua people escape a besieged village as they were running out of food. He instructed his people to place dummy warriors, made out of bulrushes, around the pallisades of their pā (fortification), fix a long flax rope to a rock on the mainland, and use it to escape. Tūmatahina followed at the rear of the group, and used his large footprints to hide the footprints of the other people, concealing the escape from the enemy. The kūaka (bar-tailed godwit) is the symbol of the tribes; their annual migration from the Muriwhenua harbours represents the successful escape.

Later, the Whangape chief Ueoneone travelled to Waikato, where he fell in love with the sisters Reitū and Reipae and proposed to marry them. On her way north, Reipae fell in love with a chief named Ōtāhuhupōtiki and married him; their harbour became Te Whanga-a-Reipae (the harbour of Reipae), which was shortened to Whangārei. Reitū married Ueoneone at Whangape; their twin daughters Kauae and Tawakeiti married Tūpoto, a common ancestor of all Northland tribes.

=== Colonisation ===
In 1840, 61 chiefs from Muriwhenua signed the Māori language version of the Treaty of Waitangi, in the hopes it would protect their lands from colonisation. However, the Muriwhenua people lost vast areas of land to settlers or the government. A report into Muriwhenua fisheries rights in 1988 led to the passing of the Māori Fisheries Act in 1992. Since 1994, the tribes have settled land claims with the New Zealand Government through the Waitangi Tribunal.

=== Communications ===
Te Reo Irirangi o Te Hiku o Te Ika, an iwi radio station, serves the Muriwhenua tribes. It broadcasts a main station on 97.1 FM, an urban contemporary station Sunshine FM on 104.3 FM and a youth-oriented station Tai FM.

== Notable people ==
- Hone Harawira, activist, politician and community leader
- Hector Busby, navigator and waka builder
- Tina Cross, entertainer
- Whina Cooper, community leader
- Mitch Evans, racing car driver
- Anahera Herbert-Graves, Māori leader
- Ralph Hotere, artist
- Margaret Mutu, academic
- Shane Jones, politician
- Stacey Jones, rugby league player
- Anika Moa, recording artist
- Māmari Stephens, lecturer
- Meri Te Tai Mangakāhia, Māori suffragist
