= Rohe =

Territorial divisions within Māori society

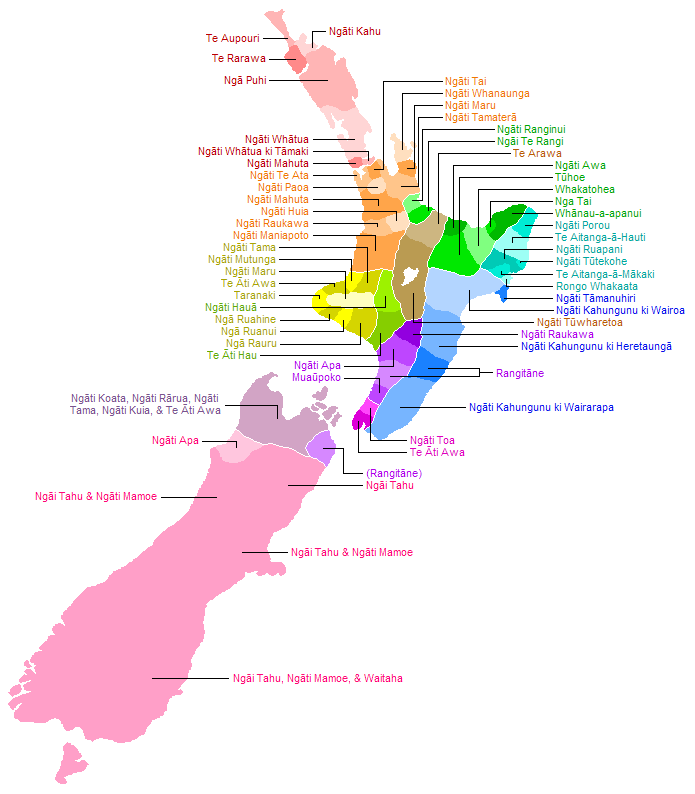
Map of rohe. Areas shown are indicative only, and some rohe may overlap.

The Māori people of New Zealand use the word rohe to describe the territory or boundaries of tribes (iwi), although some divide their rohe into several takiwā.

== Background ==
In 1793, chief Tuki Te Terenui Whare Pirau who had been brought to Norfolk Island drew the first map of the islands of New Zealand at the request of New South Wales Governor Philip King; in which the regions of North Island were only divided by families indicated by their locations: tribes like Muaūpoko living in south of the island bore the mua- ("front") affix whereas northern families like Muriwhenua were affixed muri- ("back") in reference to the island believed to be a large fish caught by Māui.

== See also ==
- List of Māori iwi
