= Radio Active (New Zealand) =

- Wellington, New Zealand; New Zealand
- Broadcast area: Wellington
- Frequency: 88.6 MHz
- Branding: RadioActive.FM

Programming
- Format: alternative

History
- First air date: 1977; 49 years ago
- Former frequencies: 89 MHz

Technical information
- Transmitter coordinates: 41.2739°S 174.764°E

Links
- Webcast: Stream
- Website: www.radioactive.fm

Radio Active is an alternative radio station broadcasting in Wellington, New Zealand. It broadcasts on 88.6FM (formerly 89 FM) as well as streaming online at www.radioactive.fm. It began as the student radio station for Victoria University of Wellington Students' Association (VUWSA) in 1976, broadcasting on the AM frequency with the call sign 2XA. The station was named Radio Active as a protest against the recent visit to Wellington of the American nuclear warship USS Truxton. The station began with only temporary licences to cover specific events such as Student Orientation, and each time it applied for a licence it faced opposition from established stations. Although it began as a student radio station, Radio Active was originally not permitted to broadcast any religious, political, trade union or controversial matter. On 22 February 1982 it became the first radio station in Wellington to commence broadcast on the newly available FM frequency. In August 1992 VUWSA decided that Radio Active could not make any more losses, and sold the station to radioactive ltd in the hope that the station could become financially viable. Radio Active commenced online broadcasting in 1997, being one of the first radio stations in New Zealand to do so. In 1998 Radio Active moved off the campus and downtown because the Student Association needed the space it occupied in the union building.

Today radioactive.fm has a listenership of around 45,000 weekly plus an online audience via its website.
