= Cape Reinga =

Northwesternmost tip of New Zealand

Cape Reinga Te Rerenga Wairua (Māori)
- Cape
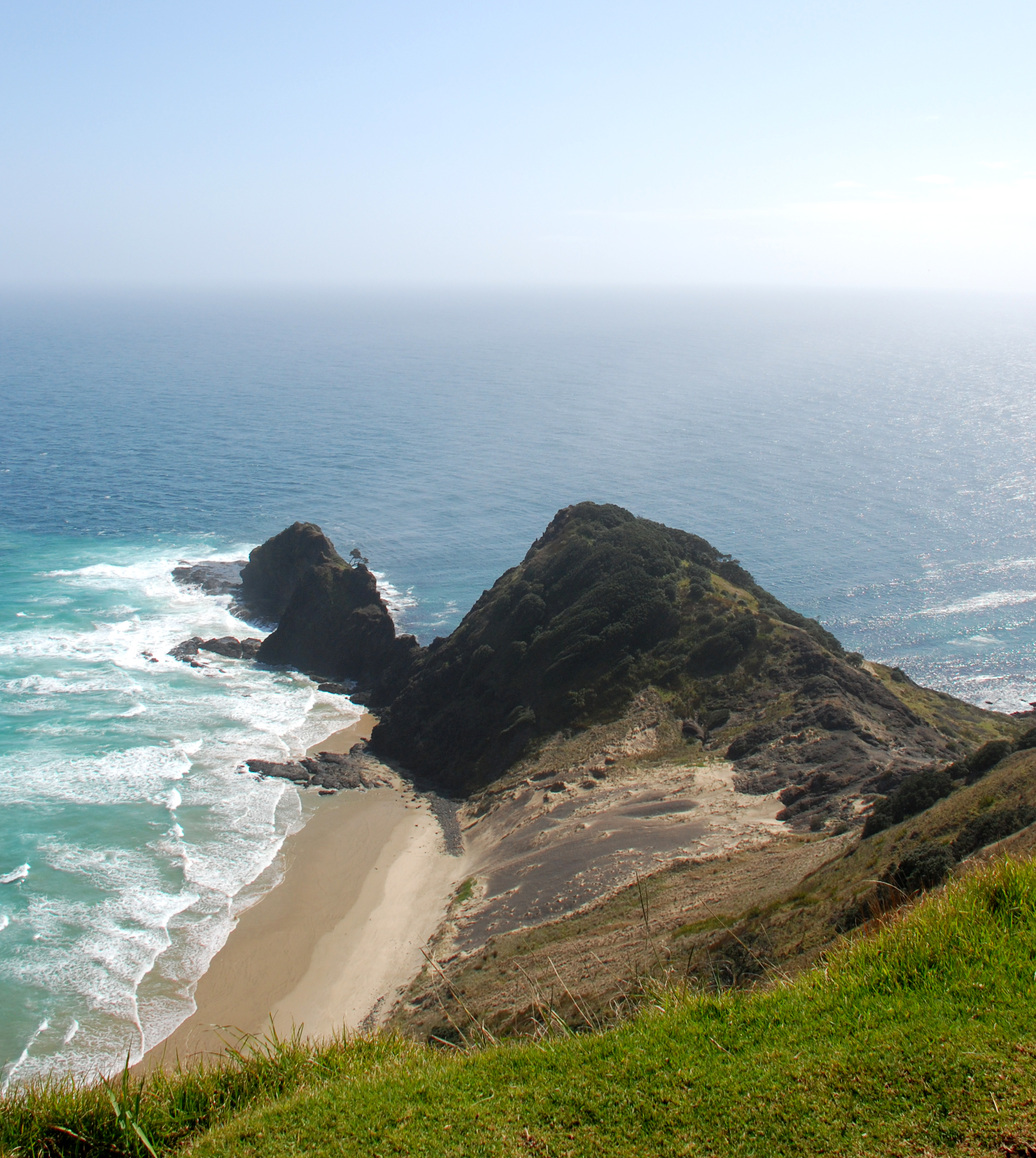

- Location within New Zealand
- Coordinates: 34°25′17″S 172°40′47″E
- Location: Northland, New Zealand
- Water bodies: Tasman Sea

Cape Reinga (Note: (/ˈreɪŋə/; sometimes spelt Rēinga, Māori: Te Rerenga Wairua)), officially Cape Reinga / Te Rerenga Wairua, is the northwestern most tip of the Aupōuri Peninsula, at the northern end of the North Island of New Zealand. Cape Reinga is more than 100 km north of the nearest small town of Kaitaia.

In Māori, Te Rerenga Wairua means the leaping-off place of spirits. Reinga is the Māori word for underworld. Both refer to the Māori belief that the cape is the point where the spirits of the dead enter the underworld.

Cape Reinga is a popular tourist site, with annual visitor numbers estimated at over 500,000 people. Visitor numbers are growing by about five percent a year, and the increase is likely to become even more now that the road to the cape is fully sealed.

== Geography ==
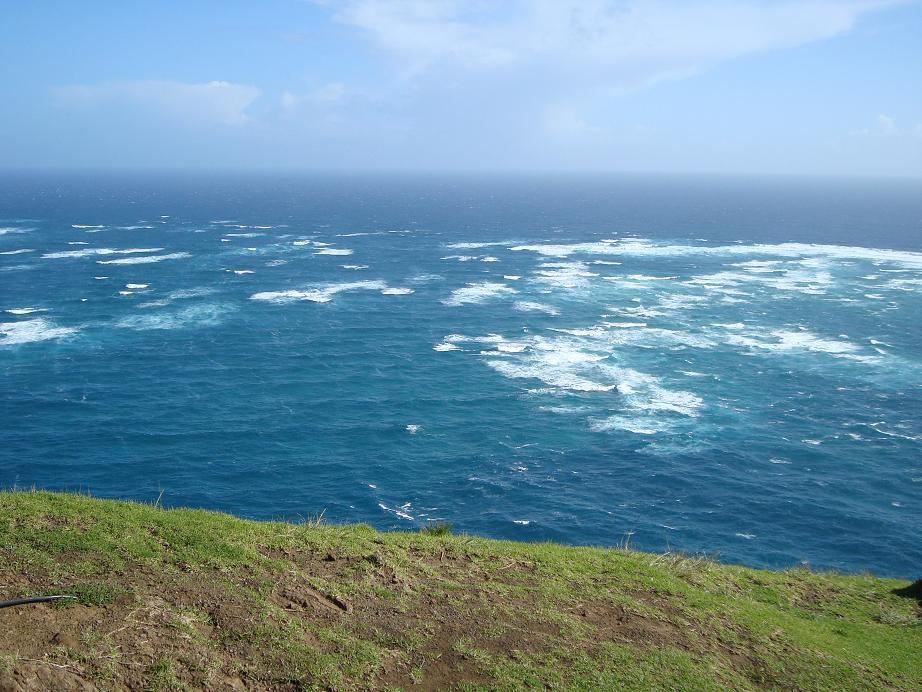
The Tasman Sea (left) meets the Pacific Ocean (right)

Cape Reinga is generally considered the separation marker between the Tasman Sea to the west and the Pacific Ocean to the east. From the lighthouse it is possible to watch the tidal race, as the two seas clash to create unsettled waters just off the coast. Māori refer to this as the meeting of Te Moana-a-Rehua, 'the sea of Rehua' with Te Tai-o-Whitirea, 'the sea of Whitirea', Rehua and Whitirea being a male and a female respectively.

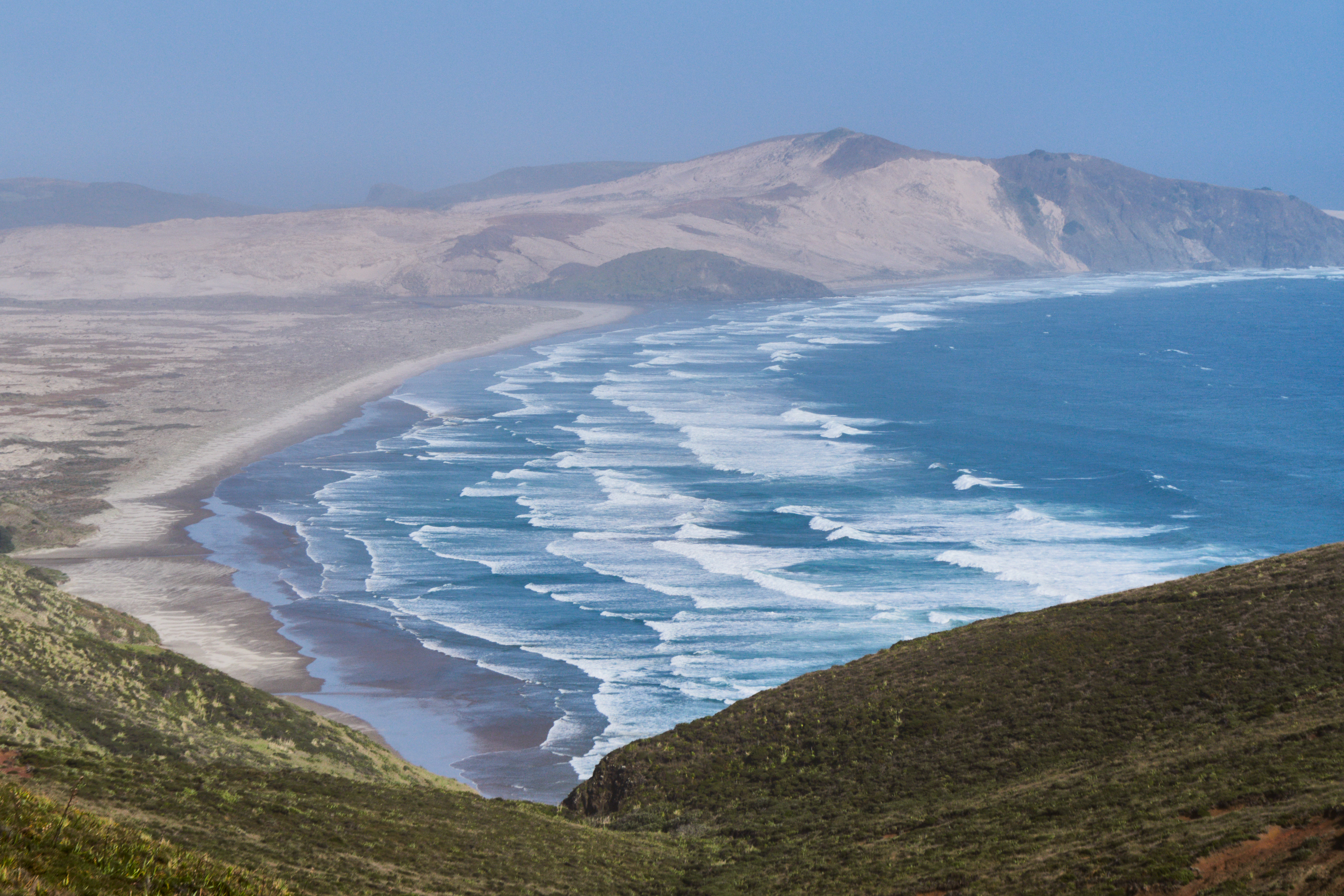
Northern coast off Cape Reinga

The cape is often mistakenly thought of as being the northernmost point of the North Island, and thus, of mainland New Zealand. However, North Cape's Surville Cliffs, 30 km east of Cape Reinga are 3 km further north. Another headland just to the west of Cape Reinga is Cape Maria van Diemen, which was named by the Dutch explorer Abel Tasman during his journey in 1642 and thought of by him to be the northernmost point of the newly discovered country he named 'Staten Landt'.

=== Access ===
Cape Reinga is more than 100 km north of the nearest small town of Kaitaia. State Highway 1 extends all the way to the cape, but until 2010 was unsealed gravel road for the last 19 km. Suitable vehicles can also travel much of the way via Ninety Mile Beach and Kauaeparāoa Stream / Te Paki Stream stream bed.

The cape is also the northern terminus of the Te Araroa hiking trail.

== Māori mythology ==
According to mythology, the spirits of the dead travel to Cape Reinga on their journey to the afterlife to leap off the headland and climb the roots of the 800-year-old pōhutukawa tree and descend to the underworld to return to their traditional homeland of Hawaiki, using the Te Ara Wairua, the 'Spirits' pathway'. At Cape Reinga they depart the mainland. They turn briefly at the Three Kings Islands for one last look back towards the land, then continue on their journey.

A spring in the hillside, Te Waiora-a-Tāne (the 'Living waters of Tāne'), also played an important role in Māori ceremonial burials, representing a spiritual cleansing of the spirits, with water of the same name used in burial rites all over New Zealand. This significance lasted until the local population mostly converted to Christianity, and the spring was capped with a reservoir, with little protest from the mostly converted population of the area. However, the spring soon disappeared and only reappeared at the bottom of the cliff, making the reservoir useless.

== Restoration ==
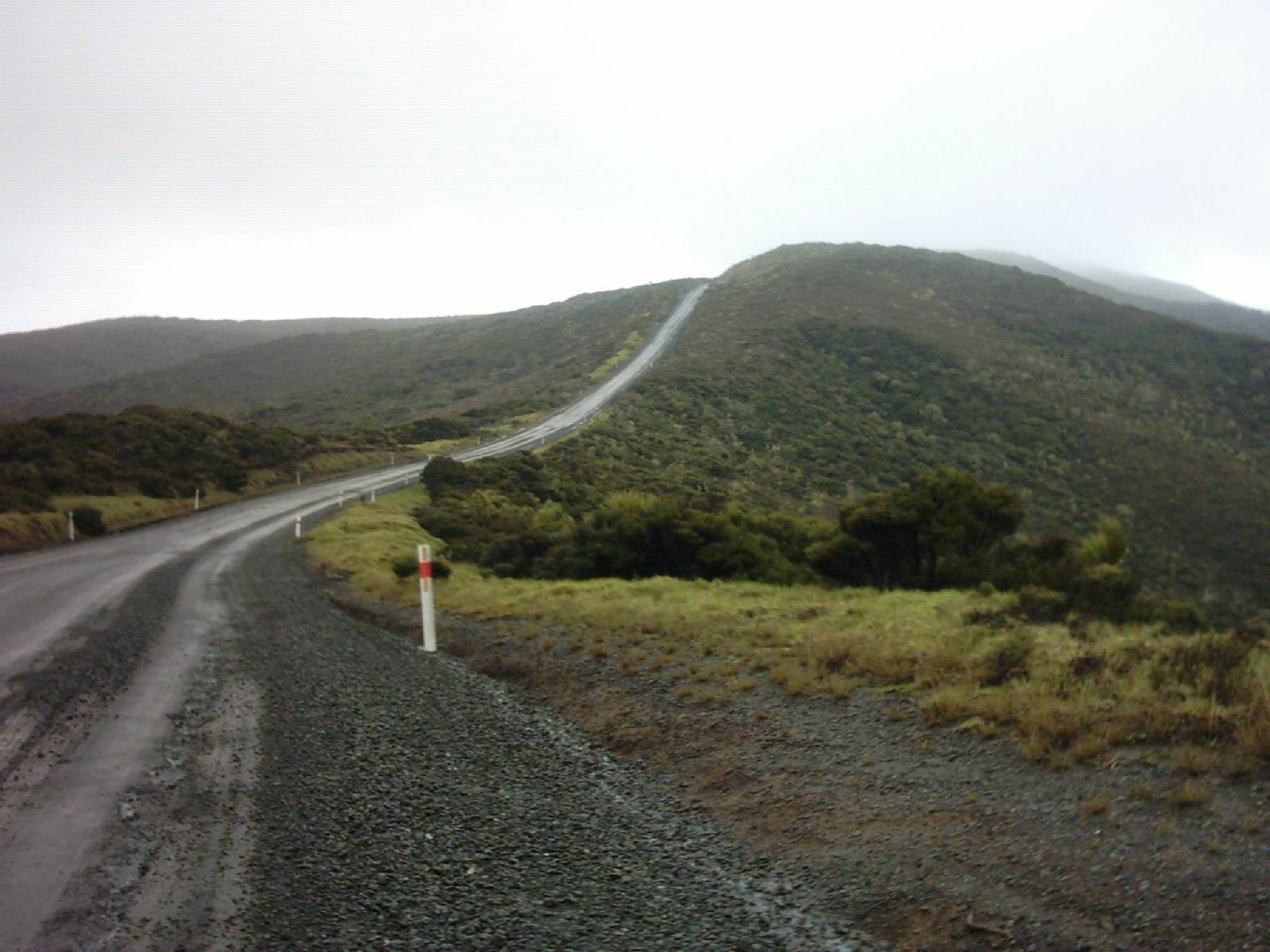
The former metal road (actually State Highway 1) to Cape Reinga in 2005, sealing being finished in 2010. 'Metal road' is a local term for a gravel road.

In 2007 protests by Māori and increased tourist numbers led the Department of Conservation to announce that the public carpark and toilet facilities, which intrude on traditionally sacred ground, would be moved further away from the cape and extended, at a cost of NZ$6.5 million (for details, see external links below). The road to the cape, one of the last stretches of State Highway 1, was sealed following three years of work and include extensive roadside revegetation with over 150,000 plants to prevent erosion. In March 2009, the works on the visitor facilities were completed.

== Climate ==
Cape Reinga has a very mild oceanic climate (Cfb) with high precipitation and little temperature difference between the seasons.

Climate data for Cape Reinga (1991–2020 normals, extremes 1971–present)
Month	Jan	Feb	Mar	Apr	May	Jun	Jul	Aug	Sep	Oct	Nov	Dec	Year
Record high °C (°F)	26.5 (79.7)	28.4 (83.1)	26.5 (79.7)	25.9 (78.6)	23.3 (73.9)	21.0 (69.8)	19.0 (66.2)	19.5 (67.1)	21.6 (70.9)	22.3 (72.1)	23.9 (75.0)	25.1 (77.2)	28.4 (83.1)
Mean maximum °C (°F)	25.0 (77.0)	25.6 (78.1)	24.7 (76.5)	23.1 (73.6)	20.6 (69.1)	18.2 (64.8)	17.4 (63.3)	17.5 (63.5)	18.5 (65.3)	19.8 (67.6)	21.3 (70.3)	23.1 (73.6)	25.8 (78.4)
Mean daily maximum °C (°F)	21.9 (71.4)	22.9 (73.2)	21.7 (71.1)	19.9 (67.8)	17.6 (63.7)	15.5 (59.9)	14.7 (58.5)	14.8 (58.6)	15.6 (60.1)	16.9 (62.4)	18.1 (64.6)	20.1 (68.2)	18.3 (65.0)
Daily mean °C (°F)	18.9 (66.0)	19.8 (67.6)	18.9 (66.0)	17.4 (63.3)	15.4 (59.7)	13.4 (56.1)	12.6 (54.7)	12.6 (54.7)	13.3 (55.9)	14.3 (57.7)	15.4 (59.7)	17.4 (63.3)	15.8 (60.4)
Mean daily minimum °C (°F)	15.9 (60.6)	16.8 (62.2)	16.1 (61.0)	14.8 (58.6)	13.2 (55.8)	11.4 (52.5)	10.5 (50.9)	10.3 (50.5)	10.9 (51.6)	11.8 (53.2)	12.7 (54.9)	14.6 (58.3)	13.3 (55.8)
Mean minimum °C (°F)	13.8 (56.8)	14.5 (58.1)	13.8 (56.8)	11.5 (52.7)	9.7 (49.5)	8.0 (46.4)	7.2 (45.0)	7.8 (46.0)	7.6 (45.7)	8.7 (47.7)	9.9 (49.8)	12.1 (53.8)	6.3 (43.3)
Record low °C (°F)	9.9 (49.8)	10.0 (50.0)	9.9 (49.8)	7.2 (45.0)	5.6 (42.1)	5.3 (41.5)	4.4 (39.9)	3.6 (38.5)	4.5 (40.1)	5.5 (41.9)	7.8 (46.0)	9.0 (48.2)	3.6 (38.5)
Average rainfall mm (inches)	58.0 (2.28)	64.6 (2.54)	55.7 (2.19)	108.6 (4.28)	95.5 (3.76)	103.1 (4.06)	128.4 (5.06)	95.3 (3.75)	84.5 (3.33)	61.1 (2.41)	57.2 (2.25)	75.5 (2.97)	987.5 (38.88)
Source: Earth Sciences NZ (rainfall 1981–2010)

== Lighthouse ==
The lighthouse at Cape Reinga was built in 1941 and first lit during May of that year, replacing a lighthouse located on nearby Motuopao Island, which had been built 1879. In 1987, the lighthouse was fully automated and the lighthouse keepers were withdrawn. The previous 1000 watt light and its revolving Fresnel lens have since been replaced with a tiny 50 watt flashing beacon, lodged in their place in the huge lantern.
