= Iwi =

Largest social unit in traditional Māori culture

Iwi (Māori pronunciation: [ˈiwi]) are the largest social units in New Zealand Māori society. Iwi roughly means 'people' or 'nation' in the Māori language, and is often translated as "tribe". The word is both singular and plural in Māori, and is typically pluralised as such in English.

Iwi groups trace their ancestry to the original Polynesian migrants who, according to tradition, arrived from Hawaiki. Some iwi cluster into larger groupings that are based on whakapapa (genealogical tradition) and known as waka (literally 'canoes', with reference to the original migration voyages). These super-groupings are generally symbolic rather than logistical. In pre-European times, most Māori associated in relatively small groups in the form of hapū ('sub-tribes') and whānau ('family'). Each iwi contains a number of hapū; among the hapū of the Ngāti Whātua iwi, for example, are Te Uri-o-Hau, Te Roroa, Te Taoū, and Ngāti Whātua-o-Ōrākei. Māori use the word rohe for the territory or boundaries of iwi.

In modern-day New Zealand, iwi can exercise significant political power in the management of land and other assets. For example, the 1997 Treaty of Waitangi settlement between the New Zealand Government and Ngāi Tahu compensated iwi for various losses of the rights guaranteed under the Treaty of Waitangi of 1840. As of 2019 the tribe has collective assets under management of $1.85 billion. Iwi affairs can have a real impact on New Zealand politics and society. A 2004 attempt by some iwi to test in court their ownership of the seabed and foreshore areas polarised public opinion (see New Zealand foreshore and seabed controversy).

== Naming ==
In Māori and many other Polynesian languages, iwi literally means 'bone', derived from Proto-Oceanic *suRi₁, meaning 'thorn, splinter, fish bone'. Māori may refer to returning home after travelling or living elsewhere as "going back to the bones" — literally to the burial areas of ancestors. Māori author Keri Hulme's novel The Bone People (1985) has a title linked directly to this dual meaning of bone and "tribal people".

Many iwi names begin with Ngāti or with Ngāi (from ngā āti and ngā ai respectively, both meaning roughly 'the offspring of'). Ngāti has become a productive morpheme in New Zealand English to refer to groups of people: examples are Ngāti Pākehā (Pākehā as a group), Ngāti Pōneke (Māori who have migrated to the Wellington region), and Ngāti Rānana (Māori living in London). Ngāti Tūmatauenga ("Tribe of Tūmatauenga", the god of war) is the official Māori-language name of the New Zealand Army. Hawaiian navigator Nainoa Thompson and his crew upon the Hōkūleʻa canoe were inducted among the Te Tai Tokerau Māori by James Henare as the iwi of Ngāti Ruawāhia (“Tribe of the Arcturus”) after their successful voyage from Rarotonga to Waitangi in 1985, the admission of Ngāti Ruawāhia was formalised in 2018.

In the southern dialect of Māori, Ngāti and Ngāi become Kāti and Kāi, terms found in such iwi names as Kāti Māmoe and Kāi Tahu (also known as Ngāi Tahu).

== Structure ==
Each iwi has a generally recognised territory (rohe), but many of these overlap, sometimes completely. This has added a layer of complication to the long-running discussions and court cases about how to resolve historical Treaty claims. The length of coastline emerged as one factor in the final (2004) legislation to allocate fishing-rights in settlement of claims relating to commercial fisheries.

=== Self-determination ===
Iwi can become a prospective vehicle for ideas and ideals of self-determination and/or tino rangatiratanga. Thus does Te Pāti Māori mention in the preamble of its constitution "the dreams and aspirations of tangata whenua to achieve self-determination for whānau, hapū and iwi within their own land". Some Tūhoe envisage self-determination in specifically iwi-oriented terms.

=== Iwi identity ===
Increasing urbanisation of Māori has led to a situation where a significant percentage do not identify with any particular iwi. The following extract from a 2000 High Court of New Zealand judgment discussing the process of settling fishing rights illustrates some of the issues:

... 81 per cent of Maori now live in urban areas, at least one-third live outside their tribal influence, more than one-quarter do not know their iwi or for some reason do not choose to affiliate with it, at least 70 per cent live outside the traditional tribal territory and these will have difficulties, which in many cases will be severe, in both relating to their tribal heritage and in accessing benefits from the settlement. It is also said that many Maori reject tribal affiliation because of a working-class unemployed attitude, defiance and frustration. Related but less important factors, are that a hapu may belong to more than one iwi, a particular hapu may have belonged to different iwi at different times, the tension caused by the social and economic power moving from the iwi down rather than from the hapu up, and the fact that many iwi do not recognise spouses and adoptees who do not have kinship links.

In the 2006 census, 16 per cent of the 643,977 people who claimed Māori ancestry did not know their iwi. Another 11 per cent did not state their iwi, or stated only a general geographic region, or merely gave a waka name. Initiatives like the Iwi Helpline are trying to make it easier for people to identify their iwi, and the proportion who "don't know" dropped relative to previous censuses.

=== Pan-tribalism ===
Some established pan-tribal organisations may exert influence across iwi divisions. The Rātana Church, for example, operates across iwi divisions, and the Māori King Movement, though principally congregated around Waikato/Tainui, aims to transcend some iwi functions in a wider grouping.

== Major iwi ==
=== Largest iwi by population ===
1. Ngāpuhi – 165,201 (in 2018) – based in the Northland Region
2. Ngāti Porou – 92,349 (in 2018) – based in Gisborne Region and East Cape
3. Waikato Tainui – 84,030 (in 2018) – based in the Waikato Region
4. Ngāti Kahungunu – 82,239 (in 2018) based on the East Coast of the North Island.
5. Ngāi Tahu/ Kāi Tahu – 74,082(in 2018) based in the South Island.
6. Te Arawa – 60,719 (in 2018) – based in the Bay of Plenty Region
7. Ngāti Tūwharetoa – 47,930 (in 2018) – based in the central North Island.
8. Ngāi Tūhoe – 46,479 (in 2018) – based in Te Urewera and Whakatāne
9. Ngāti Maniapoto – 45,719 (in 2018) – based in Waikato and Waitomo
10. Ngāti Raukawa – 31,029 (in 2023) – based in Waikato, Manawatū–Whanganui, and Greater Wellington.

=== Other iwi by population ===
1. No affiliation – 110,928 (in 2013) – includes New-Zealand-based Māori with no iwi affiliation
2. Te Hiku, or Muriwhenua – 33,711 (in 2013) – group of iwi and hapū in the Northland region
3. Te Āti Awa – 23,094 (in 2013) – group of iwi and hapū in Taranaki and Wellington
4. Hauraki Māori – 14,313 (in 2013) – group of iwi and hapū at or around the Hauraki Gulf

=== Other notable iwi ===
- Ngāti Toa (based in Porirua, having migrated from Waikato in the 1820s under the leadership of Te Rauparaha)
- Ngāti Tama (based in Taranaki, Chatham Islands, Wellington and Te Tau Ihu)
- Ngāti Ruanui (based in the Taranaki region)
- Ngāruahine (based in South Taranaki)
- Te Āti Awa – Taranaki and Lower Hutt
- Ngāti Hikairo -rangatiratanga in Kāwhia, Ōpārau and Waipā in the King Country)
- Whakatōhea (based in the Ōpōtiki district)
- Ngāti Whātua (based in and north of Auckland – notably Bastion Point in Ōrākei)

== Iwi radio ==
Many iwi operate or are affiliated with media organisations. Most of these belong to Te Whakaruruhau o Ngā Reo Irirangi Māori (the National Māori Radio Network), a group of radio stations which receive contestable Government funding from Te Māngai Pāho (the Māori Broadcast Funding Agency) to operate on behalf of iwi and hapū. Under their funding agreement, the stations must produce programmes in the local Māori language and actively promote local Māori culture.

A two-year Massey University survey of 30,000 people published in 2003 indicated 50 per cent of Māori in National Māori Radio Network broadcast areas listened to an iwi station. An Auckland University of Technology study in 2009 suggested the audience of iwi radio stations would increase as the growing New Zealand Māori population tried to keep a connection to their culture, family history, spirituality, community, language and iwi.

The Victoria University of Wellington Te Reo Māori Society campaigned for Māori radio, helping to set up Te Reo o Poneke, the first Māori-owned radio operation, using airtime on Wellington student-radio station Radio Active in 1983. Twenty-one iwi radio stations were set up between 1989 and 1994, receiving Government funding in accordance with a Treaty of Waitangi claim. This group of radio stations formed various networks, becoming Te Whakaruruhau o Ngā Reo Irirangi Māori.
