= In the Beginning (Peter Gossage book) =

2001 novel by Peter Gossage

- Book cover
- Author: Peter Gossage
- Illustrator: Peter Gossage
- Language: English/Te Reo Māori
- Genre: Fiction
- Publication date: 5 October 2001
- Publication place: New Zealand
- Pages: 32 pp (Paperback)
- ISBN: 1869436121

In the Beginning is a 2001 New Zealand children's book by Peter Gossage, a New Zealand author. The book is a retelling of the Māori creation story and is sculpted around Māori mythology. Gossage writes about the struggle of Ranginui and Papatūānuku's children who are tired of living in the dark and trying to part their parents to allow light into Aotearoa.

== Plot summary ==
The book opens with the introduction of Aotearoa's parents, Rangi, the father and Papa, the mother. Many children were born into the darkness between the two of them, as Rangi lay on top of Papa. These sons were Tū, Tāne, Tāwhirimātea, Haumia, Rongo and their only daughter, Tangaroa. Living in the darkness between their parents caused some of their sons to become resentful of their dark and cramped life. As a result, a plan was devised to escape. Tū suggested killing their parents but Tāwhirimātea disagreed. Haumia and Rongo believed things should remain the way there were. Finally, Tāne came up with the idea to push the two of them apart. The siblings took turns standing and pushing upwards to force their parents apart. Tangaroa and Tū both failed while Tāwhirimātea refused to participate as he believed it was cruel to try and separate them. Finally, Tāne found a solution. He lay on his back and pressed his feet against his father's chest.

This caused Rangi to fly up into the air and light streamed all around the siblings. Now lonely and bare, Papa was left on the ground while Rangi soared the sky. Tāne clothed his mother in trees, flowers and ferns then dressed his father in the rainbows, clouds, stars, the sun and the moon. The spouses were separated. The siblings became the guardians of the land, each taking on important roles vital to the creation of Aotearoa and its prosperity. Tāne became the guardian spirit of the forest, Tū became God of man and war, Tangaroa became guardian of the sea, Tāwhirimātea became God of winds and storms, Haumia became guardian spirit of wild and uncultivated foods and Rongo became God of peace and agriculture.

== Characters ==
- Rangi - the father.
- Papa - the mother.
- Tū - God of Man and war.
- Tāne - Guardian spirit of the Forest.
- Tāwhirimātea - God of winds and storms.
- Tangaroa - Guardian of the sea.
- Haumia - Guardian spirit of wild and uncultivated foods.
- Rongo - God of peace and agriculture.

== Mythology ==
The story is inspired by the Māori origin story of New Zealand (Aotearoa) and how the land was created. Māori have many origin stories, but the most important of them all, passed down from generation to generation, is the story of how light came from darkness and how from nothing came life.

=== The separation of earth and sky ===
As told in Gossage's book, the siblings (Tūmatauenga, Tāne Mahuta, Tāwhirimātea, Haumietiketike, Rongomātāne and Tangaroa) were born between Rangi and Papa in darkness but decided to separate their parents to allow light to come into the world. Tāne did this by laying on his back and pushing his father up into the sky where he'd remain. With their parents separated and light flowing throughout Aotearoa, the children because gods of various parts of the natural world. Tāne because God of the forests and Tangaroa became God of the sea. This time of the story, where life is flourishing, nature is evolving, the siblings thrive; this is Te Ao- Mārama, the movement from darkness to the world of light. Just a Gossage's book had ended, Ranginui and Papatūānuku did not want to be separated from each other or their children. The couple wept for each other and were not angry with their children. Their sadness inspired the whakatauki (a Māori proverb) “Kei te heke ngā roimata o Ranginui” which translates to the tears of Ranginui are falling. Māori say this proverb when it is raining. Ranginui grieved for his love Papatūānuku and so Tāne, in response, turned his mother downwards so that she would not see Ranginui's sadness and as Gossage mentioned, he then clothed her in the flowers, trees and ferns.

In other iwi versions of this pūrākau, sometimes it is the moon that prompts the children to separate their parents, Rangi and Papa; in some other accounts, it is the sun.

=== Criticism ===
Gossage was met with harsh words when he approached Selwyn Muru from TV2 and asked, “Can you give us any advice?” Selwyn then replied with, “Why don’t you pākehā leave our culture alone?”

== See also ==
- Māori
- Te Ara
