= Urutengangana =

- Atua of stars
- Gender: Male
- Region: New Zealand
- Ethnic group: Māori

Genealogy
- Parents: Rangi and Papa
- Siblings: Whiro, Tāwhiri, Tangaroa, Kiwa, Tū, Tāne
- Consort: Moeahuru; Hineturama

Urutengangana is the god of light in Māori mythology. He is the firstborn of the children of the primordial parents, Ranginui the Sky father and Papatūānuku the Earth mother.

Also known as The Gleaming One, a personification of light, Urutengangana had two wives, Moeahuru and Hineturama, the first of whom gave birth to "the red sun" and "the waxing moon," while the later produced the stars. In the struggle between the forces of Light and Darkness, Urutengangana at first sided with Whiro, but, in later times, sided with Tāne.

== See also ==
Ao (mythology)
