= Ao (Māori mythology) =

Primal deity in Māori mythology

Ao (daylight) is one of the primal deities who are the unborn forces of nature in Māori mythology. Ao is the personification of light, clouds, and the ordinary world, as opposed to darkness (Pō) and the underworld.

He is spoken of under many forms or manifestations, including Aotūroa (enduring day, this world) and Aotahi (bright day, world of light and life). With his companions Ata (morning) and Whaitua (space) Ao resists the forces of darkness.

The term Te Ao Māori, loosely translated as "The Māori world", is used to refer to Māori tradition and culture.

== Genealogy ==
Ao appears evolving through the forms Aonui, Aoroa, Aowheneke, Ao-whetara out of the darkness as part of the great cosmological genealogies in Te Arawa's traditions, as part of the creation of the universe.

Aonui, Aoroa, Aopouri, Aopotango, Aowhetuma, Aowhekere, Aokahiwahiwa, Aokanapanapa, Aopakakina, Aopakarea, and Aotakawe were also the names of the atua who were the storm clouds, the children, of Tāwhirimātea, which were sent to punish his brothers after the separation of his parents, Rangi and Papa.

In a version recorded from Hūkiki Te Ahukaramū, a Ngāti Raukawa chief, Te Ao was born out of Te Ata, which itself came from the darkness. Ao's last form in Hūkiki's version is Te Ao Mārama. A version given by the Kāi Tahu of Moeraki is similar.

== Pan-Polynesian ==
In Tahiti, Aonui was Tāne's residence in the sky, and Aoaomaraia was the discoverer of fire; a similar role is taken on by Māui in other parts of Polynesia. (Note: Edward Tregear suggested that in some Polynesian areas, Ao may have been another name of Atea, Avatea, or Vatea.)

== See also ==
- Io Matua Kore
