= Whiro =

Māori god of darkness, evil and illness

Whiro-te-tipua
- Atua god of darkness, evil, and death
- Abode: Taiwhetuki
- Gender: Male
- Region: Polynesia
- Ethnic group: Māori, Paʻumotu people

Genealogy
- Parents: Ranginui and Papatuinuku
- Siblings: Urutengangana, Tāwhiri, Tangaroa, Kiwa, Tū, Tāne

Whiro-te-tipua (aka Whiro) is the lord of darkness and embodiment of all evil in Māori mythology. Usually depicted as a lizard-like creature, he inhabits the underworld and is responsible for the ills of all people, a contrast to his brother and enemy Tāne.

According to some tribes, when people die, their bodies descend into the underworld, where they are eaten by Whiro. Each time Whiro eats a body, he becomes stronger. This process will eventually make him sufficiently powerful to break free of the underworld, at which point he will come to the surface and devour everything and everyone on it. Cremation is therefore recommended to prevent this, because Whiro cannot gain strength from ashes.

Taiwhetuki – Whiro's House of Death – is a deep and dark cave where all things evil are preserved, such as black magic. It is a place in which countless personifications of illnesses and diseases dwell.

Geckos, skinks, and tuatara were feared because of their spiritual association with Whiro.

Whiro is also used as a name for the planet Mercury and for the new moon.

== Confusion ==
Whiro-te-tipua (Iro in Rarotonga) was a Polynesian voyager who shared a name with the offspring of Papatūānuku and Ranginui. Little was known as to whether he actually arrived in New Zealand, though some of the tribes trace their lineage from him, especially perhaps the people of Whanganui.

== See also ==
- Ghosts and spirits in Māori culture
- Hades
