= Atua =

Polynesian gods and spirits

Atua (Akua in Hawaii) are the gods and spirits of the Polynesian people such as the Māori or the Hawaiians (see also Kupua). The literal meaning of the Polynesian word is "power" or "strength" and so the concept is similar to that of mana. Many of the atua that are known have originated from myths and legends of each Polynesian culture before Christianity was introduced. These days, the word atua is related to the monotheistic conception of God. However for Polynesian cultures, as opposed to having only one superior god, there are multiple atua.

For Māori, there are eight main atua – excluding the parents, Ranginui (sky father) and Papatūānuku (earth mother):

- Tāne Mahuta – god of the forest and all forest creatures such as animals, birds and trees;
- Tāwhirimātea – god of wind and storms;
- Haumia-tiketike – god of uncultivated food and fernroot (also known as Haumia, Haumia-tikitiki, and Haumia-roa);
- Rongo-mā-Tāne – god of Agriculture and Peace (also known as Rongohīrea and Rongomaraeroa);
- Tangaroa – god of the sea;
- Tūmatauenga – god of war and humans (also known as Tūkāriri);
- Rūaumoko – god of earthquakes (also known as Rūaimoko);
- Whiro-te-tipua – god of darkness, evil, and death.

In the Samoan language, where atua means "god", traditional tattooing was based on the doctrine of tutelary spirits. There is also a district on the island of Upolu in Samoa called Atua. Atua or gods are also at the centre of Māori mythology. In traditional Māori belief, there is no specific word for "religion" because the natural and supernatural world are seen as one.

In other Austronesian cultures, cognates of atua include the Polynesian aitu, Micronesian aniti, Bunun hanitu, Filipino and Tao anito, and Malaysian and Indonesian hantu or antu.

Similar to Māori, there are many Samoan mythologies with deities ("atua"). In Samoa, there two types of atua: atua (non-human origins) and aitu (human origins). In Samoa, the atua known as Tagaloa was regarded as the creator of all beings.^{[6]} The atua known as Savea was recognized as being the ruler over Pulotu, the underworld of spirits. He is a complex figure in Samoan mythology and represents death and life.^{[7]} Mafui'e was known as the god of earthquakes.^{[8]} However, since Christianity was introduced to Samoa in 1830^{[9]}, the existence and belief of these deities were soon forgotten by the Samoan people, leaving only their myths and stories.

== In popular culture ==
In popular culture, Atua is the name that is used to refer to the deity which the character Angie Yonaga worships in the English dub of Danganronpa V3: Killing Harmony. The term "Atua" is often associated with her character.

== See also ==
- Hawaiian religion
- List of Māori deities
- Māori mythology
- Polynesian mythology
- Zanahary
