= Rongo =

Māori god of cultivated plants

- Māori god of kūmara and cultivated plants, Mangaian god of agriculture and war
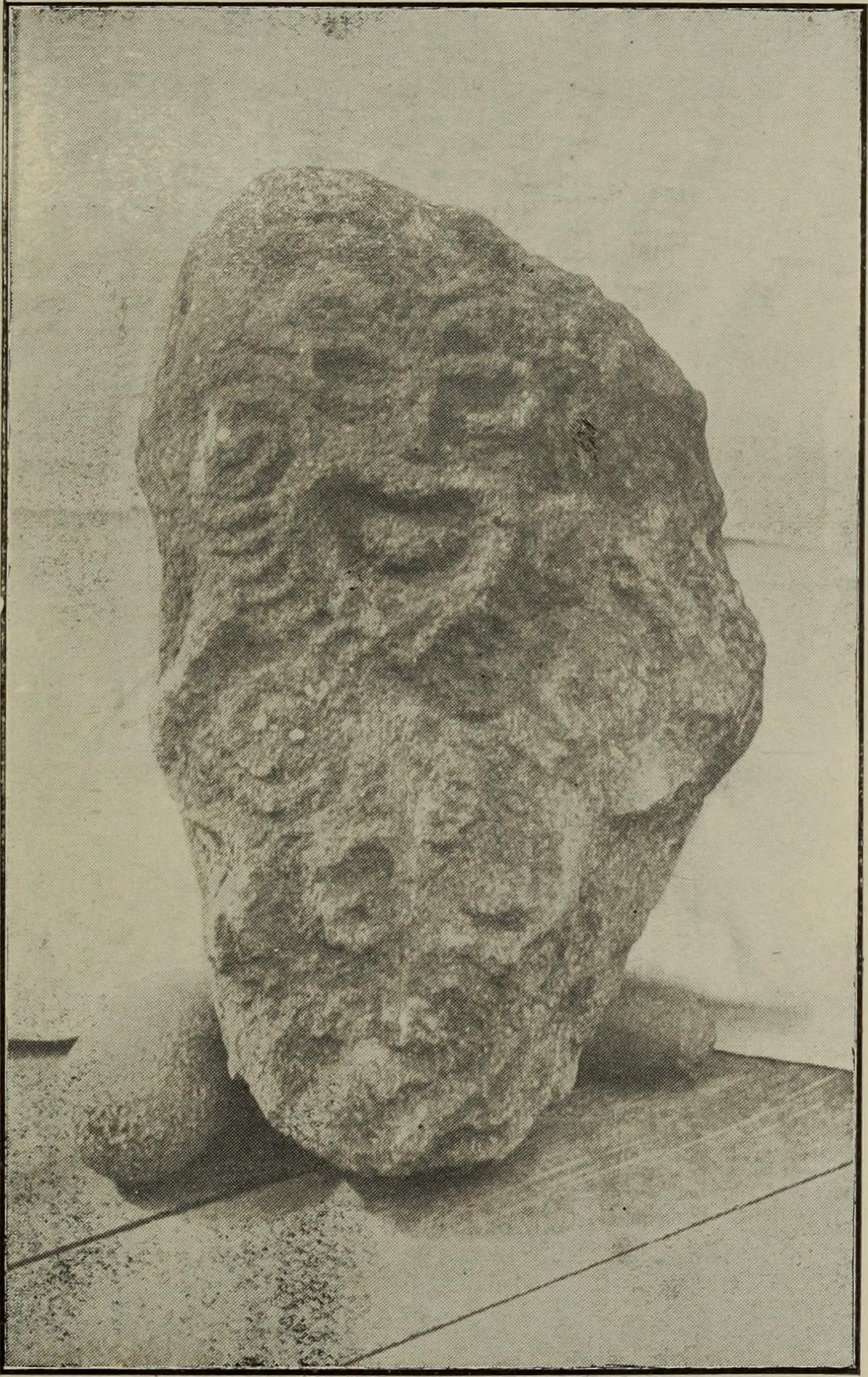
- Other names: Rongo-hīrea, Rongo-mā-Tāne, Rongo-marae-roa, Rongo-marae-roa-a-Rangi
- Major cult centre: Orongo marae (Mangaia)
- Gender: Male
- Region: Polynesia
- Ethnic group: New Zealand Māori, Southern Cook Islands Māori, particularly Mangaians

Genealogy
- Parents: Rangi and Papa (Arawa tribes), or Vatea and Papa (southern Cook Islands), or Tāne (Ngāti Awa tribe)
- Siblings: Rehua, Urutengangana, Haumia, Tāne, Tangaroa, Tāwhirimātea, Tū, Rūaumoko
- Consort: Te-po-tatango, Tavake (Mangaia)
- Offspring: Tavake, Rangi, Mokoiro, Akatauira (Mangaia)

In Māori mythology, Rongo or Rongo-mā-Tāne (also Rongo-hīrea, Rongo-marae-roa, and Rongo-marae-roa-a-Rangi) is a major god (atua) of cultivated plants, especially kūmara, a vital crop. Other crops cultivated by Māori in traditional times included taro, yams (uwhi), cordyline (tī), and gourds (hue). Because of their tropical origin, most of these crops were difficult to grow except in the far north of the North Island, hence the importance of Rongo in New Zealand.

He was also an important god of agriculture and god of war in the southern Cook Islands, especially on Mangaia where the Akaoro marae and Orongo marae were centres of his worship; where cooked taro was offered to him to assure success in battle and the fertility of land.

A legend concerning Rongo flying the first kite is told in the waiting room of Walt Disney's Enchanted Tiki Room, in which Rongo is voiced by Ernest Tavares.

== Separation of the primordial parents ==
In the creation story of the tribes of the Arawa canoe, Rongo, with his brothers Tū, Tāne, Tangaroa, and Haumia-tiketike, agreed that the primordial parents Rangi and Papa needed to be separated to allow daylight into the world. A sixth brother, Tāwhirimātea, the god of storms, did not consent to this and afterwards attacked his brothers with unrelenting fury. Rongo and Haumia, the god of wild food, took refuge in the body of Papa, mother earth, who hid them until the storm passed (Grey 1956:7, Tregear 1891:424, Orbell 1998:121).

== Kūmara ==
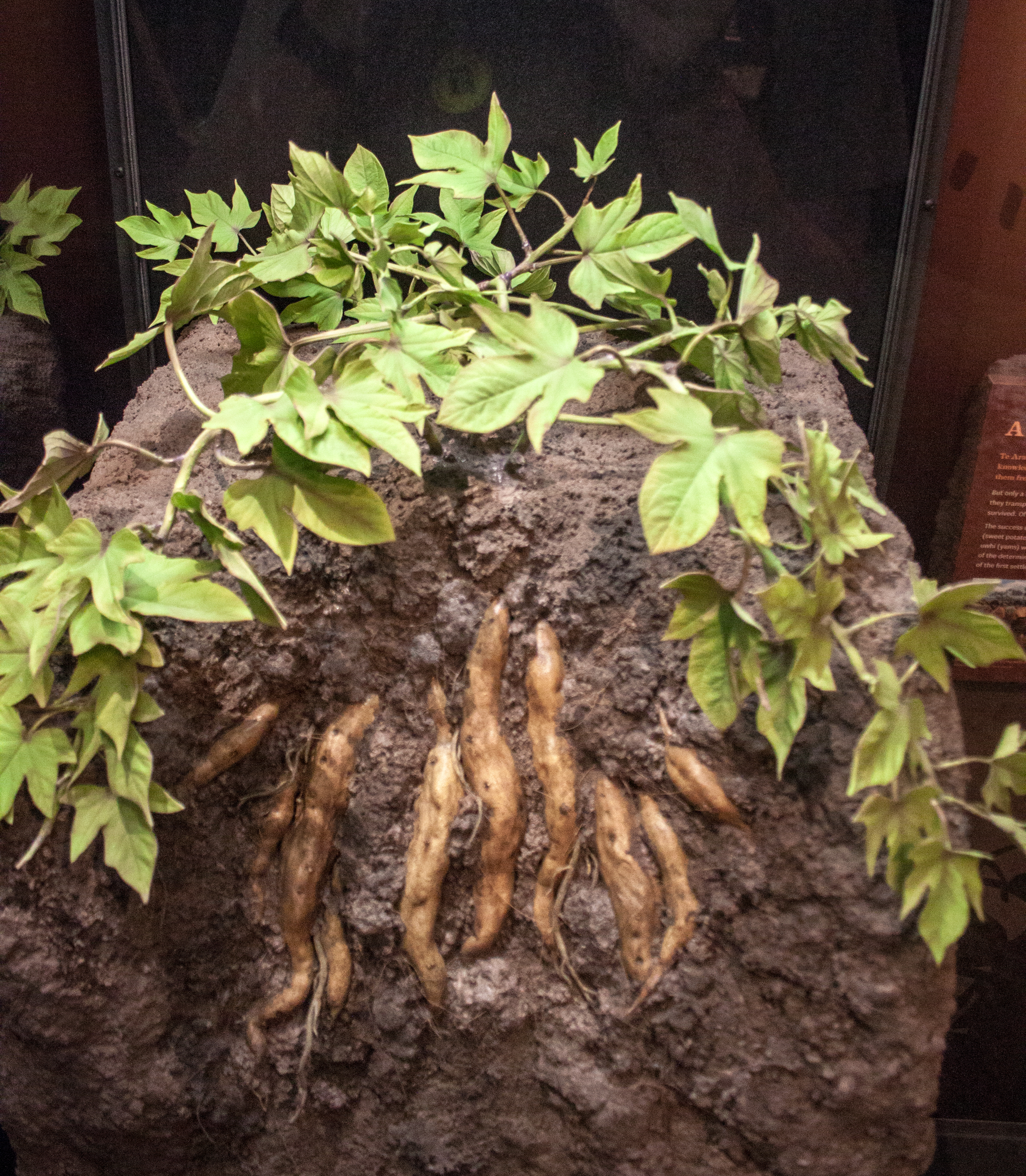
Taputini, a pre-European cultivar kūmara

He would have had more of an association with the small, yellow-skin, finger-sized variety known as hutihuti, rekamaroa, and taputini, which the Māori had brought with them from eastern Polynesia, rather than larger varieties brought by later sealers, traders, and whalers in the early 19th century.

In the Māori language, rongo can mean 'peace' (after war). Rongo is generally portrayed as the creator of the kūmara, a plant associated with peace; probably because the intense cultivation it needed was best performed in times of peace.

In Ngāti Awa traditions, Rongo is a son of Tāne and father of the kūmara, but a man named Rongo-māui travels to Whānui, from whom he steals the kūmara and returns to Earth with it.

Small statues representing Rongo were once placed alongside kūmara fields.

== Rongo in the Cook Islands ==
In southern Cook Islands mythology, Rongo was the god of agriculture and one of the children of Vatea (sky father) and Papa (earth mother). His twin brother was Tangaroa, the god of the sea. Rongo was the principal deity of Mangaia.

In the Mangaian legend of origin, Rongo's sons by his wife Tavake (his daughter by his wife Te-po-tatango), Rangi, Mokoiro, and Akatauira, lifted the island of Mangaia up out of the underworld, becoming the first settlers and the ancestors of the Nga Ariki tribe, with Rangi becoming the first chief. The traditional name of the island was A'u A'u, which literally means 'terraced', short for A'u A'u Nui o Rongo ki te Ao Marama ('Great Terraced Land of Rongo in the Land of Daylight').

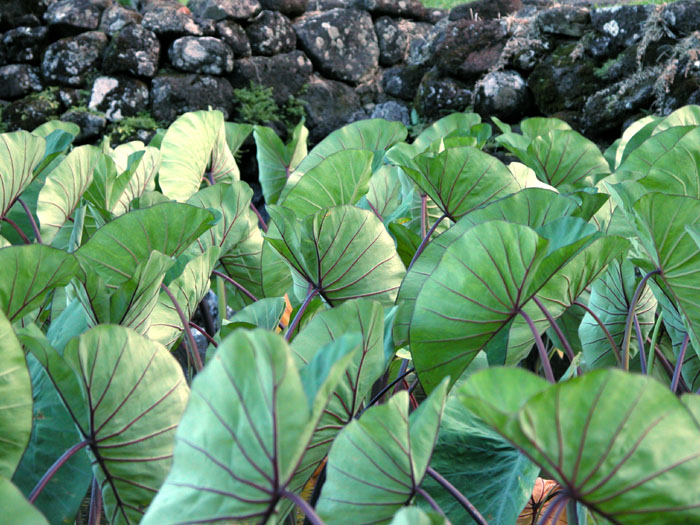
Taro

In Mangaian society, the ritual system to become the principal chief, Te Mangaia, emphasized the worship of Rongo. The installation of a new Te Mangaia after a war of conquest of the puna lands required a human sacrifice to Rongo. He was both the god of war and god of taro irrigation; his regular peacetime offerings were parcels of cooked taro. The ideological linkages between Rongo, war, taro, and human sacrifice were complex: Rongo assured success in war and fertility of the land, but these required continual sacrifices in both human bodies and taro in an endless cycle. He would feast on the souls of those who died in battle.

Principal places of Rongo's Mangaian worship were at two marae in the Keia district; the inland Akaoro marae, and the coastal Orongo marae, which was arguably the most important of all marae on the island, and constructed at the site of an abandoned village of the same name. Both have since been destroyed along with many other symbols of old gods with the introduction of Christianity in the early 19th century. They were presided over by two hereditary High Priests of Rongo. At the Orongo marae a human sacrifice was laid on a smooth block of limestone or sandstone in front of Rongo's image. Human bone fragments can still be found among the remnants at the site. At the Akaoro marae, it is evident that a platform of hala wood was erected for human sacrifice, although no traces of raised platforms have been found. In the Ivirua district was also Ivanui marae, but this was abandoned in favour of Orongo marae; it was referred to in an eva dance:

Cook Islands Māori

'Aore oa te paepae o Rongo e taea,
E paepae tuatinitini tuamanomano,
Kota'i 'ua e tae
O te 'i'iri, o te rarama.

Translation

The platform of Rongo cannot be ascended,
A platform open to the thousands and to myriads,
One only can reach it,
Wisdom and learning

A reference to Rongo is such:

Cook Islands Māori

'A va te ua i ta'aruku
A tomo a Rongo i roto i tona 'are,
E 'are turu ariki.

Translation

When the rain is heard on the leaves,
Rongo enters into his house,
A house of chiefly prestige.

== See also ==
- Laka
- Lono
- Domesticated plants and animals of Austronesia

== Bibliography ==
- G. Grey, Polynesian Mythology, Illustrated edition, reprinted 1976. (Whitcombe and Tombs: Christchurch), 1956.
- M. Orbell, The Concise Encyclopedia of Māori Myth and Legend (Canterbury University Press: Christchurch), 1998.
- E.R. Tregear, Maori-Polynesian Comparative Dictionary (Lyon and Blair: Lambton Quay), 1891.
- Patrick V. Kirch, "Natural Experiments of History" anthology edited by Jared Diamond and James A. Robinson, Chapter one "Controlled Comparison and Polynesian Cultural Evolution" by Patrick V. Kirch, pages 28 & 29, (The Belknap Press of Harvard University Press Cambridge, Massachusetts & London, England), 2010.
