= Rangahore =

Māori mythological character

In Māori mythology, Rangahore is a wife of god Tāne. Tāne was looking for a wife and asked his mother Papatūānuku to suggest suitable candidates. He took Rangahore to wife, but she gave birth to a stone, and Tane forsook her (Shortland 1882:20-21, Tregear 1891:391).
