= Maru (mythology) =

Māori war god

- Māori god of fresh water, Kāi Tahu god of war
- Gender: Male
- Region: Polynesia
- Ethnic group: Māori, Hawaiʻi maoli
- Parents: Rangihore

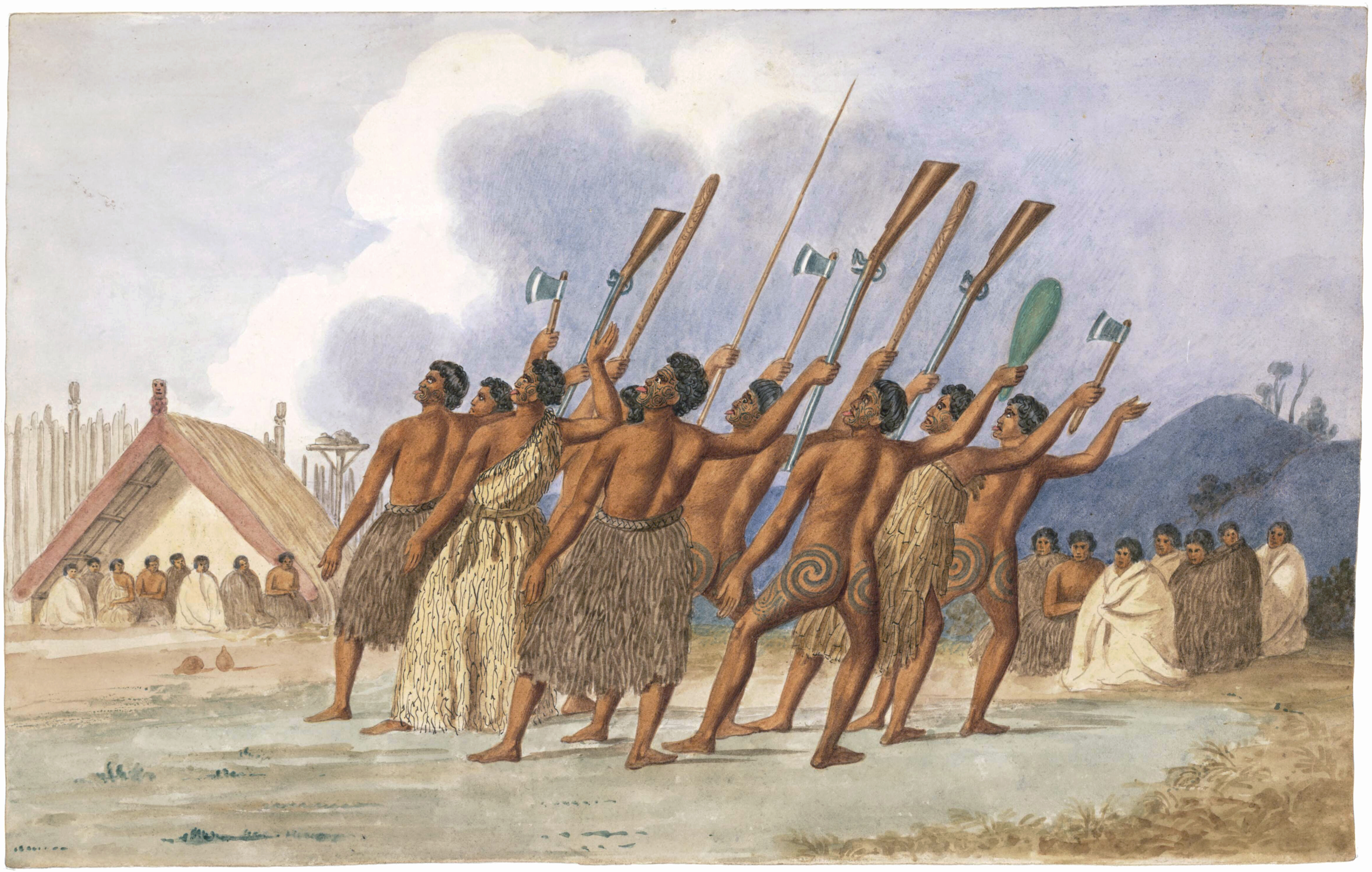
A Maori war dance

Maru is a Māori war god, especially well known in southern New Zealand, where he replaces Tūmatauenga (commonly shortened to Tū), the war god of the rest of New Zealand. In the Hawaiian Islands he is an evil and restless god who has no time to grow his own food and nonetheless rewards his priests' services.

Maru is the son of Rangihore (god of rocks and stones) and the grandson of Māui. Maru's image was brought to New Zealand by Manaia's daughter Haungaroa.

He was also known as the god of wai maori (fresh water) like streams and rivers.

== See also ==
- Hawaiian religion
- Māori mythology
