= Tagroa Siria =

Fijian deity

Tagroa Siria ("God Above", or "God the Highest" in the Rotuman language) was the supreme deity in pre-Christian Rotuman society. He is understood to be the Rotuman version of the pan-Pacific deity Tangaroa.

In Rotuman mythology, he was said to live in 'Oroi ta (literally "the hidden", meaning the underworld-like spirit region), and was the most powerful of all the deities in the Rotuman pantheon. Like most faith systems at the time, his main role was as part of the fertility cult, ensuring the prosperity of the island and its people.

First born sons in Rotuman families were tossed in the air as a dedication to Tagroa.

== See also ==
- Tagaloa
- Tangaroa
