= Tūmatauenga =

Māori war god

- Atua of war, hunting, cooking, fishing, and food cultivation
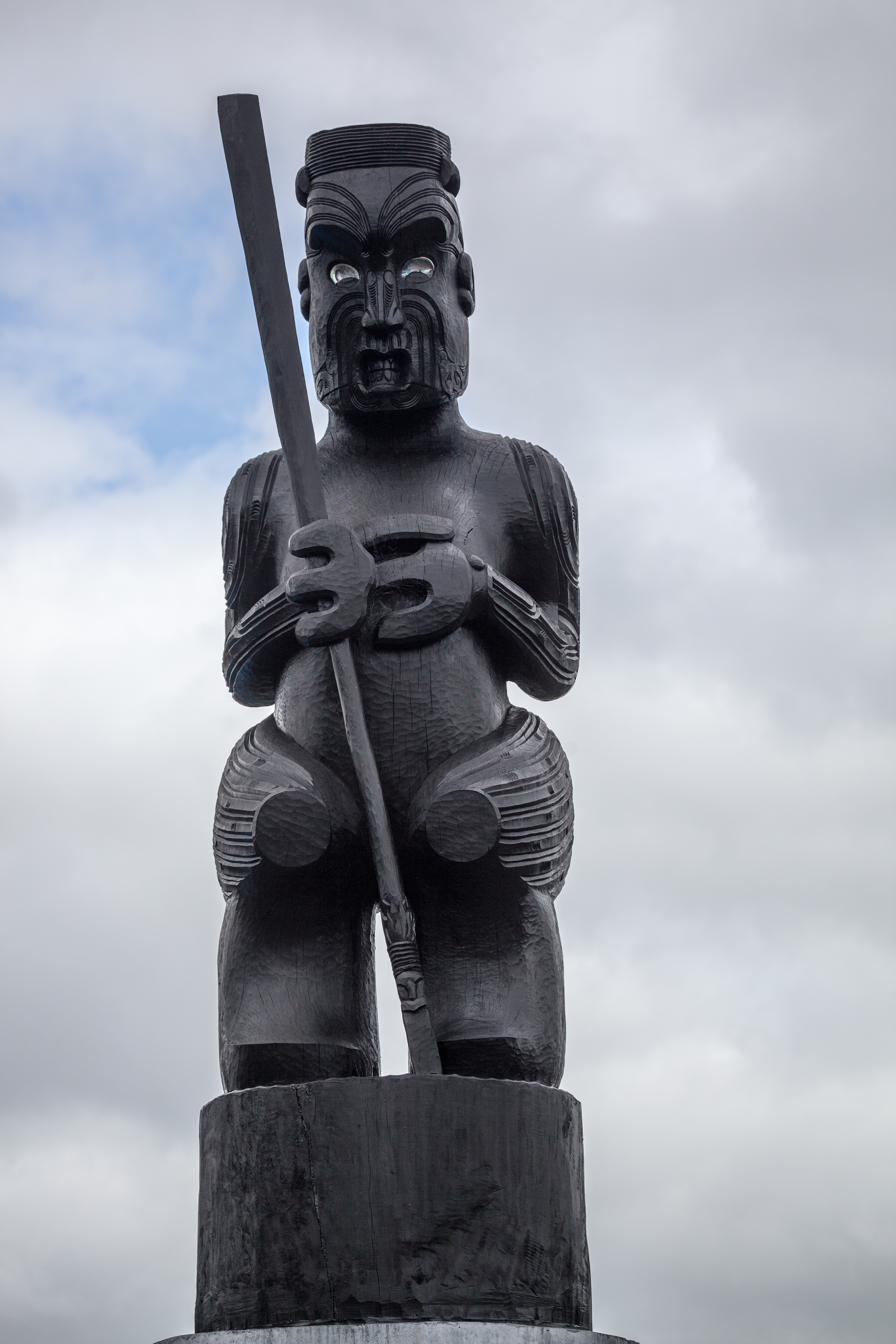
- Statue of Tūmatauenga at Eden Park, Auckland
- Other names: Tūkāriri; Tūwhakamoana-ariki; Tūkaitangata; Tūkaitaua; Tūmatawhāiti; Tūtawake; Tūtengaehe; Tūkanguha; Tūwhakaheketangata
- Gender: Male
- Region: New Zealand
- Ethnic group: Māori

Genealogy
- Parents: Ranginui and Papatūānuku
- Siblings: Urutengangana; Whiro; Tāwhirimātea; Tangaroa; Haumia-tiketike; Tāne Mahuta; Rūaumoko; Rongo-mā-Tāne

In Māori mythology, Tūmatauenga (Tū of the angry face) is the primary god (atua) of war and human activities such as hunting, food cultivation, fishing, and cooking.

In creation stories, Tū suggests to kill his parents to allow light into the world. After they are instead separated. One of his brothers Tāwhirimātea was not happy with this and had declared war against his brothers and Tū was the only one who fought while the other brothers hid away avoiding the fight. Because of his brothers actions and having to fight Tāwhiri alone, he wars with his brothers and becomes the origin of humanity's activities, and the reasons for their behaviour when interacting with the creations of his brothers.

As the god of war, all taua were dedicated to him and he was treated with the greatest respect and awe. Tūmatauenga inspires the New Zealand Army's Māori name: Ngāti Tūmatauenga where all soldiers are deemed of the same iwi ("tribe") under the deity's patronage regardless of racial heritage. The marae is often considered the umu pokapoka a Tūmatauenga – fiery ovens of Tūmatauenga – the realm of Tūmatauenga, whereas all areas where battles take place become Te Marae Ātea a Tūmatauenga – the battle domain of Tūmatauenga.

== Names and epithets ==
After his victories over his brothers, Tū assumed many names; one name for each of the characteristics he displayed in his victories over his brothers, including:

- Tū-kā-riri (Tū the angry)
- Tū-ka-nguha (Tū the fierce fighter)
- Tū-kai-tangata (Tū who destroys humankind)
- Tū-kai-taua (Tū the destroyer of armies)
- Tū-mata-whāiti (Tū the cunning)
- Tū-mata-uenga (Tū of the angry face)
- Tū-tawake (Tū who hastens)
- Tū-te-ngaehe (Tū who tears apart)
- Tū-whakaheke-tangata (Tū the demoter of personages)
- Tū-whakamoana-ariki (Tū who enriches the sea)

== Earth's creation ==
A traditional creation story tells that all the children of Rangi and Papa, the sky father and earth mother, lay in a tight embrace together, their children forced to crawl in the darkness between the two. One day, their children become so sick of this that they discuss a plan to separate them and allow light into the world. Tū advises his brothers to kill their parents, but the kinder proposal of Tāne is accepted and he instead forces the primordial pair apart.

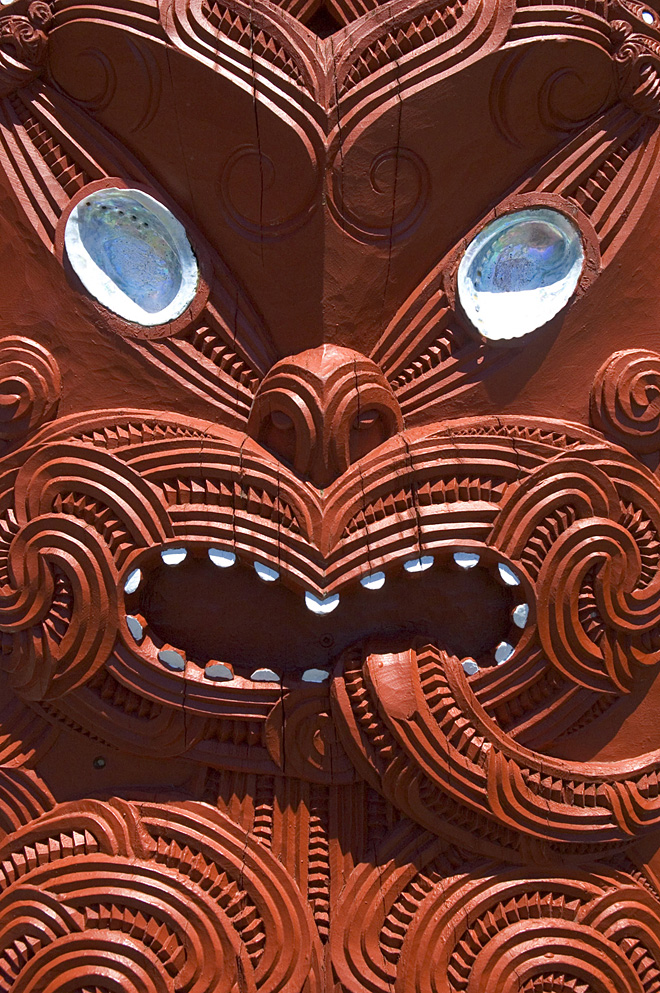
A human face depicted in a house carving from Whakarewarewa, 2005. Tūmatauenga, god of war, is the ancestor of humankind.

In a Te Arawa version, Tū thinks about the actions of Tāne in separating their parents, and makes snares to catch the birds, the children of Tāne, who can no longer fly free. He then makes nets, and traps the children of Tangaroa. He makes holes to dig the ground, capturing his brothers Rongo-mā-Tāne and Haumia-tiketike, heaping them into baskets to be eaten. Of all the children of Ranginui and Papatūānuku, Tāwhirimātea fought Tūmatauenga to a standstill and forced him to withdraw, making him the only brother that Tūmatauenga cannot subdue completely, whose storms and hurricanes attack humankind to this day because of his indignation at the actions of his brothers.

Although Ranginui and Papatūānuku were not human in form, Tūmatauenga and his brothers were. Humankind – the descendants of Tūmatauenga – increased upon the earth, until the generation of Māui and his brothers.

Tūmatauenga's actions against his brothers provide a pattern for human activities. Because Tūmatauenga defeated his brothers, people can now, if they perform the appropriate rituals, kill and eat birds (the children of Tāne), fish (the children of Tangaroa), cultivate and harvest plants for food (the children of Rongo-mā-Tāne and Haumia-tiketike), and generally harness the resources of the natural world. Tūmatauenga is also the originator of warfare, and people make war now because Tūmatauenga provided the example. When rituals were performed over warriors before a battle, or when an infant was dedicated to a future role as a fighter, Tūmatauenga was invoked as the source of their duty. The body of the first warrior to fall in a battle was often offered up to Tūmatauenga. While Tūmatauenga is the origin of war, powerful local deities such as Kahukura, Maru, or Uenuku were also called upon during times of war.

== In popular culture ==
A song by Alien Weaponry, "Kai Tangata" (eat people), from the album Tū constantly refers to Tūmatauenga, as the god of war; cannibalism was a part of warfare for the Māori. Kai tangata also referred to the people eaters – taua or groups of men tasked with fighting and gathering food. In addition, Kaitangata was a mortal who was taught how to fish.

== See also ==
- Kū
- Maru
- Uenuku
