= Rehua =

Māori deity

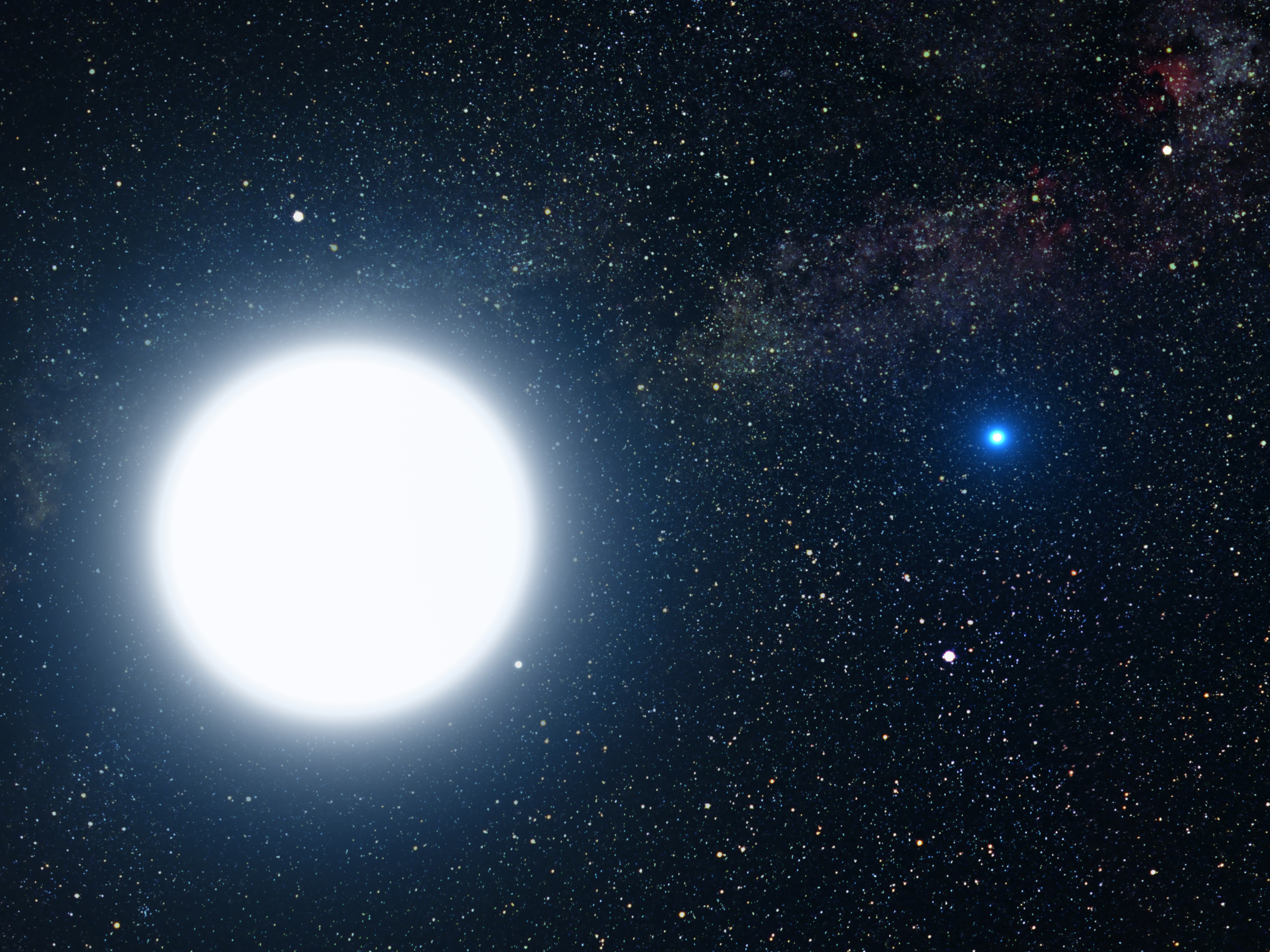
The star Sirius

In Māori mythology, Rehua is a very sacred personage, who lives in Te Putahi-nui-o-Rehua in Rangi-tuarea, the tenth and highest of the heavens in some versions of Māori lore. Rehua is identified with certain stars. To the Tūhoe people of the North Island he is Antares. Others say he is Betelgeuse, or Sirius. Because he lives in the highest of the skies, Rehua is untouched by death, and has the power to cure blindness, revive the dead, and heal any disease (Orbell 1998:119-120). He is a son of Rangi and Papa, and the father of Kaitangata, as well as the ancestor of Māui (Tregear 1891:381). A Ngāi Tahu legend from the South Island speaks of Rehua as the eldest son of Rangi and Papa, who first manifested as lightning, but assumed a human shape when he travelled into the skies. Later his brother Tāne went to pay him a visit, Rehua had birds in his hair, feeding on his lice. Rehua had his servants cook and prepare the birds as a meal for Tāne, who was shocked and declined to eat them because the birds had eaten the lice from Rehua's head, which was extremely tapu (sacred). However Rehua gave him birds to bring down to this world, and showed him how to snare them. Tāne also brought with him the fruit trees that the birds fed on, and so it is that there are forests and birds on the earth (Orbell 1998:119).

In Tahiti, Rehua was a star-god, the star of the New Year, who produced the Twins as well as the Pleiades, and was considered the lord of the year.
