= Tangaroa =

Māori sea and water body god

- Māori atua of sea and fish, Cook Islander god of sea and fertility Moriori god of fish
- Other names: Tangaroa-whakamau-tai, Takaroa
- Gender: Male
- Region: Polynesia
- Ethnic group: Māori, Cook Islands Māori, Moriori

Genealogy
- Parents: Ranginui and Papatūānuku; Kāi Tahu: Temoretu
- Siblings: Haumia-tiketike, Whiro, Rongo-mā-Tāne, Tāne Mahuta, Tāwhirimātea, Tūmatauenga, Rūaumoko
- Consorts: Te Anu-matao; Kāi Tahu: Papatūānuku
- Offspring: Punga, Tinirau, and 9 daughters

Tangaroa (Māori; Takaroa in the South Island dialect; cognate with Tagaloa in Sāmoan) is a god (atua) in Māori mythology. A god of creation in Polynesian tradition, he is considered the god of the sea, lakes, rivers, and creatures that live within them, especially fish. In the Cook Islands, Tangaroa is usually depicted as a male human-like figure with a swollen belly and a prominent genital organ, symbolising his role as fertility god.

As Tangaroa-whakamau-tai, he exercises control over the tides.

In other places, he is sometimes depicted as a whale.

In Manihiki, he is the fire deity that Māui steals from (which elsewhere in Māori mythology is instead Mahuika, a goddess of fire).

== Māori traditions ==
Tangaroa - detail from a Cook Islands 3-dollar banknote (2021 series)

Tangaroa is son of Ranginui and Papatūānuku, Sky and Earth. After joining his brothers Rongo, Tū, Haumia, and Tāne in the forcible separation of their parents, he is attacked by his brother Tāwhirimātea, the atua of storms, and forced to hide in the sea. (Note: In the traditions of the Taranaki, it is Tangaroa who forcibly separates Rangi and Papa from each other. In the traditions of most other regions of New Zealand, Rangi and Papa were separated by Tāne, atua of the tree.)

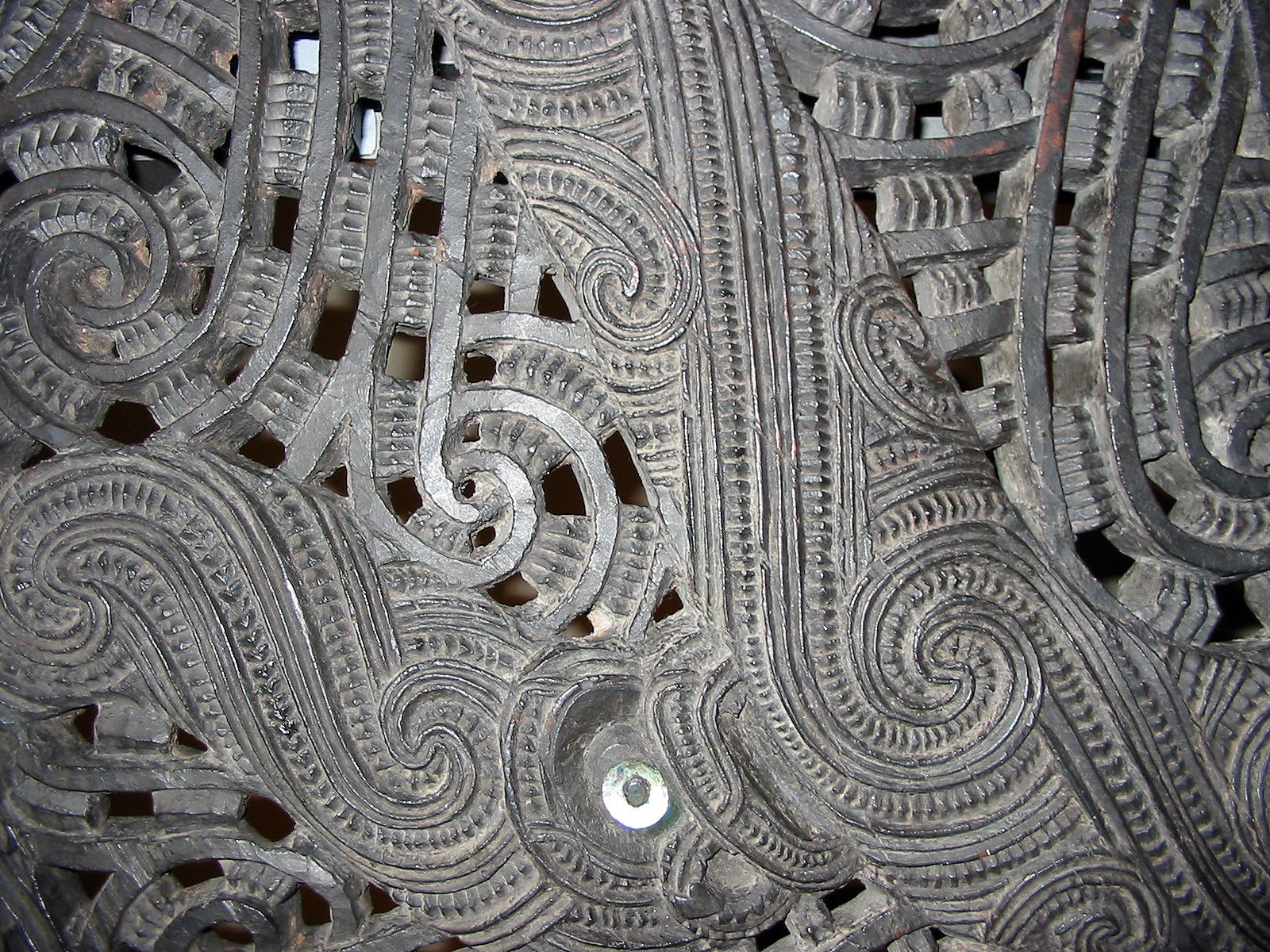
A carving on a Māori war canoe. As Tangaroa was the god (atua) of the sea, it was important to offer him before setting out for travel or fishing.

Tangaroa is the father of many sea creatures. Tangaroa's son, Punga, has two children, Ikatere, the ancestor of fish, and Tū-te-wehiwehi (or Tū-te-wanawana), the ancestor of reptiles. Terrified by Tāwhirimātea's onslaught, the fish seek shelter in the sea and the reptiles in the forests. Ever since, Tangaroa has held a grudge with Tāne Mahuta, the atua of forests, because he offers refuge to his runaway children.

The contention between Tangaroa and Tāne Mahuta, the father of birds, trees, and humans, is an indication that the Māori thought of the ocean and the land as opposed realms. When people go out to sea to fish or to travel, they are, in effect, representatives of Tāne Mahuta, entering the realm of Tāne Mahuta's enemy. For this reason, offerings need to be made to Tangaroa before any such expedition.

The Kāi Tahu version of the origin of Takaroa maintains that he is the son of Temoretu and that Papatūānuku is his wife. Papatūānuku commits adultery with Rakinui while Takaroa is away, and in the resulting battle on the beach, Takaroa's spear pierces Rakinui through both his thighs. Papatūānuku then marries Rakinui.

In another legend, Tangaroa marries Te Anu-matao (chilling cold). They are the parents of the atua ‘of the fish class’, including Te Whata-uira-a-Tangawa, Te Whatukura, Poutini, and Te Pounamu. In some versions, Tangaroa has a son, Tinirau, and nine daughters.

== Cook Islands ==
- In Rarotonga, Tangaroa is god of the sea and fertility. He is the most important of all the departmental gods. Carved figures made from wood carvings are very popular on the island today.
- In Mangaia, Tangaroa is a child of Vatea (daylight) and Papa (foundation) and the younger twin brother of Rongo. Rongo and Tangaroa share food and fish: Tangaroa's share is everything red (the red taro, red fish and so on). Tangaroa is said to have yellow hair, and when Mangaians first saw Europeans, they thought they must be Tangaroa's children.
- In Manihiki, Tangaroa is the origin of fire. Māui goes to him to obtain fire for humankind. Advised to reach Tangaroa's abode by taking the common path, he takes the forbidden path of death, infuriating Tangaroa, who tries to kick him to death. Māui manages to prevent that and insists that Tangaroa give him fire. Māui kills Tangaroa. When his parents are horrified, Māui uses incantations to bring him back to life.

== Moriori ==
In the mythology of the Moriori of the Chatham Islands, Tangaroa is a fish atua alongside Pou.

== Elsewhere ==
=== Polynesia ===
Tangaloa is one of the oldest Polynesian deities. In Western Polynesian traditions such as Samoa and Tonga, Tangaloa is considered the supreme and creator deity. In Eastern Polynesian cultures, however, he is usually considered of equal status to Tāne and thus not supreme.

- In Rapa Nui tradition, Taŋaroa was killed at the bay of Hotu-iti and was buried in the surrounding area.
- In Ra'iātea, a legend reported by Professor Friedrich Ratzel in 1896 gave a picture of the Tahitian god Taʼaroa's all-pervading power.
- In Hawaiʻi, the god of ocean, healing, and long travels is called Kanaloa, the cognate term in the Hawaiian language
- In Sāmoa, the god Tagaloa is the almighty sky-father deity, the creator of the universe.
- In the Marquesas Islands, the equivalent deities are Tana'oa or Taka'oa.
- In the Rennell and Bellona Islands in the southern Solomon Islands, Tangagoa is a sea god who stayed on the coastal cliff of East Rennell known as Toho and flew in the night with a flame in the sky. Tangagoa was believed to take the spirits of the dead, so the sparkling fire would be seen at night when someone was near death. Some can still recall when this god appeared in the night as a flame in the sky, and there are many tales of it. Tangagoa started disappearing in the 1970s and early 1980s when Christian missionaries visited the cliff and reportedly 'cast' him out.

=== Melanesia ===
A legendary figure named Takaro (spelled Tagaro in Raga and Ambae languages) is also featured in the Melanesian cultures of northeastern Vanuatu. In the beliefs of northern Pentecost, Tagaro appears as a destructive trickster, while in other areas, he is an eternal creator figure, and names cognate with Tagaro (such as Apma Takaa and Ske Tegar) are applied nowadays to God in Christianity. In the Banks Islands, words related to takaro frequently refer to a supernatural force.

There are also religious terms in Vanuatu languages, such as Apma dangro 'pray' and Mota taŋaro 'offering to a ghost' and taŋaroa 'magic stone possessed by a spirit', that are directly cognate with Tangaroa.

It has been suggested that the similarity in name between Takaro and Tangaroa provides evidence of contact between Polynesians and northern Vanuatu. However, Takaro appears to have deep roots in traditional Vanuatu religion, and any connection with Tangaroa is likely due to Melanesian and Polynesian religious terminology having common ancient Proto-Oceanic roots.

== See also ==
- Kanaloa, Hawaiian religion
- RV Tangaroa, a New Zealand research vessel
- Taʼaroa, Tahitian religion
- Tagaloa, Samoan religion
- Tagroa Siria, Rotuman religion
- Tangaloa
