= Haumia-tiketike =

Māori god of uncultivated vegetative food

- Atua of all wild food plants
- Other names: Haumia, Haumia-roa, Haumia-tikitiki
- Gender: Male
- Region: New Zealand
- Ethnic group: Māori

Genealogy
- Parents: Arawa: Ranginui and Papatūānuku Kāi Tahu: Tamanuiaraki Some others: Tāne Mahuta
- Siblings: Arawa: Rongo-mā-Tāne, Tāne Mahuta, Tangaroa, Tāwhirimātea, Tūmatauenga, Kāi Tahu: Manuika, Manunuiakahoe, Huawaiwai, Tahitokuru, Kohurere, Teaohiawe, Haere, Uenukupokaia, Uenukuhorea, Rakiwhitikina, Te Pukitonga
- Offspring: Te Mōnehu

Haumia-tiketike (or simply Haumia) (Note: The name Haumia also belongs to a taniwha from the Manukau Harbour, or the Waikato River. There is yet another Haumia recorded as the ancestress of Paikea. A fourth Haumia is the ancestor to Ngāti Haumia, a hapū of Ngāti Toa which should not be confused with another Ngāti Haumia hapū from Taranaki. In addition, Mount Brewster's Māori name may have been inspired after Haumia-tiketike.) is the god of all uncultivated vegetative food in Māori mythology. He is particularly associated with the starchy rhizome of the Pteridium esculentum, (Note: Elsdon Best in his book, Maori Religion and Mythology Part 1, wrote that the Māori ate the rhizomes of Pteris aquilina, which is Pteridium aquilinum.) which became a major element of the Māori diet in former times. He contrasts with Rongo, the god of kūmara and all cultivated food plants.

In different tribal and regional variations of the stories involving him, he is often portrayed as the son or grandson of Ranginui. He is frequently associated with Arawa traditions of the world's creation, in which he agreed to and attempted the separation of Rangi from his wife Papa.

== Arawa creation myth ==
After Haumia agreed to Rangi and Papa's forced separation in order to allow light and space into the world between them, he was the third child to attempt to push them apart with his arms. Despite Tāne being the one to successfully carry out the task, Haumia's involvement meant he was subjected to the fury of their brother, Tāwhirimātea, god of the winds and storms, who would have killed him if their mother had not hidden him and their brother Rongo-mā-Tāne under her bosom – that is, in the ground.

While they had successfully escaped Tāwhirimātea's stormy wrath, they were later discovered by Tūmatauenga (god of war, here representing humankind) who felt betrayed that he was left to fend against Tāwhirimātea by himself, so when he saw Rongo-mā-Tāne's and Haumia-tiketike's hair and descendants (all represented by leaves) sticking up out of the earth he harvested them with a wooden hoe and devoured them in revenge.

== Genealogy ==
Many of these relatives may not be considered atua as gods or greater spirits themselves but may instead be atua as lesser spirits. The translations of their names represent abstract concepts and aspects of nature, not unlike polytheistic deities.

=== Parentage ===
- Haumia-tiketike is a son of Ranginui and Papatūānuku, according to the tribes of the Arawa.
- Elsdon Best noted that Haumia-tiketike was not recognised as a son of Ranginui and Papatūānuku by the tribes of the Tākitimu.
- In Kāi Tahu (an iwi associated with Tākitimu) traditions, Haumia-tiketike is a son of Tamanuiaraki ('Great son of heaven'), who is a son of Rakinui and Hekehekeipapa ('Descend at the world').
- In the southern Bay of Plenty and parts of the east coast Haumia-tiketike is a son of Tāne Mahuta, who is the son of Ranginui and Papatūānuku. This is an area of origin for most Tākitimu iwi.

=== Siblings ===
==== Arawa ====
- Rongo-mā-Tāne, god of cultivated foods, particularly kūmara.
- Tāne Mahuta, god of forests and birds.
- Tangaroa, god of the sea and fish.
- Tāwhirimātea, god of storms and violent weather.
- Tūmatauenga, god of war, hunting, cooking, fishing, and food cultivation.

==== Ngāi Tahu ====
In Kāi Tahu's traditions and likely those of other iwi of Tākitimu, gods typically considered as Haumia-tiketike's brothers such as Rongo-mā-Tāne and Tāne Mahuta are instead his uncles or half-uncles.

Haumia-tiketike being listed first, Tamanuiaraki's other offspring included:

- Manuika ('Bird fish')
- Manunuiakahoe ('Power/Shelter of the rowers')
- Huawaiwai ('Pulpy fruit')
- Tahitokuru ('Ancient blow')
- Kohurere ('Flying mist')
- Teaohiawe ('Gloom day')
- Haere ('Go/Proceed')
- Uenukupokaia ('Trembling earth, go all around/encircle')
- Uenukuhorea ('Trembling earth, bald')
- Rakiwhitikina ('Heaven encircled with a belt')
- Te Pukitonga ('The fountain/origin at the south')
- "and so on to the generation of men now living."

=== Descendants ===
- Te Mōnehu (fern spores, tomentum) is the child of Haumia-tiketike, its descendants are:
  - Namu (sandflies) – Namuiria was the first sandfly, killed by Tūmatauenga.
  - Waeroa (mosquitoes)
  - Rō (stick insects)
  - Aruhe (fern root)

== God of uncultivated food plants ==
=== Bracken ===
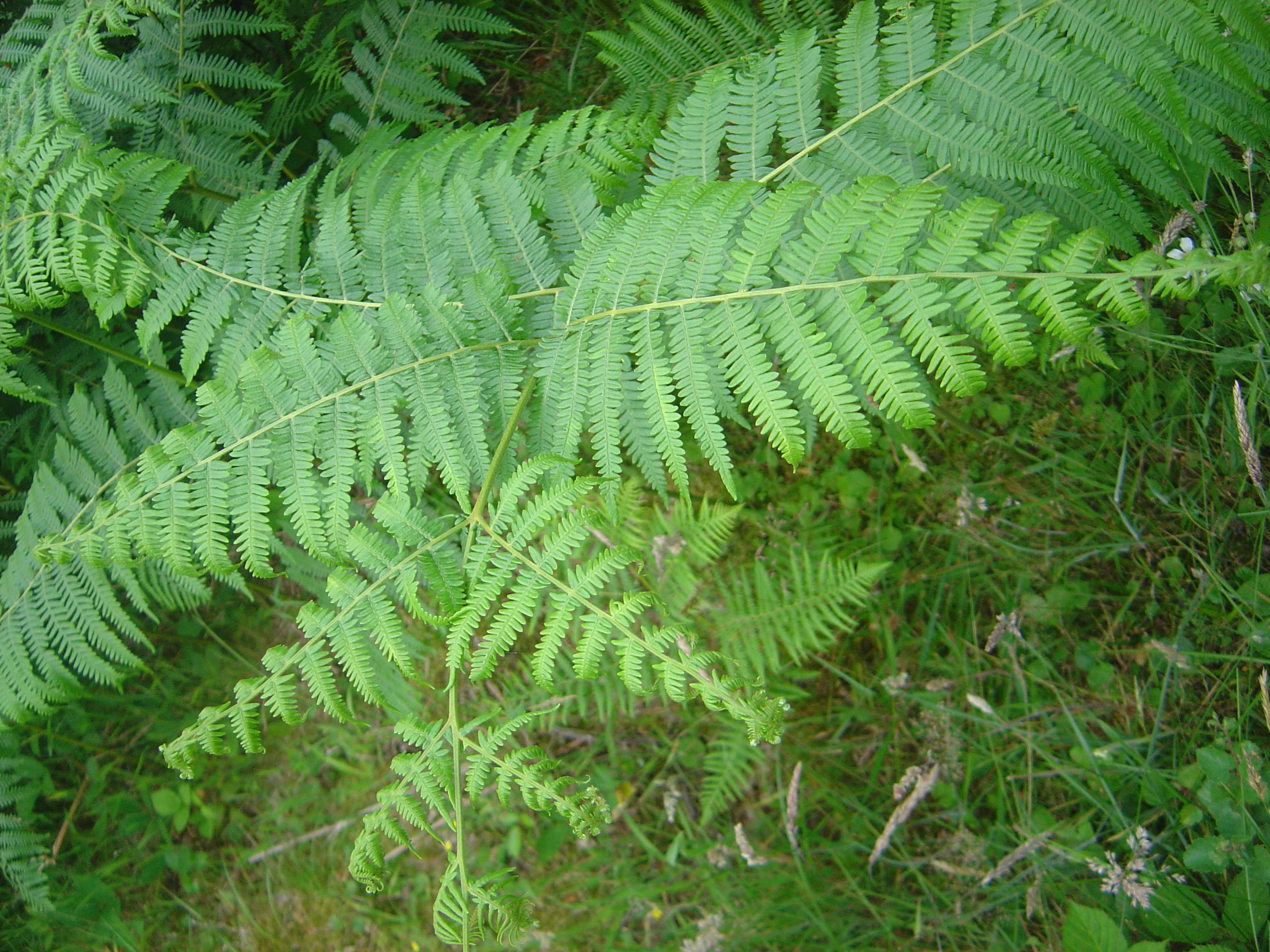
Haumia-tiketike is the deity associated with wild plants such as the bracken fern.

Food-quality rhizomes (aruhe) were only obtained from the Pteridium esculentum bracken (rarauwhe) growing in deep, moderately fertile soils. Bracken became abundant after the arrival of Māori, "mainly a result of burning to create open landscapes for access and ease of travel". Rhizomes were dug in early summer and then dried for use in the winter. Although it was not liked as much as kūmara, it was appreciated for its ready availability and the ease with which it could be stored.

The rhizomes were air-dried so that they could be stored and become lighter. When ready for consumption, they were briefly heated and then softened with a patu aruhe (rhizome pounder); the starch could then be sucked from the fibres, or collected to be prepared for a larger feast. Several distinct styles of patu aruhe were developed.

The plants of the bracken genus (Pteridium) contain the known carcinogen ptaquiloside, identified to be responsible for haemorrhagic disease, as well as esophageal cancer, and gastric cancer in humans.

=== Other plants ===
A handful of other native plants from across New Zealand that are recorded as traditionally being used for food by Māori include:

- Cordyline australis – Tīkōuka, the shoots and roots could be cooked and eaten, or used to make a sweet beverage.
- Coriaria arborea – Tutu, the juices were extracted from the berries and petals, and could be used to sweeten fernroot, or boiled with seaweed to make a black jelly.
- Cyathodes juniperina – Mingimingi, edible berries.
- Dacrycarpus dacrydioides – Kahikatea, edible berries, and could apparently be used to make beer.
- Dacrydium cupressinum – Rimu, edible berries.
- Gaultheria antipoda – Tāwiniwini, edible berries.
- Leucopogon fasciculatus – Mingimingi, edible berries.
- Lobelia angulata – Pānakenake, the leaves were cooked and eaten as greens.
- Metrosideros excelsa – Pōhutukawa, a thin layer of honey was collected from the flowers.
- Muehlenbeckia australis – Puka, edible berries.

== See also ==
- Haumea, a Hawaiian goddess of fertility and childbirth
