= Savea =

Savea is a Samoan name. Notable people with the name include:

- Ardie Savea (born 1993), New Zealand rugby union player
- Julian Savea (born 1990), New Zealand rugby union player
- Savea Sano Malifa, Samoan poet and journalist
