= Māori mythology =

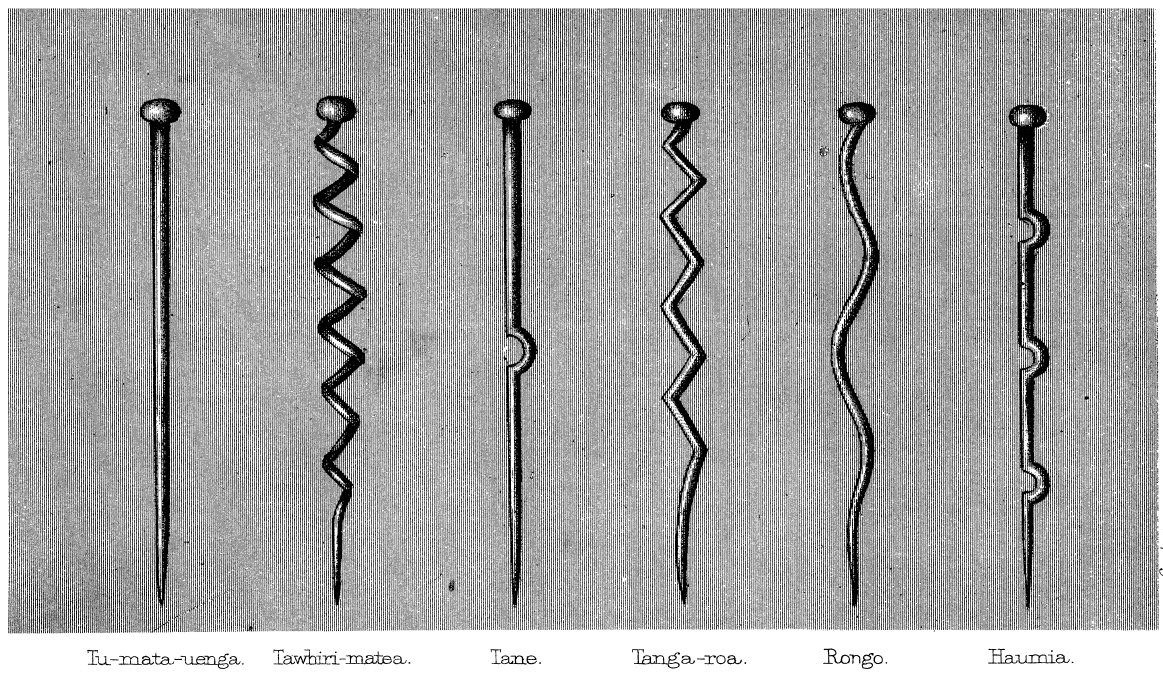
Six major departmental atua represented by wooden godsticks: left to right, Tūmatauenga, Tāwhirimātea, Tāne Mahuta, Tangaroa, Rongo-mā-Tāne, and Haumia-tiketike

Māori mythology and Māori traditions are two types of New Zealand Māori oral history regarding the remote past. Māori myths are tales of supernatural events relating to the origins of the observable world for the pre-European Māori, often involving gods and demigods. Māori traditions are more folkloric legends, often involving historical or semi-historical forebears. Both categories merge in whakapapa to explain the overall origin of Māori and their connections to the world in which they lived.

Māori did not have a writing system before European contact, beginning in 1769, therefore they relied on oral retellings and recitations memorised from generation to generation. The three forms of expression prominent in Māori and Polynesian oral literature are genealogical recital, poetry, and narrative prose. Experts in these subjects were broadly known as tohunga.

The rituals, beliefs, and general worldview of Māori society were ultimately based on an elaborate mythology that had been inherited from a Polynesian homeland (Hawaiki) and adapted and developed in the new setting. Alongside different Polynesian cultures having different versions of a given tradition, often the same story for a character, event, or object will have many different variations for every iwi, hapū, or individual who retells it, meaning there is never a fixed or 'correct' version of any particular story.

== Sources ==
=== Oral forms ===
==== Genealogical recital ====
The reciting of genealogies (whakapapa) was particularly well developed in Māori oral literature, where it served several functions in the recounting of tradition. Firstly it served to provide a kind of time scale which unified all Māori mythology, tradition, and history, from the distant past to the present. It linked living people to the gods and the legendary heroes. By quoting appropriate genealogical lines, a narrator emphasised his or her connection with the characters whose deeds were being described, and that connection also proved that the narrator had the right to speak of them.

==== Prose narrative ====
Prose narrative forms the great bulk of Māori legendary material. Some appear to have been sacred or esoteric, but many of the legends were well-known stories told as entertainment in the long nights of winter.

Nevertheless, they should not be regarded simply as fairy tales to be enjoyed only as stories. The Maui myth, for example, was important not only as entertainment but also because it embodied the beliefs of the people concerning such things as the origin of fire, of death, and of the land in which they lived. The ritual chants concerning firemaking, fishing, death, and so on made reference to Maui and derived their power from such reference.

— Bruce Grandison Biggs, Maori Myths and Traditions (1966)

==== Poetry and song ====
Māori poetry was always sung or chanted; musical rhythms rather than linguistic devices served to distinguish it from prose. Rhyme or assonance were not devices used by Māori; only when a given text is sung or chanted will the metre become apparent. The lines are indicated by features of the music. The language of poetry tends to differ stylistically from prose. Typical features of poetic diction are the use of synonyms or contrastive opposites, and the repetition of key words.

Archaic words are common, including many which have lost any specific meaning and acquired a religious mystique. Abbreviated, sometimes cryptic utterances and the use of certain grammatical constructions not found in prose are also common.

— Bruce Grandison Biggs, Maori Myths and Traditions (1966)

=== 19th-century writings ===
==== Missionaries ====
Few records survive of the extensive body of Māori mythology and tradition from the early years of European contact. The missionaries had the best opportunity to get the information, but failed to do so at first, in part because their knowledge of the language was imperfect. Most of the missionaries who did master the language were unsympathetic to Māori beliefs, regarding them as 'puerile beliefs', or even 'works of the devil'. Exceptions to this general rule were Johan Wohlers of the South Island, (Note: Wohler's work is presented in Christine Tremewan's Traditional Stories from Southern New Zealand: He Kōrero nō Te Wai Pounamu (Macmillan Brown Centre for Pacific Studies: Christchurch), 2002.) Richard Taylor, who worked in the Taranaki and Wanganui River areas, and William Colenso who lived at the Bay of Islands and also in Hawke's Bay. Their writings are valuable as some of the best sources for the legends of the areas where they worked.

==== Non-missionary collectors ====
In the 1840s Edward Shortland, Sir George Grey, Te Rangikāheke, and other non-missionaries began to collect the myths and traditions. At that time many Māori were literate in their own language and the material collected was, in general, written by Māori themselves in the same style as they spoke. The new medium seems to have had minimal effect on the style and content of the stories. Genealogies, songs, and narratives were written out in full, just as if they were being recited or sung. Many of these early manuscripts have been published, and as of 2012 scholars have access to a great body of material (more than for any other area of the Pacific) containing multiple versions of the great myth cycles known in the rest of Polynesia, as well as of the local traditions pertaining only to New Zealand. A great deal of the best material is found in two books, Nga Mahi a nga Tupuna (The Deeds of the Ancestors), collected by Sir George Grey and translated as Polynesian Mythology; and Ancient History of the Māori (six volumes), edited by John White. (Note: Later scholars, however, have been critical of the editing methods used by these collectors, especially Grey, particularly for editing various regions' stories together to make a general overall version in his work.)

The earliest full account of the genealogies of atua and the first humans was recorded from Ngāti Rangiwewehi's Wī Maihi Te Rangikāheke in Nga Tama a Rangi (The Sons of Heaven), in 1849. (Note: Grey published an edited version of Te Rangikāheke's story in Nga Mahi a Nga Tupuna, and translated it into English as Polynesian Mythology.)

== Myths ==
Myths are set in the remote past and their content often have to do with the supernatural. They present Māori ideas about the creation of the universe and the origins of gods (atua) and people. The mythology accounts for natural phenomena, the weather, the stars and the moon, the fish of the sea, the birds of the forest, and the forests themselves. Much of the culturally institutioned behaviour of the people finds its sanctions in myth, such as opening ceremonies performed at dawn to reflect the coming of light into the world.

The Māori understanding of the development of the universe was expressed in genealogical form. These genealogies appear in many versions, in which several symbolic themes constantly recur. The cosmogonic genealogies are usually brought to a close by the two names Rangi and Papa (sky father and earth mother). The marriage of this celestial pair produced the gods and, in due course, all the living things of the earth.

The main corpus of Māori mythology are represented as unfolding in three story complexes or cycles, which include the world's origin, the stories of the demigod Māui, and the Tāwhaki myths.

=== Creation ===
==== Dawn of the universe ====
In one generalised telling of the universe's creation: in the beginning, there was Te Kore (The Nothing; Void) which became Te Korematua (The Parentless Void) in its search for procreation. From it came Te Pō (The Night), becoming Te Pōroa (The Long Night), and then becoming Te Pōnui (The Great Night). Gradually Te Ao (The Light) glimmered into existence, stretching to all corners of the universe to become Te Aotūroa (The Long-Standing Light). Next came Te Ata (The Dawn), from which came Te Mākū (The Moisture), and Mahoranuiatea (Cloud of the Dawn). Te Mākū and Mahoranuiatea wed to form Rangi.

In other versions the evolution of the universe is likened to a tree, with its base, tap roots, branching roots, and root hairs. Another theme likens evolution to the development of a child in the womb, as in the sequence "the seeking, the searching, the conception, the growth, the feeling, the thought, the mind, the desire, the knowledge, the form, the quickening". Some, or all, of these themes, may appear in the same genealogy.

— Bruce Grandison Biggs, Maori Myths and Traditions (1966)

==== Earth's creation ====
Generally, the wife of Rangi is Papa, though they are known throughout Polynesia, even when they're not considered spouses. The pair laid in a tight embrace which blocked light from touching the world. From them came the children Haumia, Rongo, Tāwhiri, Tangaroa, Tū, and Tāne. Some traditions may list some of these children alongside Rehua, Urutengangana, Aituā, Tiki, Whiro, or Rūaumoko, among others. Often, a war or skirmish between the siblings ends with them becoming the ancestors of certain concepts, habitats, mannerisms, animals, tools, or plants that they each represent. For instance Tāne became Tāne Mahuta, the father of birds and the forest, and Tū became Tūmatauenga, the father of humanity and its activities, such as war. Sometimes, Tāne Mahuta ascends to the sky after Ranginui to dress him with stars, who mourns for his wife every time it rains. Similarly, Papatūānuku strains in an effort to reach the sky, causing earthquakes, and the mist comes from her sighing.

In a version involving Urutengangana, Whiro, Tāwhiri, Tangaroa, Tuamatua, Tumatakaka, Tū, Paia, and Tāne; Tāwhiri "finally" agreed to the separation, while Whiro was against it. Tāne instructed Tumatakaka and Tū to fetch axes with which to cut off the arms of Rangi, and the blood that dripped from him down onto Papatūānuku is said to be where the red sunset now comes from, as well as the origin of the colours red and blue in painting: red oxide and blue phosphate of iron. This is very different to the telling in which Tāne discards the suggestions of Tū to slaughter the parents to ensure their separation, where Tāwhiri is the brother most upset by the idea to separate the parents at all.

In South Island traditions, Rakinui weds at least three wives including Papatūānuku. Poharuatepō is one of the wives of Rakinui, and they are the parents of Aoraki. In these versions, the gods that are usually considered the children of Rakinui may become the half-siblings of each other, some even becoming the grandsons of Rakinui.

==== South Island's creation ====
Aoraki and his brothers Rakiora, Rakirua, and Rarakiroa travelled across the waters of the ocean to visit the new wife of Rakinui – Papatūānuku. On the return journey, their canoe (waka) became capsized on a reef, so they climbed atop its hull to escape drowning. They froze into stone, becoming the tallest peaks of the Southern Alps. Afterwards they were discovered by Tūterakiwhānoa who enlisted Kahukura's help in shaping and clothing the land. Hence Te Waka o Aoraki became the South Island.

In a slight variant, Aoraki and his grandfather Kirikirikatata landed at Shag Point aboard the Āraiteuru, where they turned into the ever-associated mountain and range. Kirikirikatata persuaded Aroarokaehe to come sit with them there, while her husband Mauka Atua became a peak on the Ben Ōhau Range.

==== Origin of humans ====
There are many mythologies that describe the creation of humankind. Though Tūmatauenga is the major god associated with humanity and its activities, humanity's creation is sometimes credited to Tāne Mahuta, (Note: Tāne is the Māori word for man.) and often involves Tiki. In one story, Tāne Mahuta abandoned his wife Rangahore, for only giving birth to a stone.

One such legend of humanity's origins is which Tāne Mahuta created the first woman, Hineahuone, from soil and with her became the father of Hinetītama. Tāne Mahuta concealed the parentage of Hinetītama to her, and together they had children. Upon the realisation that he is her father, she flees to the underworld and renames herself to Hinenuitepō, becoming the goddess (atua) of night, death, and the underworld, where she receives the souls of their descendants. A similar story tells how Tiki found the first woman in a pool, imagined through his reflection and birthed into reality by covering the pool with dirt. She later became excited by the sight of an eel, passing on the excitement to Tiki and resulting in the first reproductive act.

Other versions say either Tāne Mahuta or Tūmatauenga created Tiki as the first man. In Ngāti Hau traditions, Mārikoriko is said to be the original woman created by Ārohirohi with Paoro's help. After seducing Tiki, she gave birth to Hinekauataata.

=== The exploits of Māui ===
==== The sun is slowed ====
In the days of old Tamanuiterā, the sun, used to move through the sky at much too fast a pace for humanity to complete all their days' chores leaving long, cold nights that lasted for many hours while Tamanuiterā slept. Māui and his brothers journeyed to the sleeping pit of Tamanuiterā with a large rope, which in some tellings was made from their sister Hina's hair. The brothers fashioned the rope into a noose or net, and in doing so "discovered the mode of plaiting flax into stout square-shaped ropes, (tuamaka); and the manner of plaiting flat ropes, (pāharahara); and of spinning round ropes", which when Tamanuiterā awoke found himself caught in. Using a patu made from the jawbone of their grandmother, Murirangawhenua, Māui beat the sun into agreeing to slow down and give the world more time during the day.

==== North and South Islands ====
In south Westland, Kāti Māhaki ki Makaawhio's Te Tauraka Waka a Māui Marae is named in honour of the tradition stating that Māui landed his canoe in Bruce Bay when he arrived in New Zealand.

In a tale collected from a Kāi Tahu woman of Lake Ellesmere / Te Waihora, Māui threw a giant to the ocean and then buried him beneath a mountain at Banks Peninsula. The next winter, the giant remained still underneath the mountain, but stirred during summer, which caused the land to split and form Akaroa Harbour. Māui would continue to pile earth on top of the giant, and the giant would continue to stir every summer, creating a lake and Pigeon Bay in the process, until finally the giant could not move anymore.

The brothers of Māui constantly shunned him, and so never allowed him to join their fishing trips. One day he managed to sneak out to the waters with them by hiding in their canoe. Once they were far out to sea he revealed himself and used the jawbone of Murirangawhenua, now fashioned into a fishing hook, to catch fish. Since his brothers would not allow him to use their bait, he pierced his nose with the hook and used his blood instead. Soon, Māui caught hold of a giant fish said to be a gift from Murirangawhenua, which he successfully hauled up to the surface of the ocean, the canoe getting caught atop Mount Hikurangi which according to Ngāti Porou, is still there. Māui went to examine his catch, and have it blessed by priests from Hawaiki, trusting his brothers to look after it. Out of jealousy though, the brothers took to beating the fish and cutting it open, carving out the mountains and valleys of what would become Te Ika-a-Māui, the North Island. Te Waka a Māui, the South Island, likewise was the name of the canoe of Māui, Stewart Island was Te Punga a Māui, the anchor stone of Māui, and Cape Kidnappers became Te Matau-a-Māui, the fish hook of Māui.

==== Fire is brought to humanity ====
One night, Māui put out all the fires in his village, out of a curiosity to learn where it actually comes from. His mother Taranga, the village's rangatira, sent Māui to his grandmother Mahuika, the atua of fire, to retrieve more. She gave him a fingernail, but he extinguished it, so she kept giving him fingernails until she became furious with him, setting fire to the land and sea to attack Māui. He transformed into a kāhu to escape, but the fire singed the underside of his wings, turning them red. He talked to his ancestors Tāwhirimātea and Whaitirimatakataka to send rain to extinguish the fire. Mahuika threw her last nail at Māui, which missed and set fire to the kaikōmako, tōtara, patete, pukatea, and māhoe trees; the dried sticks of the māhoe were brought back by Māui to show his people how to make fire for themselves.

==== Hina and Tinirau ====
Māui turned the husband of Hina, Irawaru, into the first dog (kurī) after a dispute they had during a fishing trip. Once they reached the shore Māui crushed Irawaru underneath the canoe, breaking his back and stretching out his limbs, turning him into a dog. Upon learning of this, Hina threw herself to the ocean. Instead of drowning, she was carried across the waves to Motutapu, where she became the wife of Chief Tinirau, son of Tangaroa. She took on the name Hinauri to reflect her mood since Māui changed Irawaru.

With Tinirau, Hina became the mother of Tūhuruhuru. The tohunga, Kae, performed the baptism ritual for the child, and so Tinirau allowed Kae to ride his pet whale (possibly a taniwha), Tutunui, in order to return home. This proved to be a mistake on the part of Tinirau, as despite his strict instructions to the contrary, Kae rode Tutunui into shallow water where he became stranded and died. Kae and his people then used the whale's flesh for food. Hinarau and a party of women put Kae to sleep with a magical lullaby and brought him back to Motutapu. After he woke he was taunted and killed. This broke out into a war, a notable event of which Whakatau assisted Tinirau in burning his enemies.

In a South Island variant of that myth, Tinirau and Tutunui met Kae who was in a canoe. Kae borrowed Tutunui, and Tinirau borrowed a nautilus from his friend Tautini in a continued search for Hineteiwaiwa. When Tinirau smells the wind he realises Tutunui is being roasted.

In a very different variant, Hina was the wife of Māui. Over a period of time where Hina visited a bathing pool Te Tunaroa, the father of eels, molested Hina. As revenge, Māui cut the body of Te Tunaroa into bits, throwing them into different habitats where they became different kinds of fish; conger eels, freshwater eels, lampreys, and hagfish.

==== Failure to conquer death ====
One day Māui followed his mother to the underworld in search of his father, Makeatutara, who mistakenly performed the baptismal rituals for the birth of Māui improperly, making it certain that he would die, so Māui decided to overcome death by facing his ancestress Hinenuitepō. Makeatutara instructs that she can be seen as the red flashes of sunset. His companions vary from version to version, usually being either his brothers or a group of small birds. To defeat Hinenuitepō, Māui had to crawl through her vagina in the form of a worm, and climb out through her mouth. Unfortunately, one of his brothers, or one of the birds named Pīwakawaka, bursts out into laughter at the sight of Māui beginning the task which wakes Hinenuitepō, who crushes him with the obsidian and pounamu teeth between her thighs.

In one rare tradition, Māui swapped faces with his wife Rohe against her will, out of jealousy that she was much prettier while he was ugly. She left to the underworld in anger, becoming the atua of night and death. The spirits of those who pass through her realm of Te Urangaoterā may get beaten by her. Māui and Rohe's child was Rangihore, the atua of rocks and stones.

=== Tāwhaki complex ===
==== Cannibalism and the effects of tapu ====
Whaitiri, a cannibalistic atua of thunder and a granddaughter of Māui, married the mortal Kaitangata (Eat people) believing, as his name suggested, that he too was a cannibal. After she killed her favourite slave for him, she was disappointed to learn that he is instead a kind man, who was horrified at the flesh offering. His diet consisted of fish instead, but Whaitiri grew tired of eating fish, and so killed the relatives of Kaitangata. When he returned from a fishing trip she asked him to perform the chants that are used to offer flesh to the gods, but he did not know any such chants. After eating, she turned his relatives' bones into barbed fish hooks for Kaitangata to use, with which he caught a few hāpuku. She ate the fish, which had become infused with tapu from the hooks, and as a result she was gradually blinded. Later she was insulted by her husband when he remarked at her strange nature, so she revealed that she is 'thunder' from the sky, and returned there.

==== Life of Tāwhaki ====
The son of Whaitiri Hemā had been killed by the ponaturi. His sons, Tāwhaki and Karihi, made an ascent into the sky, where they found Whaitiri, who had since become fully blinded. Her only food consisted of kūmara and taro. She reveals to her grandsons how to climb further into the heavens but, in some versions, Karihi falls to his death.

While they were in the sky, Tāwhaki met his wife, either Tangotango or Hinepiripiri. In the version with Tangotango, the couple quarrel and she returns to heaven. There's another version where Tāwhaki was entirely human, and offended his wife Tangotango (daughter of Whaitiri), prompting her to return to the sky. In order to find her he meets his blind ancestress Matakerepō, who helps him climb further.

The brothers managed to save their mother, and together they trapped the ponaturi in their house and blocked off all potential sources of light or escape. Their mother explained that sunlight could kill the ponaturi, so the three tricked the ponaturi into believing it was still night, and then suddenly lit the building on fire, and tore the door off. Only two ponaturi survived; Tongahiti and Kanae.

A son named Wahieroa was born to Tāwhaki and Hinepiripiri, so named because after an attack on Tāwhaki, Hinepiripiri warmed him by the fire, with firewood. Alternatively, the people of Tāwhaki were too lazy to collect firewood for their village, so Tāwhaki collected it himself and threw it to the ground, startling the people. Wahieroa would marry Matoka-rau-tāwhiri, who when pregnant had a craving for tūī flesh, and so asked her Wahieroa to kill tūī for her to eat. In journeying through the forest, Wahieroa is captured and killed by the ogre Matuku-tangotango.

==== Life of Rātā ====
Rātā, the son of Wahieroa and Hinepiripiri, set out to avenge his father's death. How he killed Matoka-rau-tāwhiri is dependent on where the tale is told, but, he won in the end, and used the ogre's bones to make spears. He soon found out though, that Wahieroa's bones were lying with the old enemies of Tāwhaki, the ponaturi.

In order to get to the ponaturi, Rātā had to build a canoe. Rātā set about chopping down the tree for his canoe, cutting the top away, and went home after the day's work was over. The next day, he found the tree standing upright as if it had never been touched. He repeated the task of chopping it, and the next day it was again re-erected. He decided to hide in a nearby bush for the night to understand what was happening, and discovered that his work was being undone by the birdlike hākuturi spirits, who explained that he didn't perform the correct rituals and thus his attempts to fell the tree were an insult to Tāne Mahuta. With expressing regret, the hākuturi constructed his canoe for him.

While rescuing the bones of Wahieroa, Rātā overheard the ponaturi singing a song called Titikura while banging the bones together. He killed the priests and later used the song to turn the tides of a losing battle against them. In a flash, the dead of the people of Rātā returned to life and slaughtered the ponaturi in their thousands.

The sons of Rātā by Tonga-rau-tawhiri were Tūwhakararo and Whakatau. In other accounts, their parents were Tūhuruhuru and Apakura. In other accounts still, Apakura as the wife of Tūwhakararo wife threw an apron or girdle into the ocean, which a deity named Rongotakawhiu turned into Whakatau. The boy was taught a handful of magical secrets by the deity, and he was capable of living under the sea. As the brother of Whakatau, Tūwhakararo had been murdered by the Āti Hāpai (or Raeroa) tribe, so the former avenged him by gathering an army and slaughtering the offending tribe. This is one event that was said to trigger migrations from Hawaiki.

== Traditions ==
Every Māori social group had its own body of traditional belief which validated its claims to the territory it occupied, gave authority to those of high rank, and justified the group's external relationships with other groups. These purposes were served because the members of the groups concerned believed that the traditions were true records of past events, and they acted accordingly. Alliances between groups were facilitated if it was believed that they shared a common heritage, and the commoner's respect for and fear of his chief were based, in part at least, on his belief in the semi-divine ancestry of those of high rank.

— Bruce Grandison Biggs, Maori Myths and Traditions (1966)

Traditions, as opposed to myths, tell of incidents which are for the most part humanly possible. Genealogical links with the present place them within the past millennium. They are geographically located in New Zealand and knowledge of them is confined to this country.

— Bruce Grandison Biggs, Maori Myths and Traditions (1966)

=== Discovery or origin traditions ===
The South Island's earliest iwi, Waitaha, traces its ancestors back to the Uruaokapuarangi, captained by Rākaihautū who sailed from Te Patunuioāio to New Zealand with the tohunga kōkōrangi (astronomer) the advice of Matiti, and in mythology was credited with digging many of the island's great lakes and waterways. The Kapakitua is sometimes said to have arrived at a similar time, bringing the progenators of Ngāti Hawea – an iwi that became absorbed into Waitaha. Similar ancient groups that have slipped into mythology might include Maero and Rapuwai.

Toi (Toi-kai-rākau; Toi-the-wood-eater) is the traditional origin ancestor of the tribes of the east coast of the North Island. Their traditions make no mention of his coming to New Zealand, and the inference is that he was born there. Ngāi Tūhoe say that 'ancestor' of Toi, Tīwakawaka was the first to settle the country aboard Te Aratauwhāiti, "but only his name is remembered". (Note: Tīwakawaka is also a Māori name for the fantail.) A man named Kahukura would take the canoe of Toi, the Horouta and return to Hawaiki with it. He sent kūmara back to the new lands with the canoe, which in Ngāti Kahungunu traditions was accompanied by Kiwa, who later sailed around to Gisborne and became the first man there.

According to the iwi of North Auckland and the west coast of the North Island, Kupe sailed to New Zealand in the Matahourua from Hawaiki after murdering a man called Hoturapa, and making off with his wife, Kūrāmarotini. Traditional songs recount the travels of Kupe along the coast of New Zealand. In Ngāpuhi tradition, he brought the first three dogs and sent them to Cape Reinga with a few men to guard the passage to the afterlife, who would become the Ngāti Kurī. The exploration of Kupe of Marlborough had been impeded by Te Kāhui Tipua, frequently described as a tribe of ogres or giants that arrived with Rākaihautū. Kupe managed to kill Te Kāhui Tipua by creating Lake Grassmere and drowning their villages. He sailed back to Hawaiki and never came back to the land he discovered. However, others came to New Zealand according to his directions.

Ngahue, a contemporary of Kupe, sailed to New Zealand in his canoe, the Tāwhirirangi. While there he killed a moa and discovered pounamu. After returning to Hawaiki, Ngahue helped build the Arawa using adzes made from the pounamu.

Patupaiarehe were credited with being the source of fishing nets and flax weaving. There are at least two traditions regarding this: In one story, another man named Kahukura happened across the patupaiarehe pulling in their nets during the night, and offered to help them. When they realised he was a mortal, they fled from him. In another story of the Hauraki Māori, a patupaiarehe named Hinerehia from the Moehau Range married a mortal man. She only weaved during the night, and so was tricked into weaving past dawn. Upset by this, she travelled within a cloud back to her mountains, where her laments can still be heard under heavy fog.

=== Migration and settlement traditions ===
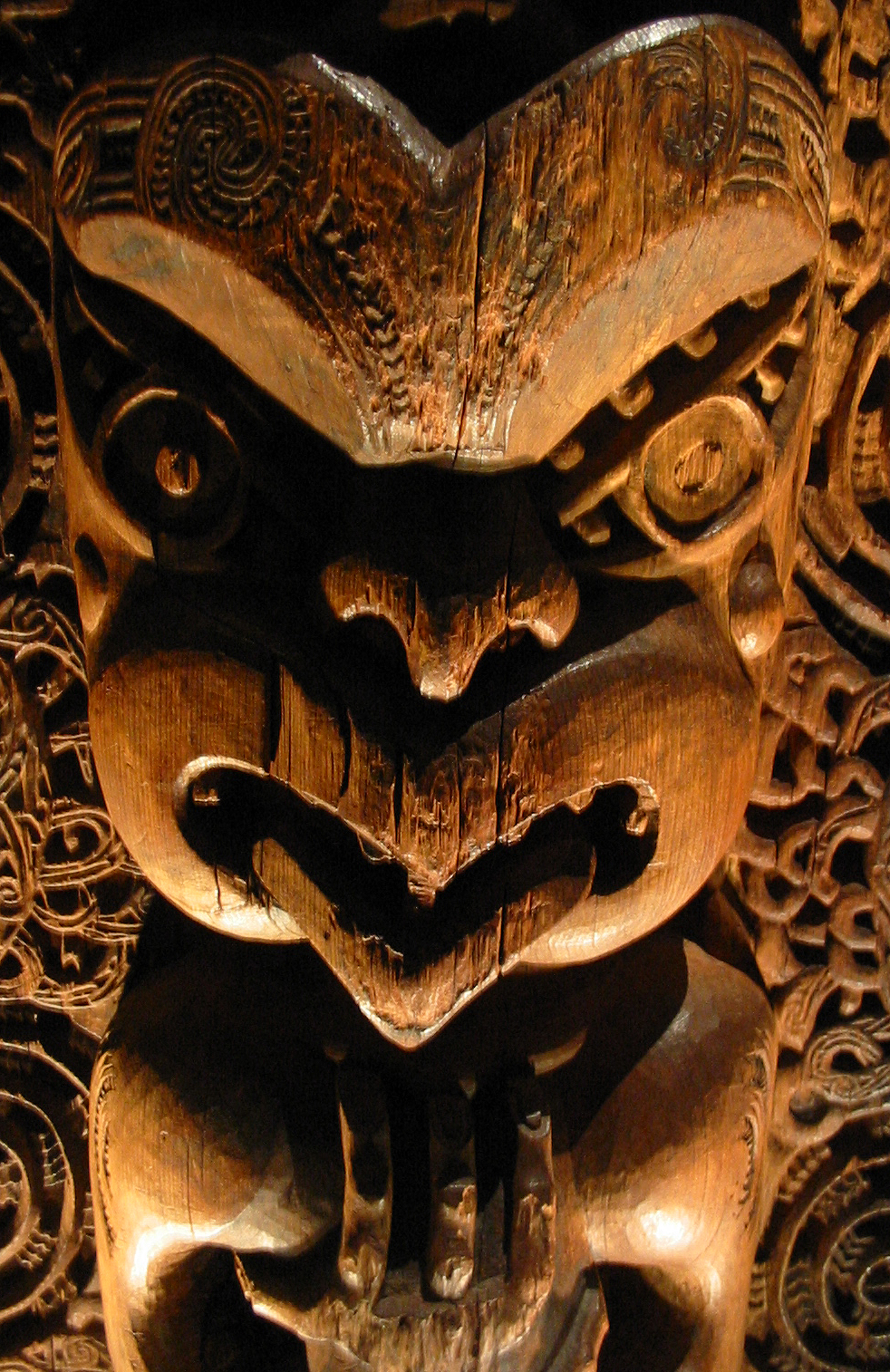
Detail from a ridgepole (tāhūhū) in a Ngāti Awa wharenui. Believed to represent one of two ancestors: Tūwharetoa or Kahungunu.

Migration traditions are numerous, and often only pertain to small areas and to small groups of iwi.

- Ngāti Porou and Ngāi Tahu trace their founders' ancestor as Paikea, who rode a whale from Hawaiki after his brother Ruatapu attempted to kill him.
- In the North Island, the Aotea and Tainui canoes are both prominent, where the latter's Ngāpuhi has the largest affiliation of any iwi. Ngāti Rārua in the northern South Island also identify with the Tainui. The captain of the Arawa (Tamatekapua) was confronted by the captain of the Tainui when they each reached the North Island.
- Most recent iwi inhabiting the South Island, especially in the north, including Kāti Māmoe, Ngāti Tūmatakōkiri, and Rangitāne, are descendants of the Kurahaupō. The canoe is also known in the North Island.
- The Mātaatua and Nukutere are both prominent canoes of the Bay of Plenty. Iwi associated with them include Ngāpuhi, Ngāi Tūhoe, Ngāti Awa, Whakatōhea, and Ngāti Porou.
- Tākitimu is a prominent canoe which Ngāti Kahungunu are much associated with. Tamatea Arikinui (chief of Hawaiki), one Kahukura, and Tahupōtiki have been associated with captaining it.

A deifed person, or persons, named Uenuku features with certain roles in some canoes' migration stories. Often he is an ariki of Hawaiki who serves as a catalyst for disputes, which end with the migrations to New Zealand. The name Uenuku also belongs to one or more atua associated with rainbows and war; depending on the telling, he was either a mortal who was visited by a mistmaiden from the heavens and then turned into a rainbow to be with her after tricking her into staying in his house past dawn, or he was a spirit who visited the wife of Tamatea Arikinui night after night and impregnated her. Te Uenuku is a Tainui artefact associated with the rainbow entity.

=== Local traditions ===
Each tribal group, whether iwi or hapū, maintained its discrete traditional record, which generally concerned "great battles and great men"; these stories were linked together by genealogy, which in Māori tradition is an elaborate art. Hapū were often named after a notable ancestor from the wider iwi; the name of the iwi itself was often borrowed from a founding ancestor. Sometimes, a group was named after a particular event.

==== North Island ====
After the arrival of the Arawa in the Bay of Plenty, its people dispersed outwards and towards Lake Taupō. From the canoe, a separate Waitaha iwi evolved. Descendants of the canoe's priest Ngātoro-i-rangi, Ngāti Tūwharetoa, began attacking the local Ngāti Hotu and Ngāti Ruakopiri, and drove them from Lake Taupō and Lake Rotoaira. The Whanganui Māori would later drive them from Kakahi further into the King Country, after which they disappeared from history.

==== South Island ====
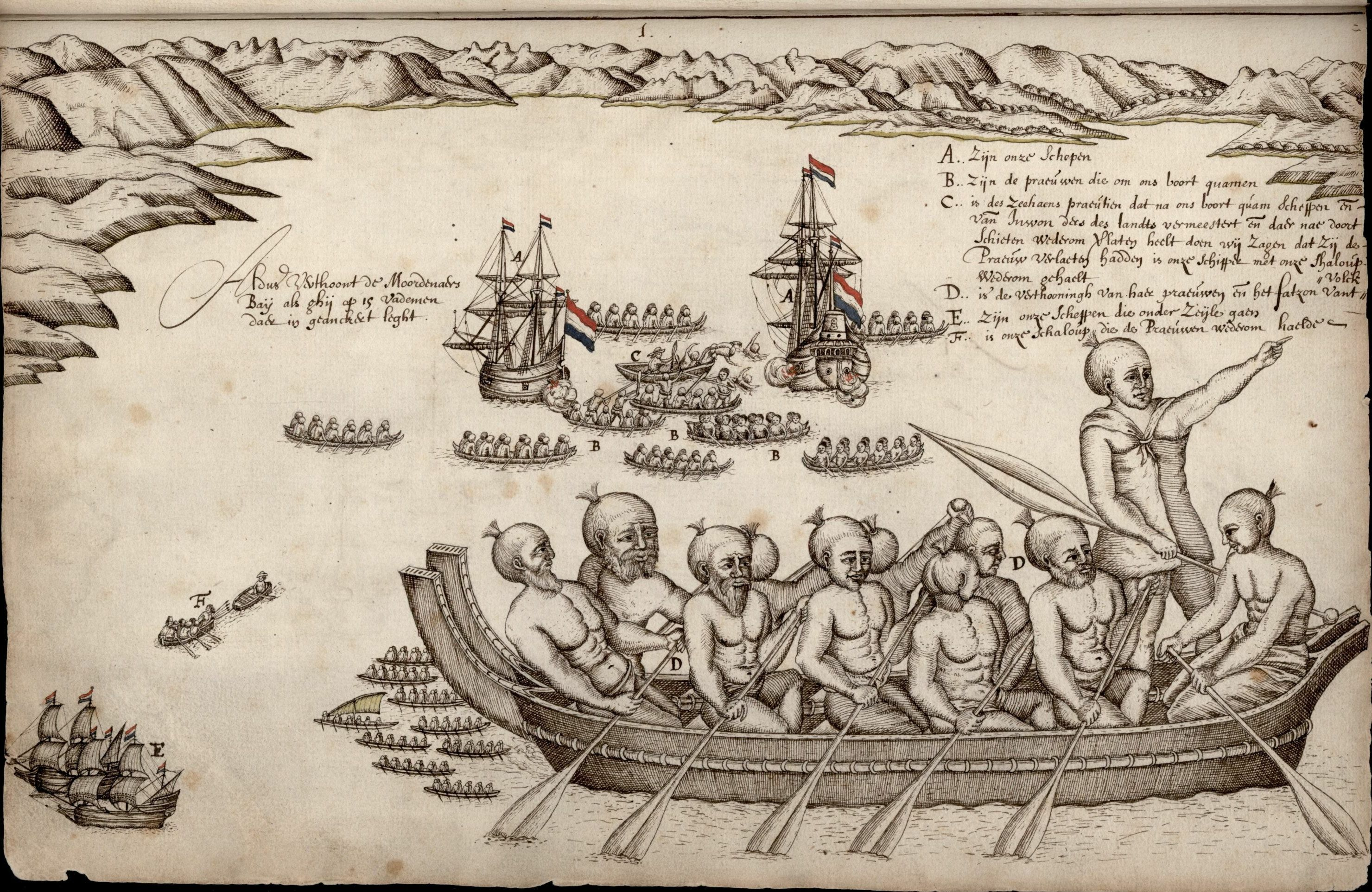
First European impression of (Ngāti Tūmatakōkiri) Māori, at Murderers' Bay, 1642.

Most of the greatest remembered traditions of the South Island are often told by or involve Kāti Māmoe, Ngāi Tara, Ngāti Wairangi, Ngāti Tūmatakōkiri, Ngāi Tahu, or Rangitāne; Waitaha was conquered and absorbed into Kāti Māmoe, which along with Ngāti Wairangi and Ngāti Tūmatakōkiri were conquered by Ngāi Tahu. Ngāti Tūmatakōkiri were additionally harassed by their brethren iwi Ngāti Kuia and Ngāti Apa.

Māori that clashed with Abel Tasman's crew at Golden Bay in December 1642 were of Ngāti Tūmatakōkiri, and it is sometimes theorised that Ngāti Tūmatakōkiri may have interpreted the Dutch as patupaiarehe. Another theory suggests that the iwi was concerned about the intruders possibly waking the taniwha Ngārara Huarau in anchoring too close to a certain point.

Some of the more memorable ancestors of Ngāi Tahu included;

- Husband and wife, Marukore and Tūhaitara who started a war with each other that drove their descendants out of the Hastings District.
- Pūraho, the Ngāti Kurī chief who initiated the migration to the South Island, and was killed in a war with Ngāi Tara.
- Tūteurutira, who mistakenly stole Hinerongo, one of the slaves of Rangitāne, Ngāti Māmoe, and became her husband after freeing her.
- Te Hikutawatawa, an illegitimate son who was almost cannibalised by his step-grandfather. Offended, Te Hikutawatawa destroyed his step-father's village and adopted the name Tūāhuriri (Sacred altar; to be angry). His wives were slain by Tūtekawa of Ngāti Māmoe.
- The sons of Pūraho and Tūāhuriri, Makōhakirikiri and Marukaitātea, and Moki and Tūrakautahi, conquered much of the island and led further battles against Kāti Māmoe, Ngāti Wairangi, and Ngāti Tūmatakōkiri. Moki for one was killed by a curse from two tohunga named Iriraki and Tautini.
- Tūhuru, the Ngāti Waewae chief who finally defeated Ngāti Wairangi in the Paparoa Range, and then settled his people at Greymouth.

One battle that Kāti Māmoe won against Ngāi Tahu was at Lowther under Tutemakohu, whose taua retreated to the mist after their victory. A Kāti Māmoe chief of Waiharakeke Pā named Te Whetuki was described as being "of strangely wild aspect", and covered in long hair. One tradition states that a group of Kāti Māmoe managed to escape an attack by forever disappearing into the forests on the other side of Lake Te Anau, the descendants of which were possibly sighted in the Hāwea / Bligh Sound by Captain Howell in 1843, and again in 1850/1 by Captain Stokes, and in 1872 by Kupa Haereroa at Lake Ada, and finally in 1882.

== Possible Christian influences ==
Io is a godly figure whose existence before European (specifically Christian European) arrival has been debated. He didn't appear in manuscripts or oral discourse until late in the 19th century. At least two references to him from 1891 appear in Edward Tregear's The Maori-Polynesian comparative dictionary, where he is described as "God, the Supreme Being", and as a figure in Moriori genealogy, but as the descendant of Tiki. A third reference might be found in the same book under the genealogy of Ngāti Maniapoto. It should also be noted that Io seems to be present in mythologies from Hawaiʻi, the Society Islands, and the Cook Islands.

In some versions of the story of Tāwhaki, he sends his people to a high place to escape a flood which he summons to drown the village of his jealous brothers-in-law. There is a suggestion that this story might have inspiration from the Genesis flood narrative, and Hemā is sometimes reimagined as Shem. The way George Grey recorded the myths of Tāwhaki in his 1854 Polynesian Mythology may have given rise to these connections:

[Tāwhaki] left the place where his faithless brothers-in-law lived, and went away taking all his own warriors and their families with him, and built a fortified village upon the top of a very lofty mountain, where he could easily protect himself; and they dwelt there. Then he called aloud to the Gods, his ancestors, for revenge, and they let the floods of heaven descend, and the earth was overwhelmed by the waters and all human beings perished, and the name given to that event was 'The overwhelming of the Mataaho,' and the whole of the race perished.

— Sir George Grey, Polynesian Mythology (1854)

Similarly, in the migration story where Ruatapu attempts to kill his brother Paikea, one Ngāti Porou tradition says that Ruatapu summoned great waves that destroyed their village, which Paikea only survived through the intervention of a goddess named Moakuramanu, and that Ruatapu then threatened to return as the great waves of the eighth month.

== Mythical beings ==
- Aitu
- Atua
- Nuku-mai-tore
- Pania
- Taniwha
- Te Wheke-a-Muturangi

== See also ==
- List of planetary features with Māori names
- Mana
