= Tāwhirimātea =

Māori wind god

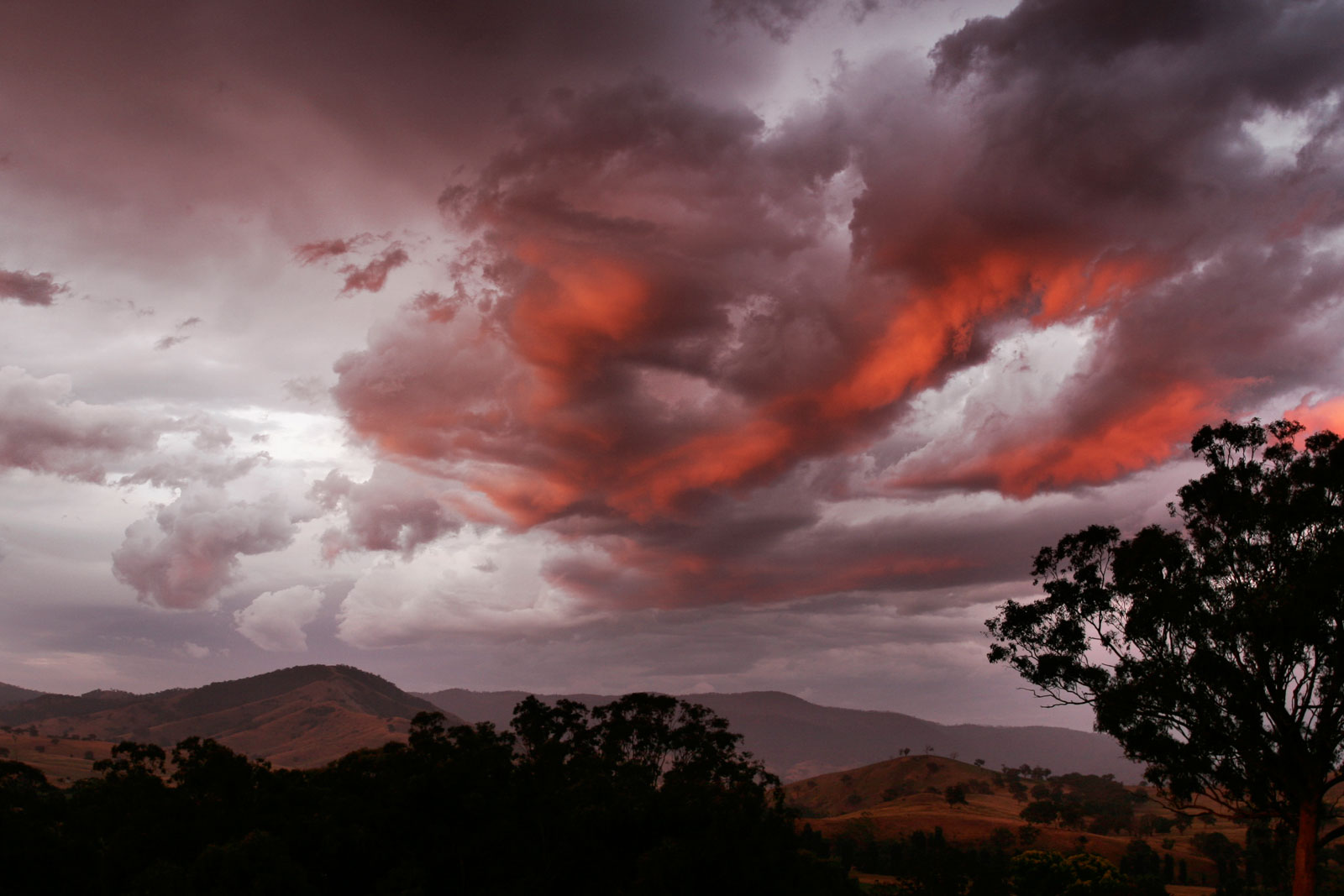
The clouds are children of Tāwhirimātea

In Māori mythology, Tāwhirimātea (or Tāwhiri) is the god of weather, including thunder and lightning, wind, clouds and storms. He is a son of Papatūānuku (earth mother) and Ranginui (sky father). Tāwhirimātea is the seventh oldest of 70 children, all of whom are boys. In his anger at his brothers for separating their parents, Tāwhirimātea destroyed the forests of Tāne (god of forests), drove Tangaroa (god of the sea) and his progeny into the sea, pursued Rongo and Haumia-tiketike till they had to take refuge in the bosom of their mother Papa, and only found in Tūmatauenga a worthy opponent and eternal enemy. To fight his brothers, Tāwhirimātea gathered an army of his children, winds and clouds of different kinds – including Apū-hau ("fierce squall"), Apū-matangi, Ao-nui, Ao-roa, Ao-pōuri, Ao-pōtango, Ao-whētuma, Ao-whekere, Ao-kāhiwahiwa, Ao-kānapanapa, Ao-pākinakina, Ao-pakarea, and Ao-tākawe. Grey translates these as 'fierce squalls, whirlwinds, dense clouds, massy clouds, dark clouds, gloomy thick clouds, fiery clouds, clouds which preceded hurricanes, clouds of fiery black, clouds reflecting glowing red light, clouds wildly drifting from all quarters and wildly bursting, clouds of thunder storms, and clouds hurriedly flying on'.

Other children of Tāwhirimātea are the various kinds of rain, mists and fog. Tāwhirimātea's attacks on his brothers led to the flooding of large areas of the land. The names of the beings involved in this flooding include Ua-nui (great rain), Ua-roa (long-continued rain), Ua-whatu (fierce hailstorms), and Ua-nganga (sleet); after these, their children in turn took up the fight: Hau-maringi (mist), Hau-marotoroto (heavy dew), and Tōmairangi (light mist). Tregear mentions Hau-maringiringi as a personification of mists.

Tāwhirimātea lives on the sky with his father Rangi and brother, the star Rehua.

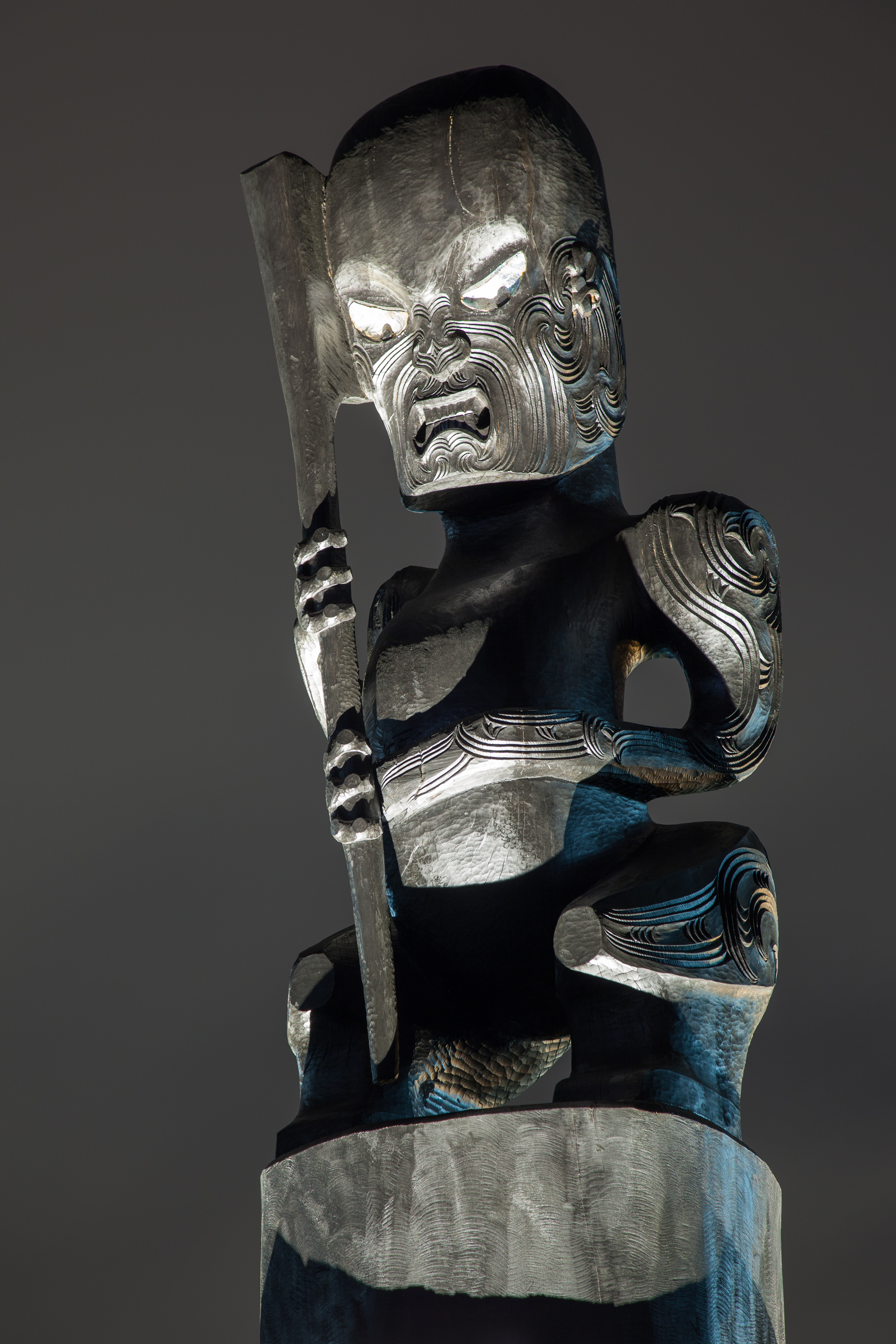
Statue of Tāwhirimātea

== The Divine War and Tāwhirimātea's conquest over his brothers ==
Eons ago, Rangi, the Sky Father, and Papa, the Earth Mother, were in an eternal embrace because of their love for each other. Their union gave rise to many powerful sons, who lived in between their parents.

As their sons grew up, they soon began to grow tired of living in a cramped up space, forever in darkness. One brother, Tūmatauenga, the God of War and Humans, suggested that they slay their parents. However, his brother, Tāne, the God of Forests, suggested that they separate their parents forever.

Except for Tāwhirimātea, all other brothers accepted the proposal. The brothers individually tried to separate their parents, but Tāne put his head on the earth and feet in the sky and pushed them apart.

Tāwhirimātea was enraged, as he saw it as a move to usurp his kingdom. So the god flew to the sky and communed with his father. Rangi reluctantly agreed to help his son wage a brutal war on his siblings. They were the spirits of winds, storms, and rain. Tāwhirimātea assembled his huge army and set out to conquer his brothers.

Tāwhirimātea first attacked Tāne, and razed his forests, causing Tāne to flee. Next, Tāwhirimātea attacked his brother, Tangaroa, the Sea God. He caused huge storms and waves, spreading panic in Tangaroa. Tangaroa was himself helpless before Tāwhirimātea, as the sea was in such a chaotic rage, harming all living beings. Having never seen such chaos at sea, many of Tangaroa's children deserted their father and took shelter with Tāne. Since then Tangaroa is at war with Tāne.

Tāwhirimātea pursued his brother, Rongo, and Haumia, the gods of cultivated and uncultivated food, but they were cleverly hidden by their mother, Papa, who still loved her children. Finally, Tāwhirimātea began to fight Tūmatauenga.

This time, however, Tūmatauenga firmly embedded his feet in the earth, saving him from Tāwhirimātea's storms. He cast spells, which turned the storms into gentle weather, suitable for humans. But neither brother could prevail against each other. Tāwhirimātea slowly withdrew.

To punish his brothers for cowardice, Tūmatauenga invented the arts of hunting, woodcutting, agriculture, cooking, and fishing, to subjugate their respective denizens as food for humans. However, Tūmatauenga and Tāwhirimātea still fight each other to this day. Another result of the war was that most of the land was submerged into the ocean, because of Tāwhirimātea causing heavy rains and thunderstorms. He was maybe the only brother out of all of them to want their parents together.

== See also ==
- Raka-maomao – a wind god
