= Tāne =

God of forests and of birds in Māori mythology

- Māori god of forests and birds, Tahitian god of beauty and peace
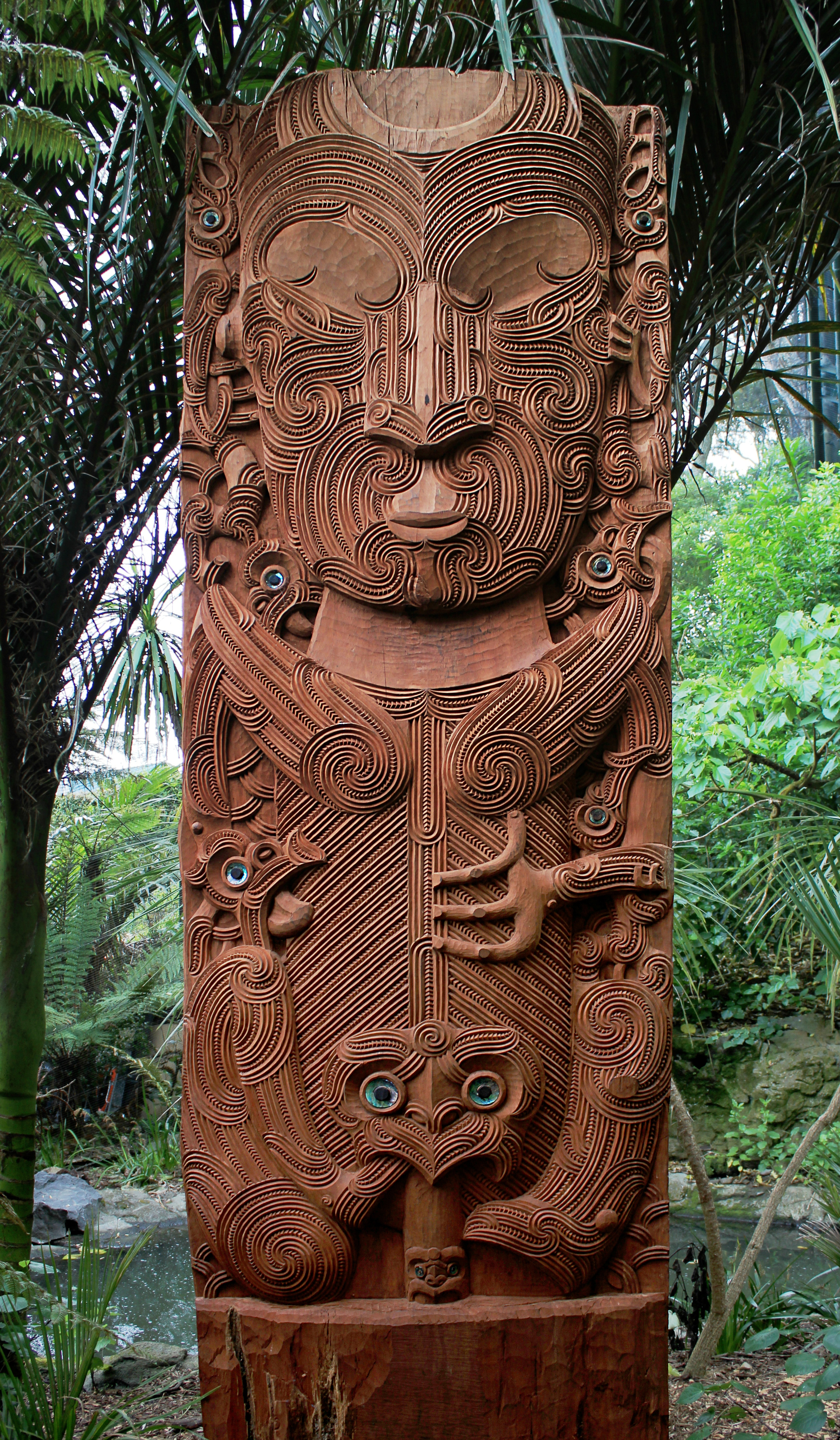
- A carving of Tāne-nui-a-Rangi sited at the entrance to the Auckland Zoo's forest aviary
- Other names: Tāne-mahuta, Tāne-nui-a-Rangi
- Gender: Male
- Region: Polynesia
- Ethnic group: Māori, Tahitians

Genealogy
- Parents: Rangi and Papa
- Siblings: Haumia (Arawa), Rongo, Tangaroa, Tāwhirimātea, Tū, Rūaumoko, Whiro
- Consorts: Hineahuone, Rangahore
- Offspring: Hine-nui-te-pō, Tiki, Haumia-tiketike (southern Bay of Plenty and parts of the east coast)

In Māori mythology, Tāne (also called Tāne-mahuta, Tāne-nui-a-Rangi, Tāne-te-waiora and several other names) is the god of forests and of birds, and the son of Ranginui and Papatūānuku, the sky father and the earth mother, who used to lie in a tight embrace where their many children lived in the darkness between them (Grey 1956:2).

On Tahiti, Tane was the god of peace and beauty.

== Separates his parents ==
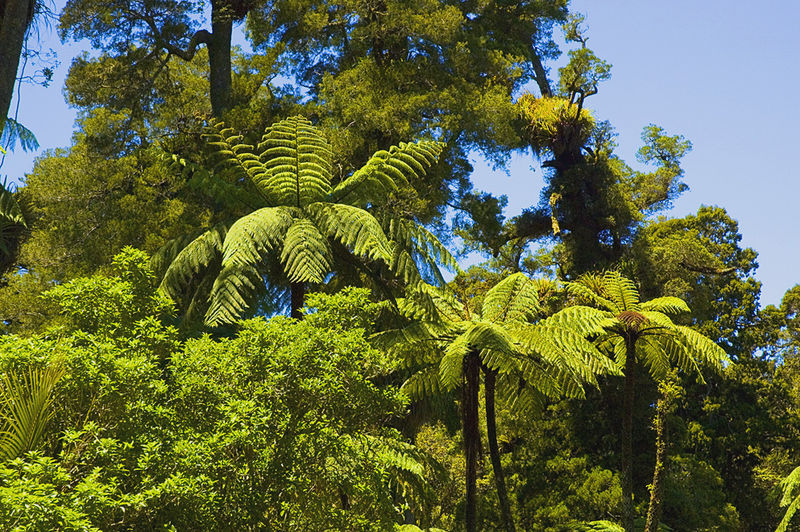
New Zealand rainforest: the trees and birds are the children of Tāne.

The children of Rangi and Papa grew frustrated at their confinement in the cramped space between their parents. Tū, future god of war, proposes that they should kill their parents. But Tāne (or Tāne-mahuta) disagrees, suggesting that it is better to separate them, sending Rangi into the sky and leaving Papa below to care for them. Tāne's brothers Rongo, then Tangaroa, Haumia-tiketike and Tū all try in vain to separate the parents. After many tries, Tāne lies on his back and pushes with his strong legs, and finally forces his parents apart, and Rangi rises high into the heavens (Grey 1956:2-3). Then Tāne searches for heavenly bodies as lights so that his father would be appropriately dressed. He obtains the stars and throws them up, along with the Moon and the Sun. At last Rangi looks handsome (Orbell 1998:145).

Tāwhirimātea, the god of storms and winds, is angry that the parents have been torn apart. He joins his father in the sky and punishes the earth and sea with violent storms (Grey 1956:3-6, Tregear 1891:54). Tāwhirimātea attacks the forests of Tāne, snapping the trunks of the trees, shattering the trees to the ground, leaving them as food for decay and insects. Then he attacks the oceans, and Tangaroa, the god of the sea, flees. Two of Tangaroa's descendants, Ikatere, father of fish and Tu-te-wehiwehi (or Tu-te-wanawana), the ancestor of reptiles, are terrified by Tāwhirimātea's fury. The fish flee into the sea, and the reptiles into the forests. Ever since, Tangaroa has resented Tāne for hiding his runaway children. So it is that Tāne supplies the descendants of Tūmatauenga with canoes, fishhooks, and nets to catch the descendants of Tangaroa. Tangaroa retaliates by overturning canoes and sending floods that sweep away houses, land and trees (Grey 1971:5-6).

== Progenitor of humankind ==
Some legends say that Tāne made the first man, named Tiki. More widely known is a tradition that Tāne was trying to find himself a wife, but at first he found only non-human females and fathered insects, birds, and plants. One such was Rangahore, who gave birth to a stone and was abandoned by Tāne. Then he made a woman by moulding her from the soil (Orbell 1998:145).

In some stories, Tāne marries his daughter Hine-tītama without her knowing who he is. Upon discovering that she has married her father, she flees to the underworld, and becomes the goddess of death, Hine-nui-te-pō. Tāne follows her and begs her to return. She tells him to return to the world and raise their children, while she will wait below to receive them when they die (Orbell 1998:38).

Other traditions tell of the three baskets of knowledge that Tāne brought down from the heavens (Orbell 1998:145).

== See also ==
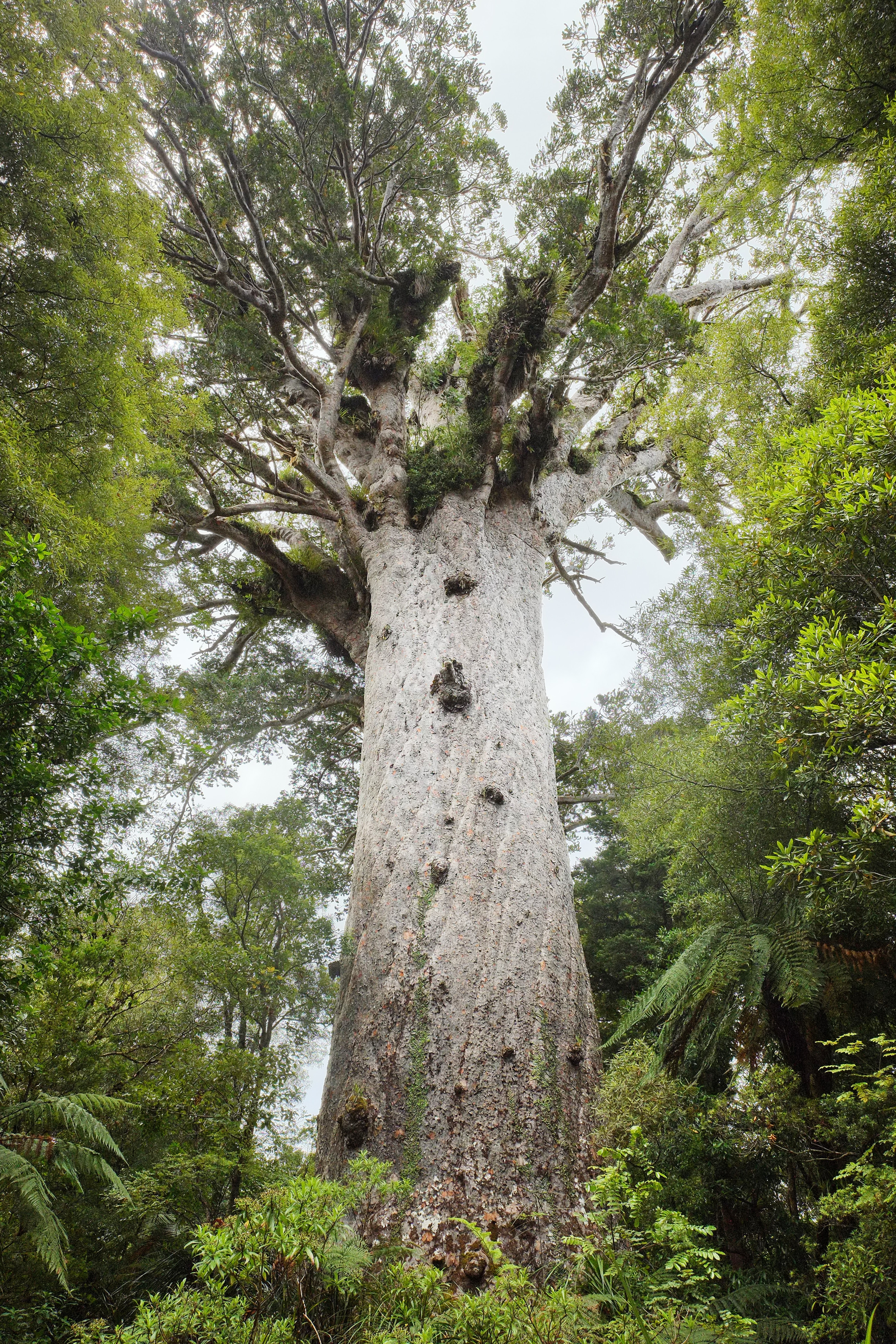
Tāne Mahuta, "Lord of the Forest", in the Waipoua forest

- Tāne Mahuta, a famous kauri tree
- Whirinaki Te Pua-a-Tāne, a prehistoric rainforest
- Kāne, a god of Hawaii
