= Rūaumoko =

Māori deity of earthquakes, volcanoes and seasons

- Māori Atua of Earthquakes, Volcanoes and Seasons
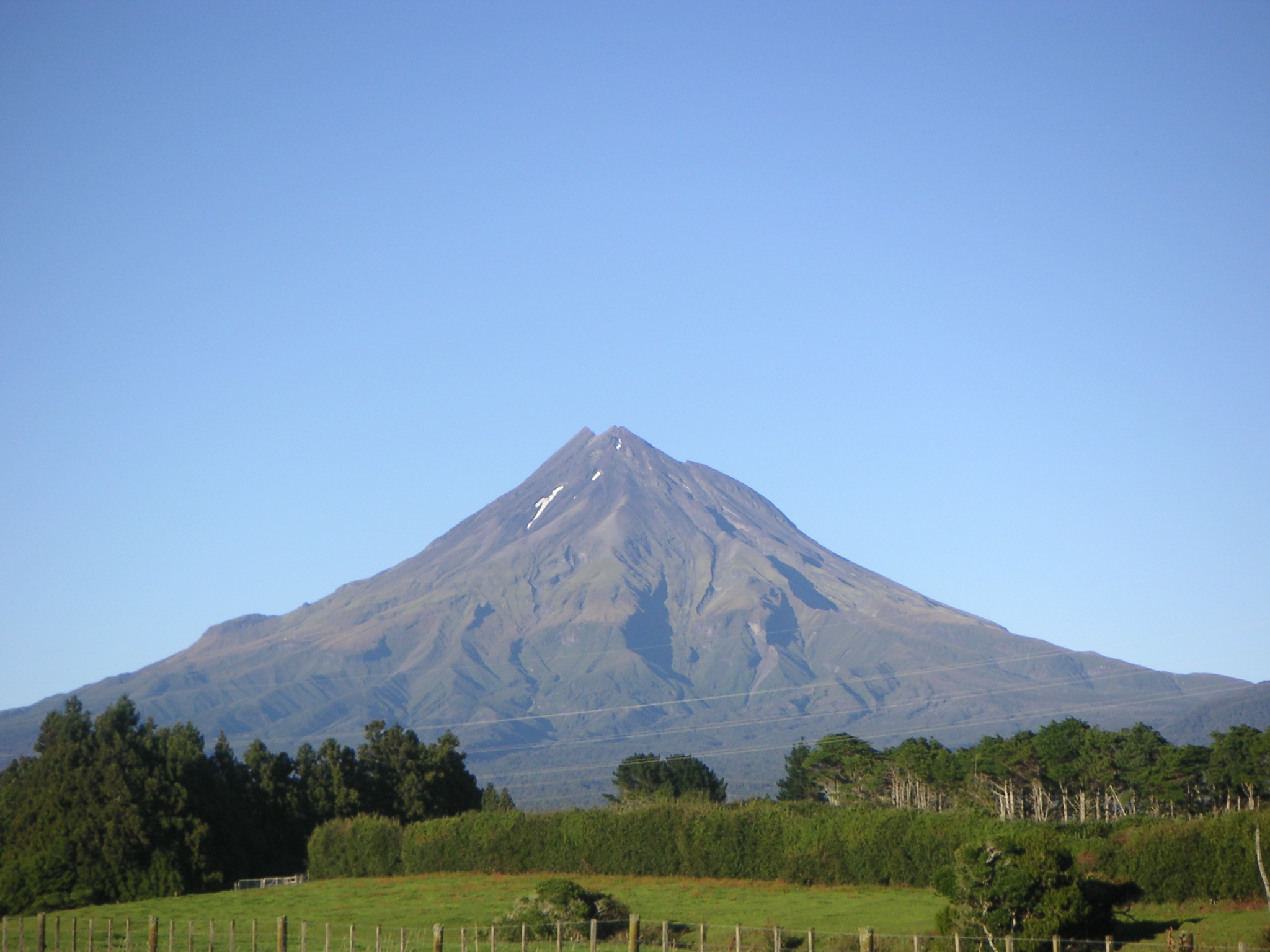
- Mount Taranaki, a volcano in New Zealand. Ruaumoko is believed to cause volcanoes and earthquakes.
- Gender: Male
- Region: Polynesia
- Ethnic group: Māori

Genealogy
- Parents: Ranginui and Papatūānuku
- Siblings: Mataaho

In Māori mythology, Rūaumoko (also known as Rūamoko) is the god of earthquakes, volcanoes and seasons. He is the youngest son of Ranginui (the Sky Father) and Papatūānuku (the Earth Mother). Māori mythology attributes earthquakes and volcanic activity to his movements and actions within the earth. Rūaumoko is believed to reside beneath the earth's surface, and his movements cause tremors and eruptions.

== Origin story ==
After Ranginui and Papatuanuku (the Sky Father and Earth Mother) were separated by their son Tāne Mahuta, Ranginui cried, and his tears drenched the land. To stop this, the sons decided to turn Papatuanuku face down, so Ranginui and Papatuanuku could no longer see each other's sorrow. Rūaumoko was at his mother's breast when this happened, so he was carried into the world below. He was given fire for warmth by Tama-kaka, and his movements below the earth cause earthquakes and volcanoes. Another version tells that he remains in Papatuanuku's womb, with some variants saying it was to keep Papatuanuku company after her separation from Ranginui. In these versions, his movements in the womb cause earthquakes.

The earthquakes Rūaumoko causes are in turn responsible for the change of seasons. Depending on the time of year, the earthquakes cause the warmth, or cold, of Papatuanuku to come to the surface of the land, resulting in the warming, or cooling of the Earth.

Rūaumoko pulls on the ropes that control the land causing the shimmering effect of hot air, called haka of Tane-rore, and in some versions, earthquakes.

In some traditions, Rūaumoko creates the Auckland volcanic field alongside his brother Mataaho, in retribution for a war between two rival tribes of patupaiarehe.

== Namesakes ==
Ruaumoko Patera, named after this god, is one of many paterae (shallow craters) on Io, one of Jupiter's moons.

== See also ==
- Mahuika, Māori fire goddess
