= Rangi and Papa =

World parents of Māori creation story

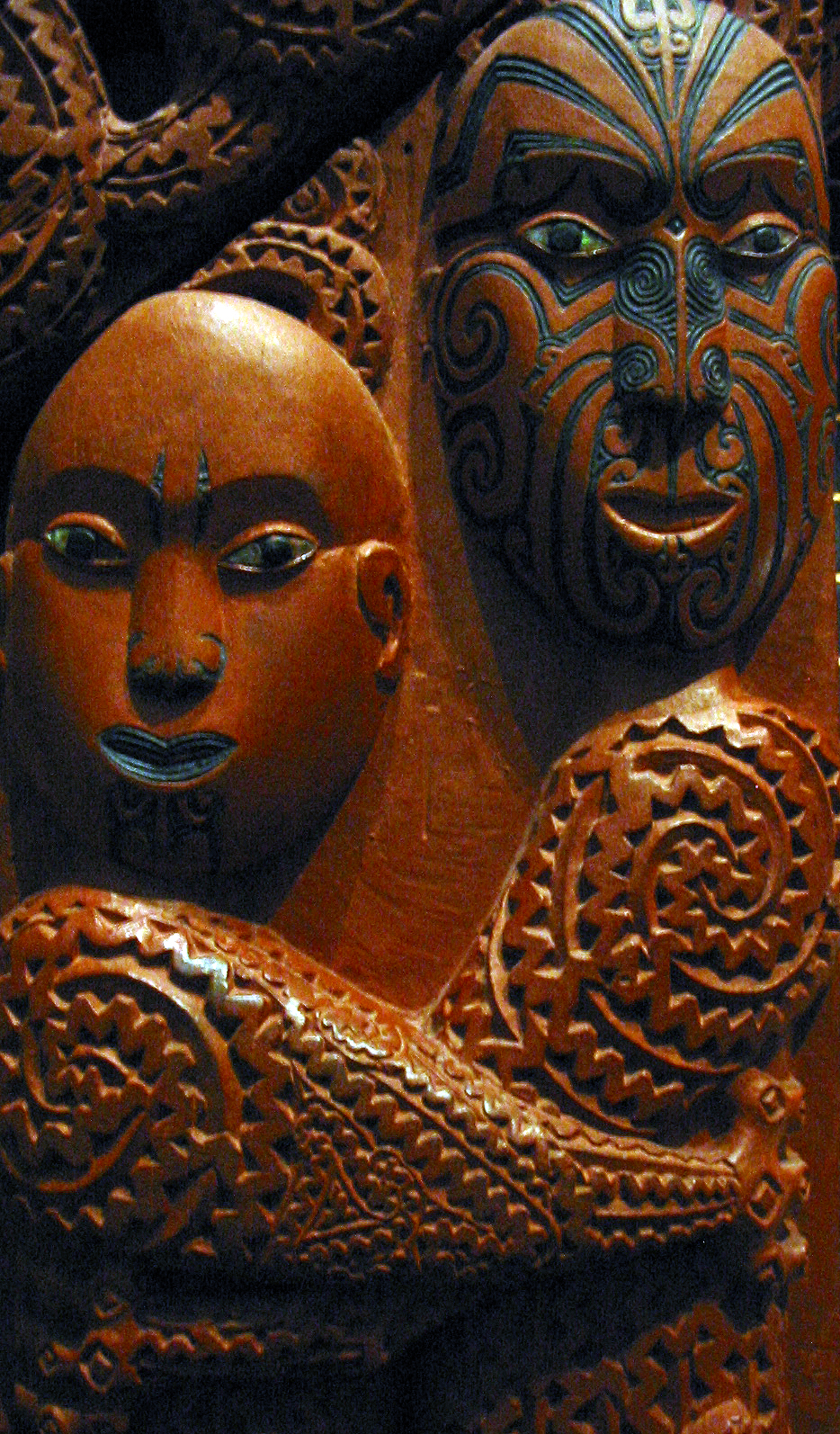
Papa and Rangi held each other in a tight embrace

In Māori mythology the primal couple Rangi and Papa (or Ranginui and Papatūānuku) appear in a creation myth explaining the origin of the world and the Māori people (though there are many different versions). In some South Island dialects, Rangi is called Raki or Rakinui.

== Union and separation ==
Ranginui first married Poharua Te Pō where they bore 3 offspring including Aorangi (or Aoraki as given in South Island). He later married Papatūānuku together becoming the primordial sky father and earth mother bearing over 500 children of male and female including Tāwhirimātea, Tāne and Tangaroa. Both Ranginui and Papatūānuku lie locked together in a tight embrace, and their sons forced to live in the cramped darkness between them.

These children grow and discuss among themselves what it would be like to live in the light. Tūmatauenga, the fiercest of the children, proposes that the best solution to their predicament is to kill their parents. But his brother Tāne disagrees, suggesting that it is better to push them apart, to let Ranginui be as a stranger to them in the sky above while Papatūānuku will remain below to nurture them. The others put their plans into action—Rongo, the god of cultivated food, tries to push his parents apart, then Tangaroa, the god of the sea, and his sibling Haumia-tiketike, the god of wild food, join him. In spite of their joint efforts Rangi and Papa remain close together in their loving embrace.

After many attempts Tāne, god of forests and birds, forces his parents apart. Instead of standing upright and pushing with his hands as his brothers have done, he lies on his back and pushes with his strong legs. Stretching every sinew Tāne pushes and pushes until, with cries of grief and surprise, Ranginui and Papatūānuku were pried apart. Traditions of the Taranaki region, however, assign this separating role to Tangaroa, god of the sea.

== War in heaven and earth ==
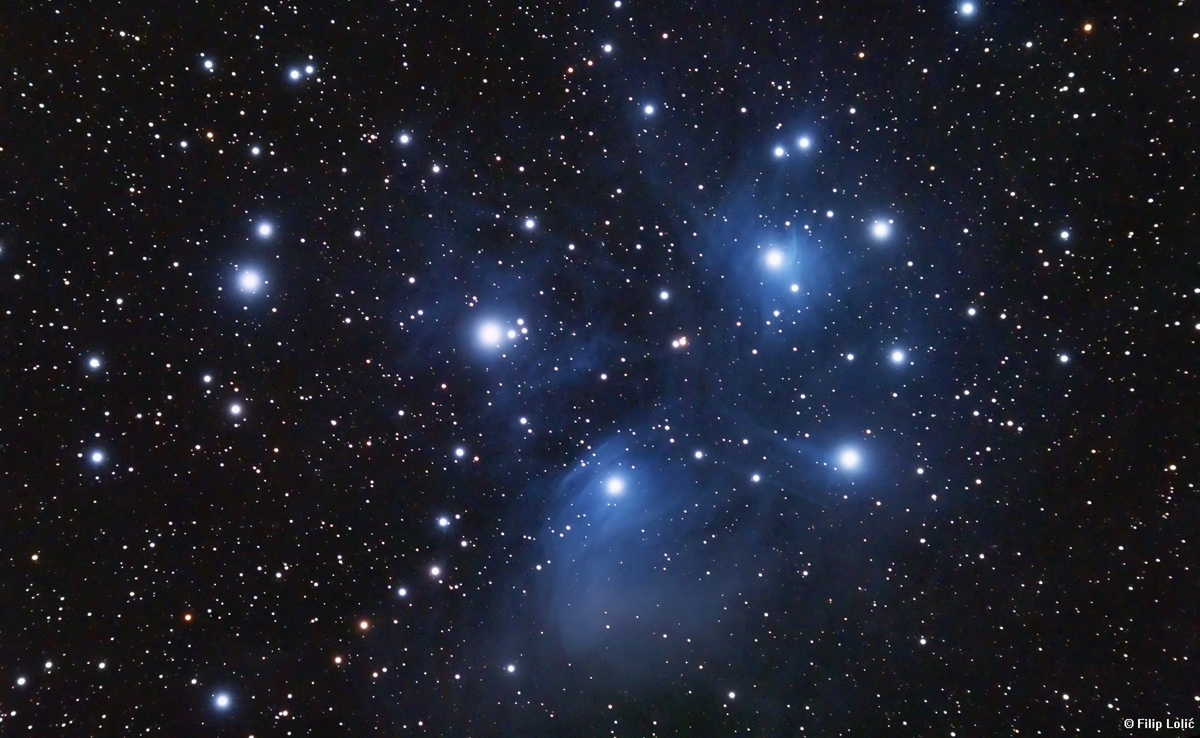
Tāne adorned Ranginui with stars

And so the children of Ranginui and Papatūanuku see light and have space to move for the first time. While the other children have agreed to the separation, Tāwhirimātea, the god of storms and winds, is angered that the parents have been torn apart. He cannot bear to hear the cries of his parents nor see the tears of Ranginui as they are parted, he promises his siblings that from henceforth they will have to deal with his anger. He flies off to join Rangi and there carefully fosters his own many offspring who include the winds, one of whom is sent to each quarter of the compass. To fight his brothers, Tāwhirimātea gathers an army of his children —winds and clouds of different kinds, including fierce squalls, whirlwinds, gloomy thick clouds, fiery clouds, hurricane clouds and thunderstorm clouds, and rain, mists and fog. As these winds show their might the dust flies and the great forest trees of Tāne are smashed under the attack and fall to the ground, food for decay and for insects.

Then Tāwhirimātea attacks the oceans and huge waves rise, whirlpools form, and Tangaroa, the god of the sea, flees in panic. Punga, a son of Tangaroa, has two children, Ikatere father of fish, and Tū-te-wehiwehi (or Tū-te-wanawana) the ancestor of reptiles. Terrified by Tāwhirimātea's onslaught the fish seek shelter in the sea and the reptiles in the forests. Ever since Tangaroa has been angry with Tāne for giving refuge to his runaway children. So it is that Tāne supplies the descendants of Tūmatauenga with canoes, fishhooks and nets to catch the descendants of Tangaroa. Tangaroa retaliates by swamping canoes and sweeping away houses, land and trees that are washed out to sea in floods.

Tāwhirimātea next attacks his brothers Rongo and Haumia-tiketike, the gods of cultivated and uncultivated foods. Rongo and Haumia are in great fear of Tāwhirimātea but, as he attacks them, Papatūānuku determines to keep these for her other children and hides them so well that Tāwhirimātea cannot find them. So Tāwhirimātea turns on his brother Tūmatauenga. He uses all his strength but Tūmatauenga stands fast and Tāwhirimatea cannot prevail against him. Tū (or human kind) stands fast and, at last, the anger of the gods subsided and peace prevailed.

Tū thought about the actions of Tāne in separating their parents and made snares to catch the birds, the children of Tāne who could no longer fly free. He then made nets from forest plants and casts them in the sea so that the children of Tangaroa soon lie in heaps on the shore. He made hoes to dig the ground, capturing his brothers Rongo and Haumia-tiketike where they have hidden from Tāwhirimātea in the bosom of the earth mother and, recognising them by their long hair that remains above the surface of the earth, he drags them forth and heaps them into baskets to be eaten. So Tūmatauenga eats all of his brothers to repay them for their cowardice; the only brother that Tūmatauenga does not subdue is Tāwhirimātea, whose storms and hurricanes attack humankind to this day.

There was one more child of Ranginui and Papatūānuku who was never born and still lives inside Papatūanuku. Whenever this child is kicking the earth shakes and it causes an earthquake. Rūaumoko is his name and he is the god of earthquakes and volcanoes.

== Yearning ==
Tāne searched for heavenly bodies as lights so that his father would be appropriately dressed. He obtained the stars and threw them up, along with the moon and the sun. At last Ranginui looked handsome. Ranginui and Papatūānuku continue to grieve for each other to this day. Ranginui's tears fall towards Papatūanuku to show how much he loves her. Sometimes Papatūānuku heaves and strains and almost breaks herself apart to reach her beloved partner again but it is to no avail. When mist rises from the forests, these are Papatūānuku's sighs as the warmth of her body yearns for Ranginui and continues to nurture mankind.

== In the world today ==
Rangi and Papa are shown as the sky father and mother earth. Before they were torn apart they held each other very tightly. And their children lived in the dark space between them. After Tane pushed them apart Rangi stayed in the sky and Papa became the earth. The myth goes every time there is rain its Rangi is crying to be with Papa.

== Names and epithets ==
Ranginui

- Rangi ("Sky")
- Raki ("Sky") in the South Island (see Māori language#South Island dialects)
- Ranginui ("Great Sky")
- Rangi-pōtiki ("Rangi the Lastborn"): possibly another name of Rangi, or a closely allied deity

Papatuanuku

- Papa ("world")
- Papatūānuku ("world separated"), (Earth), (Mother Earth)

== See also ==
- Anu and Ki, Sumerian deities similar to Rangi and Papa
- Atea, husband of Papa (primordial parents) in Tuamotuan, Rarotongan and Marquesas genealogies
- Dyaúṣ-pitṛ and Pṛthvī-mātṛ, Vedic deities similar to Rangi and Papa
- Nut and Geb, Egyptian deities similar to Rangi and Papa
- Uranus and Gæa, Greek deities similar to Rangi and Papa
- Vatea, husband of Papa, father of gods and men in Mangaia, Cook Islands
- Wākea, husband of Papa, from Hawaii
