= Urutonga =

In the mythology of some Māori tribal groups, Urutonga is the wife of Hemā, and the mother of Tāwhaki and Kahiri.

Hema was killed by the Ponaturi, and Urutonga and her sons, Tāwhaki and Karihi, killed them all but two in revenge. They tricked the Ponaturi into entering a house, and then locked them in, claiming there was still time before the dawn. They then opened the door after the sun was up, the Ponaturi died at the exposure to sunlight.
