= Kaitangata =

Kaitangata can mean the following:

- Kaitangata, New Zealand, a small town near the coast of South Otago in New Zealand
  - Kaitangata Mine disaster, a coal mining disaster at Kaitangata in 1879
  - Kaitangata Line, a branch line from Stirling on the Main South Line to Kaitangata
- Kaitangata (mythology), a character in Māori mythology
- "Kai Tangata", a song by Alien Weaponry
