= Hemā =

Hemā is a figure in both Hawaiian and Māori mythology, as well as an epithet of the goddess Lakshmi in Hinduism.

== Māori ==
In Māori mythology, Hema is a son of Whaitiri and Kaitangata and the father of Tāwhaki and Karihi. In North Island stories, he was killed by the Ponaturi, evil creatures who live by day in the water. Tāwhaki, Karihi and their mother trick the Ponaturi into entering a house, and then locked them in, claiming there was still time before the dawn. They then opened the door after sunrise, and the Ponaturi were killed by the exposure to sunlight (Tregear 1891:61, 496). The only survivor (in one account) was Tonga-Hiti and in another account kanae, the grey mullet.

== Hawaii ==
In Hawaiian mythology, Hemā and his brother Puna are sons of the man named Aikanaka by his consort, Hinahanaiakamalama—often simply called Hina. His son was Kaha'i. Hina is disgusted by her children's dirtiness, and she goes to the moon. In some accounts, Hemā sails to a far-off country, where he is killed by the people which habitually kill all strangers. Kaha'i goes on a journey to find him. Other accounts have Hemā as a son of Mahina.
