= Tuna (Polynesian mythology) =

Polynesian god of eels

- God of eels
- Animals: Eel
- Enemy: Māui
- Gender: Male
- Consort: Hina

In Polynesian mythology, Tuna is a god of eels. In Hawaiian mythology he fights with Māui, who is having an affair with his wife Sina. Māui kills him, cuts off his head, and plants it near his home. A green shoot emerges from the spot where the head was buried, and grows into the first coconut palm. In the mythology of Mangaia Tuna is the lover of Hine, and asks that his head be cut off and planted in order to stop a flood. A coconut shoot grows from the head. A variant of the story is told in the Samoan myth of Sina and the Eel.

== See also ==
- Māui (Hawaiian mythology)
