= Uira (disambiguation) =

Uira can refer to

- UIRA, a project to create an open-source animation software
- Te Uira, a personification of lightning in Māori mythology.
