= Mahina (mythology) =

Deity in Hawaiian mythology

- Lunar deity
- Venerated in: Hawaiian religion
- Gender: Female
- Consort: Aikanaka
- Offspring: Hemā

In Hawaiian mythology, Mahina is a lunar deity, mother of Hemā. Mahina is also the word for the "Moon" in Hawaiian language.

It is likely that she is the same as the goddess Hina or Lona.

== See also ==
- Mahina, French Polynesia
- Hina
- Aikanaka, possibly Mahina's husband
- List of lunar deities
