= Matakerepō =

Matakerepō, in a Māori story of the Arawa tribe of Rotorua, is a female ancestor of the hero Tāwhaki. She is an example of the 'female helper', a recurrent element in Polynesian myth and legend, who assists Tāwhaki to attain his quest of finding his wife and daughter, from whom he is estranged. Matakerepō is a somewhat threatening figure who must be placated.

Soon after Tāwhaki and his slave set off on their journey, they come upon Matakerepō guarding the vines (or ropes) that form the pathway up into the heavens, where Tāwhaki's daughter Puanga and his wife Hāpai are living. Matakerepō is blind. As she counts out the ten taro tubers that are heaped in front of her, Tāwhaki removes the tenth taro when Matakerepō has reached nine. She counts again, and this time Tāwhaki removes the ninth tuber. This continues until the old woman realises that someone is deceiving her.

She begins to sniff the air, and her stomach distends, ready to swallow the stranger. She sniffs towards the south, then towards the east, and towards all the winds. When she sniffs towards the west she catches Tāwhaki's scent. She calls out 'Are you come with the wind that blows on my skin?' Tāwhaki grunts, and Matakerepō says, 'Oh, it is my grandson Tāwhaki.' As she says this, her stomach begins to shrink again. If he had not been from the west wind, she would have swallowed him whole.

Matakerepō then asks Tāwhaki where he is going. He tells her that he is searching for his daughter, who is with his wife; for his wife is a daughter of Whatitiri-matakamataka (or Whaitiri, goddess of thunder) and has returned to her home in the heavens. Matakerepō then shows him the pathway to the heavens, and advises him to wait until morning before he sets off. Tāwhaki's slave prepares a meal. Tāwhaki takes some of the cooked food, mixes it with his saliva, and rubs it on the eyes of the old blind woman. This cures Matakerepō of her blindness. In the morning, the slave prepares a meal to make Tāwhaki strong for his journey. Tāwhaki presents his slave to Matakerepō, who gives him further advice on how to climb the vines, and makes an incantation to help him as climbs off into the sky. When he reaches the heavens, Tāwhaki disguises himself as an old slave and assists his brothers-in-law to build a canoe. Each night, the brothers-in-law return to their village, where Tāwhaki's wife and daughter are living. Tāwhaki pretends to be old and slow, and returns to finish the canoe, before going on to the village. This behaviour brings Tāwhaki to the attention of his wife, and before long, they are reconciled.

Women similar to Matakerepō appear in many Māori stories. For instance, in a Ngāti Porou legend of Tāwhaki, the guardian of Whaitiri's house is Te Ruahine-mata-morari, whose name means 'The old blind woman'.

(Matakerepō has also been equated with Whaitiri by Tregear and others; however in some stories they are definitely separate entities. Despite the fact that the source is plainly identified in the original manuscript as 'Hohepa Paraone, Te Ngae, Rotorua, March 7, 1850', White unaccountably attributes the story to the Ngāi Tahu tribe of the South Island; he also has 'Pihanga' instead of 'Puanga' for the name of Tāwhaki's daughter).

== See also ==
- Whaitiri
