= Mahina =

Mahina may refer to:

- Mahina (mythology), a lunar deity, mother of Hema
- Mahina, French Polynesia
  - A.S. Olympique de Mahina, an association football club
- Mahina, Mali
- Cyclone Mahina of 1899
- Mahina, a Hindi word for month, see Hindu calendar
