= Ngā Atua =

In some versions of the Māori legend of Tāwhaki, Ngā Atua is the sixth of the twelve layers of the heavens (Craig 1989:183, White 1887–1891, I:App).
