= Tokyo Dental College Junior College =

Coordinates: 35°42′05″N 139°45′18″E

Tokyo Dental College Junior College (東京歯科大学短期大学, Tokyo Shika Daigaku Tanki Daigaku) is a private junior college in Chiyoda, Tokyo, Japan. It was founded in 1949 as a vocational school under the management of Tokyo Dental College. It was re-established as a junior college on August 31, 2016.
