= Karihi-Nui =

Karihi-nui (Karihi amongst the Māori) (also Alihi, Arii, Karihi Alise) was the brother of Tahaki in Tuamotuan legend. In Samoa, Karihi Alise accompanied his brother Tafa'i to heaven to woo the goddess Sina.
