= Hina-Oio =

Hina-Oio is a goddess of the sea animals in the mythology of Easter Island. She was married to Atua-Metua and represented the mother of all animals of the sea.

Hina is a divine figure common throughout the Polynesian narrative, with prominent variants also found in Māori mythology, Samoan mythology, and Hawaiian religion. The creation chant of the Rapa Nui people of Easter Island refers to Hina-Oio twice in the following passage:

Huru-au ki ai ki roto Hina-oio,
ka pu te moa.
A Hikua ki ai ki roto Hina-oio,
ka pu te uraura.

Feather by mating with Hina-oio
produced the fowl
Tail by mating with Hina-oio
produced the crayfish

— Sung by Ure-vai-ko, in Thomson 1886

This passage was sung from memory by an old man named Ure-vai-ko to William Thomson, an American on an 1886 Smithsonian expedition to Easter Island. The chant was written in Rongorongo on tablets, which Ure-vai-ko refused to read for religious reasons. However, under the influence of alcohol, he agreed to recite the stories and chants on the tablets from photographs of them which had been made by Thomson's expedition.
