= Tongahiti =

Tongahiti is one of Tāwhaki's enemies in a Māori tradition which White (1887–1891) attributes to the Ngāti Hau iwi. In this tale, Tāwhaki blocks up all the chinks in the house of his enemies, a house of which his grandmother Whaitiri is the doorkeeper. Before sunset, the enemies – who are like small birds – flock into the house in great numbers. Tongahiti is among them. When morning comes, the enemies sleep on, because no light can enter the house. Tongahiti makes a remark about the length of the night, and suggests that Whaitiri may be deceiving them. Tāwhaki now lets the light in, and then kills all the creatures except Tongahiti, who manages to escape through a small hole he pierces through the base of one of the posts at the back of the house.

Tongahiti is called 'god of headaches' by White (1887–1891) in his English translation of the story. The reference to headaches does not appear in the Māori text. (Tongahiti is also mentioned by Tregear as 'the god of Headache', giving White I:101 as his source).
