= Kanae =

- Gender: Unisex

Origin
- Origin: Japanese
- Meaning: Different meanings depending on the kanji or Kana used

Kanae (written:かなえ,カナエ, 佳苗, 香苗, 香奈恵, 香奈枝, 鼎, etc.) is a common name given to girls in contemporary Japan. However, traditionally it is a unisex name. Notable people with the name include:

- Kanae Aoki (青木 香奈枝; born 1985), Japanese ice hockey player
- Kanae Hanazawa (花澤 鼎; born 1882 died 1950), Japanese dentist, dental scientist
- Kanae Hisami (久見 香奈恵; born 1987), Japanese tennis player
- Kanae Ikehata (池端 花奈恵; born 1982), Japanese fencer
- Kanae Itō (伊藤 かな恵; born 1986), Japanese voice actress and singer
- Kanae Kijima (木嶋 佳苗; born 1974), Japanese serial killer
- Kanae Minato (湊 かなえ; born 1973), Japanese writer of crime fiction and thrillers
- Kanaye Nagasawa (長澤 鼎; born 1852 died 1934), Winemaker
- Kanae Oki (沖 佳苗; born 1984), Japanese voice actress
- Kanae Shirosawa (白沢 かなえ), Japanese singer and voice actress
- Kanae Yagi (八木 かなえ; born 1992), Japanese weightlifter
- Kanae Yamamoto (artist) (山本 鼎; born 1882 died 1946), Japanese artist
- Kanae Yamamoto (politician) (山本 香苗; born 1971), Japanese politician
- Kanae Yoshii (吉井 香奈恵; born 1993), Japanese idol, singer and actress
- Kanae (叶), Japanese VTuber affiliated with Nijisanji

== Fictional characters ==
- Kanae (カナエ), character in the manga series Elfen Lied
- Kanae Kotonami (琴南 奏江), character in the manga series Skip Beat!
- Kanae Sumida (澄田 花苗), character in the animated film 5 Centimeters per Second
- Kanae (鼎), character in the game Akatsuki Blitzkampf
- Kanae Aira (姶良 香奈江), character in the book and anime Juni Taisen: Zodiac War
- Kanae, a character from the PlayStation 2 horror video game Forbidden Siren 2
- Kanae Kocho (胡蝶 カナエ), character in the manga and anime Demon Slayer: Kimetsu no Yaiba
- Kanae Ohtori (鳳 香苗), a character in the anime Revolutionary Girl Utena
