= Kanae Hanazawa =

- 花澤 鼎
- Kanae Hanazawa
- Born: May 25, 1882; Kozai, Katori District, Chiba Prefecture, Japan
- Died: February 22, 1950 (aged 67)
- Education: Tokyo Dental College
- Scientific career
- Fields: Oral pathology, Oral histology
- Workplaces: Tokyo Dental College
- Notable students: Seiichi Matsumiya, Shosaburo Takuma

Kanae Hanazawa (Japanese: 花澤 鼎; May 25, 1882 – February 22, 1950) was a Japanese dentist, dental scientist, and oral pathologist. He served as professor at Tokyo Dental Medical College, director of its affiliated hospital, and later as the first head of the preparatory division of Tokyo Dental College. In 1923, he received a Doctor of Medicine degree from Keio University, becoming the first dentist in Japan to earn a medical doctorate. His work in oral pathology was later continued at Tokyo Dental College by researchers including Seiichi Matsumiya.

== Early life and education ==
Hanazawa was born on May 25, 1882, in Kozai Village, Katori District, Chiba Prefecture, as the second son of the Nemoto family. In 1896 he was adopted into the Hanazawa family and thereafter used the surname Hanazawa.

He entered Tokyo Dental College in 1900 and graduated in 1902. After graduation, he studied pathology at the research institute of the Osaka Medical School. He joined Tokyo Dental College in 1905 and became a professor at Tokyo Dental Medical College in 1907.

In 1913, Hanazawa traveled to Germany and conducted research at the University of Strasbourg. He returned to Japan in 1914 following the outbreak of World War I.

== Academic career ==
After returning to Japan, Hanazawa taught and conducted research mainly in histopathology at Tokyo Dental Medical College. From 1920 he served as director of the school's affiliated hospital.

In 1923, Keio University awarded him the degree of Doctor of Medicine. Contemporary and later historical studies of Japanese dental education identify Hanazawa as the first dentist in Japan to obtain a medical doctorate.

When the former-system Tokyo Dental College was authorized in 1946, Hanazawa became the first head of its preparatory division.

Hanazawa died on February 22, 1950, at the age of 67. Following his death, Seiichi Matsumiya succeeded him in leading pathological research at Tokyo Dental College and continued several of the experimental research themes developed under Hanazawa.

== Research ==
Hanazawa's research focused on oral histology and oral pathology, including histopathological studies of dental hard tissues and the dental pulp. He also studied dental caries, infected root canals, and periapical lesions.

He helped establish a foundation for histopathological research at Tokyo Dental College and promoted the use of microscopy in oral histology and oral pathology.

Hanazawa's experimental studies of the dental pulp, infected root canals, and periapical lesions subsequently formed part of the research tradition inherited by Seiichi Matsumiya. Matsumiya later expanded this work toward clinical oral pathology and research on dental hard tissues.

In 1915 Hanazawa published Shika soshiki oyobi byōri kenkyūhō (歯科組織及病理研究法, "Methods for the Study of Oral Histology and Pathology"). He later authored works on dental embryology, oral histology, dental pathology, and illustrated dental histology.

Hanazawa also adapted the work of American dental researcher Willoughby D. Miller for Japanese readers. His 1916 volume Hozon shikagaku (保存齒科學), based on Miller's work, has been discussed in later dental-historical scholarship as an early attempt to introduce European conservative dentistry into Japan.

Hanazawa contributed microphotographs to the pathological atlas Byōri soshiki shashin zufu by Hiroshi Kon. A later bibliographical study described the work as Japan's first pathological atlas based on original microphotographs and noted that Hanazawa had been responsible for the microscopy.

== Influence and legacy ==
Hanazawa's work helped establish a research tradition in oral histology and oral pathology at Tokyo Dental Medical College. After his death in 1950, Seiichi Matsumiya succeeded him in the department and continued and expanded Hanazawa's experimental studies, particularly research concerning the dental pulp, root canal treatment, and oral pathology.

This line of research was subsequently developed by Matsumiya and researchers trained in the department, including Shosaburo Takuma. Matsumiya later became professor of oral pathology and president of Tokyo Dental College.

After Hanazawa's death, his textbook Shiga soshiki zusetsu (歯牙組織図説, "Illustrated Dental Histology") continued to be used and revised. A third edition was prepared by Seiichi Matsumiya, Takahiro Matsui, and Shosaburo Takuma and published by Tokyo Dental College Press in 1957.

In 1950, following a donation from Hanazawa's wife Tsuneko, the Tokyo Dental College Library established the "Hanazawa Collection" from his personal library. According to the library, the collection contains 424 items.

== Selected works ==
- 齒科組織及病理學實習法 (Methods of Practical Dental Histology and Pathology), Shikagakuhosha, 1910.
- 歯科組織及病理研究法 (Methods for the Study of Oral Histology and Pathology), Shikagakuhosha, 1915.
- 保存齒科學 (Conservative Dentistry), based on W. D. Miller, Tokyo Dental Medical College Press, 1916.
- 齒科胎生學 (Dental Embryology), Shikagakuhosha, 1924.
- 齒科組織學 (Dental Histology), Shikagakuhosha, 1924.
- 齒科病理學 (Dental Pathology), Shikagakuhosha, 1924.
- 歯牙再植術 (Tooth Replantation), with Fuji Sugiyama, Shikagakuhosha, 1925.
- 根管の處置 (Root Canal Treatment), Shikagakuhosha, 1927.
- 齒牙組織圖説 (Illustrated Dental Histology), Shikagakuhosha, 1935.
