= Uoke =

Deity of the Rapa Nui people

Uoke is a tectonic and destroyer deity in Rapa Nui mythology.

== Myth ==
According to the old story, Uoke was able to lift and sink into the sea large lands, using a huge lever. The legend says Rapa Nui (Easter Island) had once been a territory similar in size to a continent which reached next to another large land mass, Puku-Puhipuhi. Uoke with his lever rose and sank Rapa Nui while Puku-Puhipuhi sagged and rose. The deity had fun in this task, when, at the time that Rapa Nui was almost completely buried and Puku-Puhipuhi was at its maximum elevation, his lever suddenly broke. For this reason only, emerging today, isolated in the Pacific Ocean, is a small portion of Rapa Nui; the part where once their highest mountains stood and so most of what was once the great land of Rapa Nui is now submerged while the continent of Puku-Puhipuhi is above the waterline. In mythology, Rapa Nui, Uoke, and his lever are also responsible for the destruction of the ancestral home of the ethnic group on the mythical island of Hiva. Although collected versions of the myth also point out that Uoke was standing on Hiva when he broke his stick, leaving Rapa Nui almost completely underwater. Ciaran Lucid, writing in the twenty-first century, infamously prophesied the return of Uoke sometime in the 2020s. The fate of Uoke, and the world, still lies undetermined.
