= Seiichi Matsumiya =

Japanese dentist and oral pathologist (1909–1987)

- 松宮 誠一
- Seiichi Matsumiya
- Born: 5 February 1909; Shiga Prefecture, Japan
- Died: 25 September 1987 (aged 78)
- Education: Tokyo Dental Medical College; Nagoya Imperial University
- Known for: Experimental studies of dental pulp and root canal treatment; Electron microscopy of dental hard tissues
- Scientific career
- Fields: Oral pathology
- Workplaces: Tokyo Dental College
- Academic advisors: Kanae Hanazawa

Seiichi Matsumiya (松宮 誠一, Matsumiya Seiichi; 5 February 1909 – 25 September 1987) was a Japanese dentist, dental researcher, and oral pathologist. He served as president of Tokyo Dental College from 1976 to 1983 and was subsequently appointed honorary president and professor emeritus of the college.

His research included experimental pathological studies of the dental pulp and root canal treatment, as well as early applications of electron microscopy to the study of dental hard tissues. He also played roles in dental education and international academic exchange.

== Early life and career ==
Matsumiya was born in Shiga Prefecture on 5 February 1909. He graduated from Tokyo Dental Medical College in 1930. In 1940, he completed an advanced course at the Faculty of Medicine of Nagoya Imperial University and received a doctorate in medicine.

In 1945, under a special measure introduced by Imperial Ordinance No. 216, Matsumiya passed an examination that enabled qualified dentists to obtain a physician's license. He was entered on the Japanese medical register in 1947.

He served successively as lecturer, associate professor, and professor at his alma mater. At Tokyo Dental College, he was vice president from 1971 to 1976 and president from July 1976 until March 1983. In April 1983, he was named honorary president and professor emeritus. He also served as a member of the Science Council of Japan and of Japan's Medical Ethics Council.

In 1981, Matsumiya was awarded the Order of the Sacred Treasure, Second Class. He died on 25 September 1987 and was posthumously awarded the court rank of Senior Fourth Rank (従四位).

== Research and education ==
=== Research inherited from Kanae Hanazawa ===
Matsumiya studied under oral pathologist Kanae Hanazawa. He continued and expanded Hanazawa's experimental studies of dental pulp and root canal treatment.

Following Hanazawa's death in 1950, Matsumiya succeeded him as head of the pathology department at Tokyo Dental College. He developed the experimental pathological studies inherited from Hanazawa into clinical pathological research aimed at establishing more rational treatment methods for infected teeth.

Matsumiya also participated in revising Hanazawa's publications. In 1957, together with Takahiro Matsui and Shosaburo Takuma, he revised the third edition of Hanazawa's book Shiga soshiki zusetsu (歯牙組織図説; an illustrated work on dental histology).

=== Electron microscopy of dental hard tissues ===
In 1949, Matsumiya and colleagues, including Shosaburo Takuma, began using electron microscopy for dental research at the Hitachi Central Research Laboratory. In 1951, Tokyo Dental College installed its first electron microscope.

Matsumiya, Takuma, and their colleagues used electron microscopy to investigate the fine structure of dental hard tissues, including tooth surfaces, enamel, changes associated with dental caries, and the effects of naturally occurring and applied fluorides.

In 1954, Matsumiya and Takuma published Shiga denshi kenbikyō zusetsu (歯牙電子顕微鏡図説), an illustrated work on the electron microscopy of teeth, through the Tokyo Dental College Press.

=== Dental education and mentorship ===
Matsumiya promoted the use of diagrams and micrographs in the teaching of oral pathology. According to American dental researcher David B. Scott, Matsumiya considered the limited availability of effective visual teaching materials to be one reason why students and clinicians found oral pathology difficult to approach, and he sought to make tissue structures and pathological changes easier to understand through illustrated atlases.

In 1965, Matsumiya became chair of a committee established by a conference of Japanese dental university presidents to revise teaching guidelines for dental education. The project involved approximately 130 professors recommended by dental schools throughout Japan and continued for about five years, producing teaching guidelines for 15 subject areas, including oral anatomy.

The Japanese foreword to the 1983 bibliography of the Department of Oral Pathology at Tokyo Dental College listed 66 papers and books by Matsumiya and 257 papers produced under his supervision, including 121 degree theses.

Among researchers trained under Matsumiya were Shosaburo Takuma, Atsumi Suzuki, Shusaku Yoshiki, Shigeo Eda, Noriyuki Nagai, and Takaaki Yanagisawa, who later held professorships in oral pathology at Japanese universities.

== International activities and recognition ==
=== International organizations and research exchange ===
Matsumiya served as president of the Japan Division of the International Association for Dental Research (IADR) from 1959 to 1960 and again from 1968 to 1970. From 1969 to 1974, he served on an IADR awards selection committee and chaired the committee from 1973 to 1974.

He also served on scientific committees of the FDI World Dental Federation and as a dental expert for the World Health Organization from 1968 to 1975.

In 1954, Matsumiya was made an honorary member of national dental associations in Thailand and India. In 1964, he was made an honorary citizen of Little Rock, Arkansas. The 1983 account of his career described the distinction as recognition of his contributions to dental academic exchange between Japan and the United States.

Matsumiya maintained a long academic relationship with David B. Scott, a former director of the U.S. National Institute of Dental Research. Their association began in the late 1940s through a shared interest in electron microscopy. The development of research by Matsumiya and Takuma contributed to Takuma spending two years conducting research in Scott's laboratory in Bethesda, Maryland. Matsumiya also served as editor-in-chief of the English-language Bulletin of Tokyo Dental College.

=== Assessment by David B. Scott ===
In a 1983 essay contributed to the volume commemorating Matsumiya's work, Scott wrote that Matsumiya's influence had been felt around the world and that his reputation had long been international. Scott also described Matsumiya's early adoption of electron microscopy and his decision to conduct research personally in the new field as being "years ahead of his time".

Scott also noted the continuing value of the illustrated atlases produced by Matsumiya and his collaborators, Matsumiya's efforts to provide faculty members with opportunities for research and training outside the college, and the role of the Bulletin of Tokyo Dental College in disseminating the college's research internationally.

== Selected works ==
- Matsumiya, Seiichi; Takuma, Shosaburo (1954). 歯牙電子顕微鏡図説 [Shiga denshi kenbikyō zusetsu; illustrated atlas of electron microscopy of teeth]. Tokyo Dental College Press.
- Hanazawa, Kanae; revised by Seiichi Matsumiya, Takahiro Matsui and Shosaburo Takuma (1957). 歯牙組織図説 [Shiga soshiki zusetsu; illustrated dental histology], 3rd ed. Tokyo Dental College Press.
- Matsumiya, Seiichi (supervising editor); Takuma, Shosaburo (editor); Suga, Shoichi et al. (1978). 図説口腔病理学 [Zusetsu kōkū byōrigaku; illustrated oral pathology], 3rd ed. Ishiyaku Publishers.
- Matsumiya, Seiichi (1979). "発刊の辞" [Preface]. In 血脇守之助伝編集委員会 (ed.), 血脇守之助伝. Tokyo Dental College.
- Matsumiya, Seiichi; Takuma, Shosaburo; Yanagisawa, Takaaki, eds. (1986). Formation, Structure, and Diseases of Teeth: In Commemoration of the Eightieth Anniversary of the Department of Oral Pathology, Tokyo Dental College. Academy H-E.
