= Motoro =

God in Polynesian mythology

Motoro is a god in Polynesian mythology, the tribal god of the Ngariki of Mangaia. He is the son of Tangiia and the brother of Ruanuku, Kereteki and Utakea. While travelling to Mangaia he argued with his two eldest brothers, was thrown into the sea, and devoured by sharks. His spirit then floated to Mangaia on a piece of hibiscus. He was known as i'o ora ("god of the living") because his followers could not be used as human sacrifices.
