= Kahaʻi =

Demigod in Polynesian mythologies

Kahaʻi (specifically: Hawaii; elsewhere Tafaki, Tafaʼi, Tahaki, Tavaʼi, Tāwhaki) is a handsome Polynesian demigod whose exploits were popular in many Polynesian mythologies.

== Hawaii ==
In Hawaiian mythology, according to the Kumulipo he is known as Kahaʻinuiahema and according to Tregear, the legends about Kahaʻi are 'extremely fragmentary and vague', but they indicate that Hema traveled to 'Kahiki' (perhaps Tahiti, but more probably to kahiki 'the distance', as kahiki can be understood to include all of the islands in the Pacific Ocean) to receive a tribute called palala for the birth of his son Kahaʻi. There he was captured by the Aiaia (a bird, messenger of the god Kane), died, and was buried in Ulu-paupau. Kahaʻi decided to go and avenge his father. A rainbow was the path over which he and his brother ʻAlihi ascended into the skies, where they asked Kane and Kanaloa where Hema's remains were to be found. Kahaʻi appears in the genealogy of Hawaiian kings.

== Tuamotus ==
In the Tuamotuan version of the myth, Tahaki and Karihi are twins, but only Tahaki has magical powers. Tahaki's father, Hema, trespassed on lands belonging to the goblins of Matuauru in order to go crabbing. They captured him and took him prisoner, and Tahaki and Karihi begin a quest to rescue him. En route, Karihi accidentally gets snared on the fishing line of their blind grandmother, Kuhi. Tahaki throws coconuts at the old woman and when they hit her, her sight is miraculously restored. Tahaki again sets out to save his father, whom he finds in a pit on Matuaru and rescues. He then proceeds to Hiva-nui, the land of the goblins, with a strong net called Tukutuhuraho-nui (great spider). Ensnaring the goblins, he beats them to death. While returning home via the land of the fish, he gives his dark skin to the Hami-kere fish. After his death, Tahaki goes to the sacred sky of Kane, where it is set apart to rule over Havaiki-nui.

== Mangareva ==
In a legend from Mangareva, Tahaki is famous for his reddish skin. During a diving competition off the inner reef, his enemies make Tahaki dive last. As each person dives down, he changes temporarily into a fish and waits below. When at last Tahaki dives, all the fish swarm in, each removing a piece of his beautiful skin. When Tahaki reappears, he is naked. Luckily for him, his grandmother is nearby. No sooner does a fish bite off a piece of skin than she takes it from its mouth and puts it in her basket. She then returns to the underworld, taking all of Tahaki's skin with her. Later, the nude Tahaki and his cousin Karihi go down to the underworld, where his grandmother restores each piece of skin to its rightful place. However, some stick insects have taken pieces of the skin to adorn their armpits and refuse to give them back. The grandmother tells Tahaki not to worry, as they only have the skin from the soles of his feet, which no one will notice. This is why Mangarevan stick insects have red under their arms.

== Samoa ==
In the Samoan version of the legend, Tafaʻi, his brother ʻAlise, and his sister Ifiifi are the children of Pua and Sigano. Their servant Lauamatoto ascends to heaven in order to find a bride suitable for Tafaʻi. He convinces the goddess Sina-tae-o-i-lagi, daughter of Tagaloa-lagi, to give an audience to the Tafaʻi and his brother, who disguise themselves as ugly old men in order to reach her court safely. Because of their appearance, the goddess rejects them. The next day, as they are about to leave, she sees their true appearance, becomes distraught, and chases after them. Tafaʻi throws Sina into a pit, but she is rescued by his parents, who bring her to live with them. Eventually, Tafaʻi falls in love with her, but she escapes back to her home in heaven. Her family convinces her to return to earth and marry Tafaʻi, with whom she bears La, the sun, who later goes to live with her mother in the sky.

== See also ==
- Tāwhaki, the equivalent hero in Māori mythology.
