= Manana Take =

Goddess in Rapa Nui mythology

Manana Take was a goddess in the Rapa Nui mythology, the original religion on Easter Island. She was the consort of Era Nuku, the god of the feathers and farming.

Manana Take lived in the sky. The Manana once visited earth in the shape of a fish, which was given to the king because of its size and beauty. Recognising the divinity in the fish, all monarchs were thereafter forbidden to swim in the sea.
