= Manaiakalani =

Māui's fish hook, composed of the constellation Scorpius

Mānaiakalani is a constellation in Polynesian culture which translates to "The Chief's Fishline". It refers to the fishhook of demi-god Māui. Polynesian mythology tells of Māui pulling large fish from the ocean, representing the discovery of new islands. It is primarily made of Scorpius and the Navigator's Triangle.

== Mythology ==
=== Creation ===
In traditional Māori stories, Māui was a food server to his ailing grandmother (or grandfather), Muri-ranga-whenua. But instead of giving her the food, he hid it away. After she starved to death, Māui took her jawbone, which was infused with mana.

In some Hawaiin versions of the story, the hook was made by his grandmother, Hina. She polished it until it shined like the moon, infusing it with mana and its fishing line was securely lashed using ultra-strong olonā fibers.

In the Tongan version of the story, instead of being a bone made from his ancestors, Māui instead traveled to the underworld where he met a fisherman named Tongafusifonua, who gave Māui the hook after he either tricked him or begged him into giving it to him.

=== Pulling up the Islands ===
According to the Māori tradition, Māui wasn't that good a fisherman, and his older brothers would always leave him behind on fishing trips. So, one day he decided to stow away in their canoe and didn't reveal himself until they were far enough away from land that they couldn't just turn around. His older brothers were annoyed with this and still refused to give him bait. So, Māui punched himself in the nose until it bled, smeared his blood on Mānaiakalani, and cast it into the ocean. Soon enough, he felt his hook catch on something big, and he told his brothers to paddle the boat as hard as they could. Eventually, the massive fish had surfaced, and Māui told his brothers to leave it be while he retrieved a priest to do the proper ritual. only. But his brothers grew impatient and chopped up the fish for themselves, only for it to turn into an island. If the brothers had waited, then the island would have been a flat surface that was much easier to cross. But all of their chopping led to the creation of mountains, valleys, and rivers across New Zealand.

In the Hawaiian version of the story, when Māui's brothers returned with a massive shark, Māui mocked its size and said if they had taken him along with them, he would have caught something bigger than that. Upon finding the right fishing spot, he baited the hook the ʻalae, birds that are sacred to his mother, Hina, and he pulled up the islands Hawai’i, Maui, Kaho’olawe, Lana’i, Moloka’i, O’ahu, Kaua’i, and Ni’ihau directly from the ocean floor.

=== Lassoing the Sun ===
Depending on the version, the sun would either travel across the sky way too quickly or at just random intervals throughout the day. This made it difficult for Hina to hang and dry her laundry. So Māui gathered his brothers and little sister Hinauri and traveled east to where the sun rested before rising in the morning. Then using a net or noose they had made out of Hinauri's hair, they tied it around the sun, restraining it, and Māui beat it with Mānaiakalani until it agreed to travel across the sky slower.

In the Hawaiian version of the story, they simply convince the sun to slow down without beating it or use the lasso on the sun to slow it down as it traveled.

=== Navigation Point ===
After Māui died following his failed attempt to bring immortality to humans, the hook was cast into the sky in order to honor his great deeds, forming the constellation Scorpius.
