= Māui (Hawaiian mythology) =

Figure in Hawaiian mythology

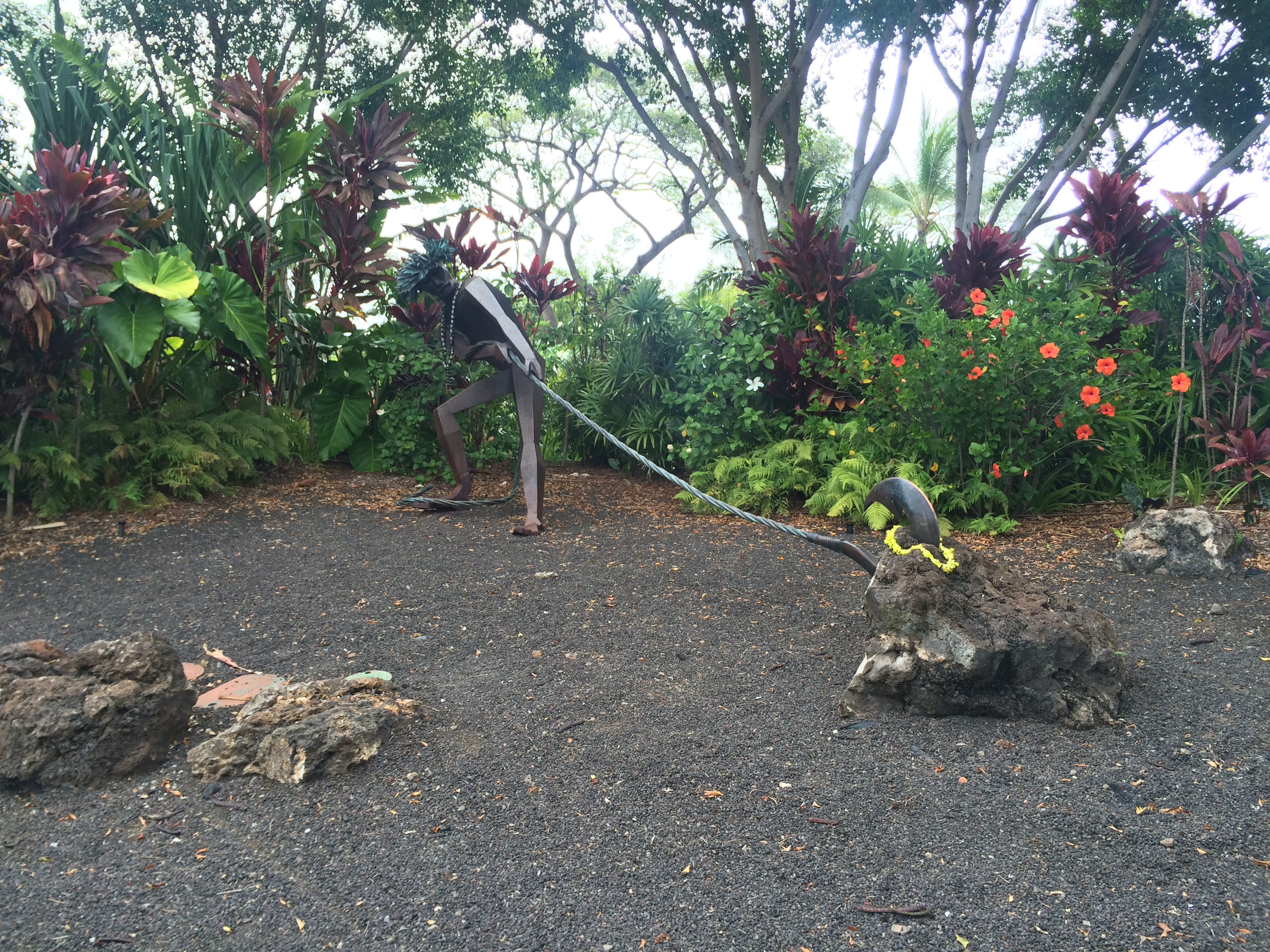
Sculpture of Maui capturing the sun

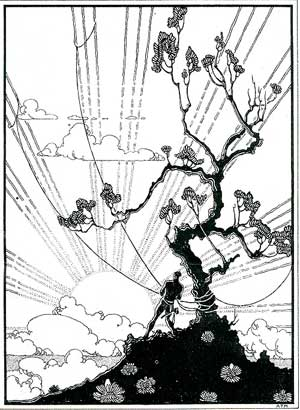
Māui Snaring the Sun, pen and ink drawing by Arman Manookian, circa 1927, Honolulu Academy of Arts

In Hawaiian religion, Māui is a culture hero and ancient chief who appears in several different genealogies. In the Kumulipo, he is the son of ʻAkalana and his wife Hina-a-ke-ahi (Hina). This couple has four sons, Māui-mua, Māui-waena, Māui-kiʻikiʻi, and Māui-a-kalana. Māui-a-kalana's wife is named Hinakealohaila, and his son is named Nanamaoa. Māui is one of the Kupua. His name is the same as that of the Hawaiian island Maui, although native tradition holds that it is not named for him directly, but instead named after the son of Hawaii's discoverer (who was named after Māui himself).

== Legendary exploits ==
=== Hauling up the islands of Hawaii ===
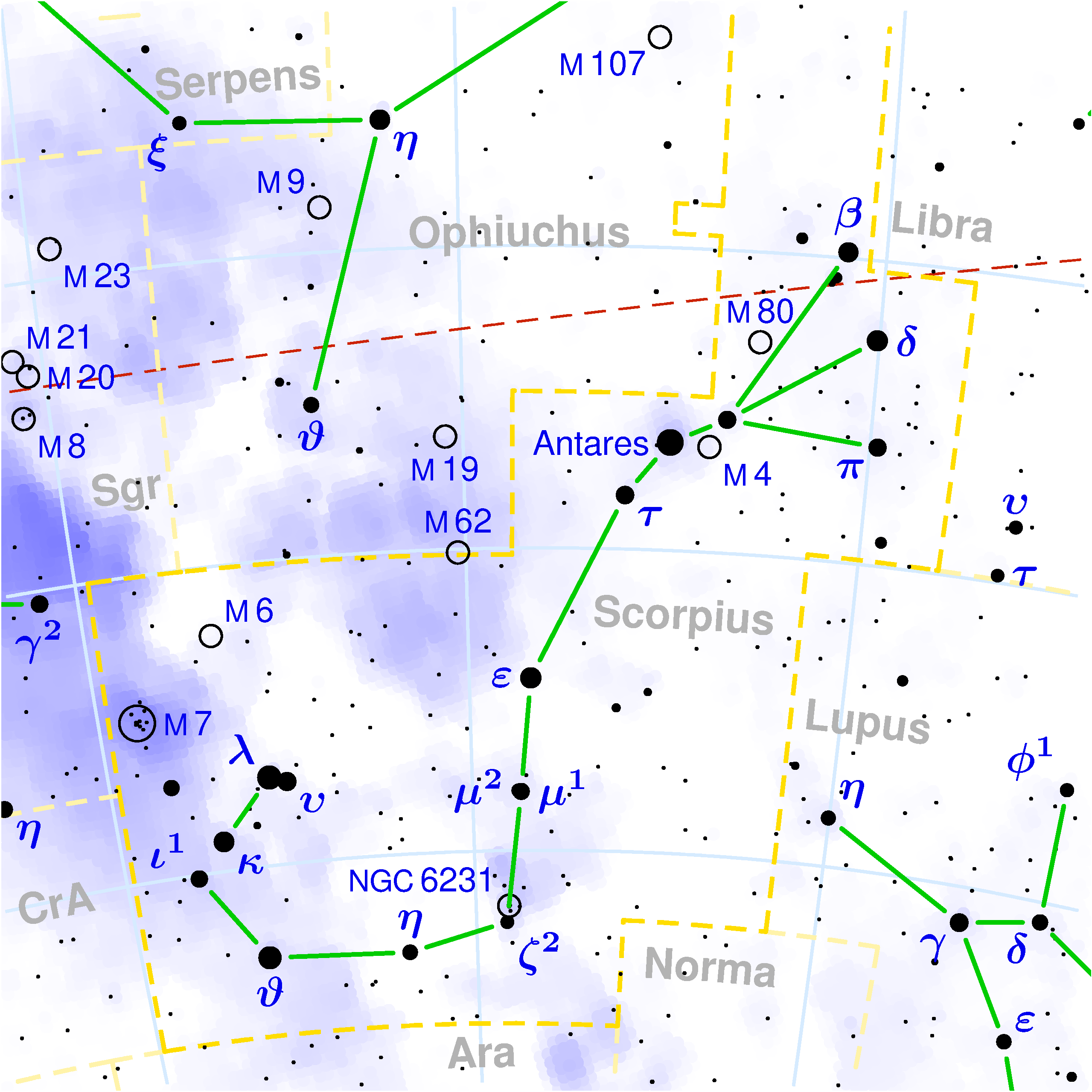
The constellation Scorpius, known in Polynesia as Māui's fishhook.

The great fish-hook of Māui is called Manaiakalani, and it is baited with the wing of Hina's pet bird, the ʻalae. Māui is said to have created Hawaii's islands by tricking his brothers. He convinced them to take him out fishing, but caught his hook on the ocean floor. He told his brothers that he had caught a big fish and told them to paddle as hard as they could. His brothers paddled with all their might, and being intent with their effort, did not notice the island rising behind them. Māui repeated this trick several times, creating the Hawaiian Islands (Tregear 1891:236).

Another tradition states that as Māui planted his hook at Hamakua to fish up the god of fish, Pimoe, Māui ordered his brethren not to look back, or the expedition would fail. Hina, in the shape of a baling-gourd, appeared at the surface of the water, and Māui unwittingly grasped the gourd and placed it in front of his seat. Suddenly, there appeared a beautiful woman whose beauty none could resist, and so the brothers looked behind them to watch the beautiful water-goddess. The line parted, Hina disappeared, and the effort to unite the chain of islands into one solid unit failed.

=== Restraining the Sun ===
Māui's next feat was to stop the sun from moving so fast. His mother Hina complained that her kapa (bark cloth) was unable to dry because the days were so short. Māui climbed to the mountain Hale-a-ka-lā (house of the sun) and lassoed the sun’s rays as the sun came up, using a rope made from his sister's hair. The sun plead for life and agreed that the days shall be long in summer and short in winter (Pukui, Elbert, & Mookini 1974:36).

In another version, Hina sends him to a big wiliwili tree where he found his old blind grandmother setting out bananas and steals them one by one until she recognised him and agreed to help him. He sat by the trunk of the tree to rope the sun (Beckwith 1970:230). The constellation Māui's fishhook (known in the West as Scorpio) was named after this.

=== Fisherman ===
Māui would go fishing in the broken coral reefs below Haleakala with his brothers. Māui was a poor fisherman; even though he had a magical hook that could catch anything, he did not use it for ordinary tasks. Māui's brothers would sometimes tease him for the small amount of fish that he would bring in, but Māui would get them back by playing tricks on them.

The song of Kualii, of Hawaii, Sandwich Islands

[10]

[15]

[20]

Original

Ka makau nui a Maui,
O Manaiakalani,

Kona aho, hilo honua ke kaa,

Hau hia amoamo Kauiki.

Hanaiakamalama,
Ka maunu ka alae a Hina

Kuaa ilalo i Hawaii,
Kahihi ka pu make naoa,

Ka ina Nonononuiakea,

E malana iluna i ka ilikai.

Huna e Hina i ka eheu o ka alae

Wahia ka papa ia Laka,
Ahaina ilalo ia Kea.

Ai mai ka ia o ka ulua makele,

—He mele no Kualii, c. 1700 A.D.

Westervelt (1910)

Oh the great fish hook of Māui!
Manai-i-ka-lani 'Made fast to the heavens' –
its name;
An earth-twisted cord ties the hook.

Engulfed from the lofty Kauiki.

Its bait the red billed Alae,
The bird made sacred to Hina.
It sinks far down to Hawaii,
Struggling and painfully dying.

Caught is the land under the water,

Floated up, up to the surface,

But Hina hid a wing of the bird

And broke the land under the water.

Below, was the bait snatched away
And eaten at once–by the fishes,
The Ulua of the deep muddy places.

—Chant of Kualii, about A. D. 1700.

Lyons (1893)

The great fish-hook of Maui,
Manaiakalani,

The whole earth was the fish-line
bound by the knot,
Kauiki bound to the mainland and
towering high.

Hanaiakamalama (lived there).
The alae of Hina was the bait

(of the fish-hook) let down to Hawaii.
Tangled with the bait into a bitter
death,
Lifting up the very base of the
island;
Drawing it up to the surface of the
sea.
Hidden by Hina were the wings of
the alae.
But broken was the table of Laka.
And the hook carried far down to
Kea.

The fish seized the bait–the fat
large ulua.

—A song for Kualii, c. 1700 A.D.

=== Lifting the sky ===
One day, Māui realized that men were being constrained by the sky. The sky was too low and people were not able to stand upright. Māui felt terrible when he saw the people of Earth suffering from this and wanted to help. So Māui searched for his father in order to help him raise the sky so that the men would not suffer from the falling sky.

Māui traveled to the town Lahaina in order to meet his father and push the sky up. Māui then lay parallel to the sky in order to brace himself and push the sky up with his great power. Māui then gave the signal to his father to start pushing the sky up as well, and the strength of father and son together was able to push the sky up high enough for the people of the earth to be able to continue doing daily tasks. Some say if Māui and his father, Ru, had not worked together, the sky would have fallen completely and made the earth uninhabitable for humans. Thus, they saved mankind.

=== Defeating the Long Eel ===
After Māui had fished up the islands, he began to wonder what was actually on these islands. He then traveled to the different islands and realised that they were all inhabitable. There were kapa houses but with no one living inside of them. The Ahupua'a was completely deserted, with no one inhabiting it at all.

Māui learned a lot of new lessons while visiting these new islands, so he decided to return home and live with respect to the fashion of the new houses he had seen on the islands. Māui then pursued Hina and made her his wife. She was living in a thatched house at the time, of which she took very good care.

One day Hina went down to the river bank to fetch some water for Māui and herself. Hina encountered the Long Eel Tuna at the bank, and Tuna struck her and covered her with slime. Hina was able to escape back to the house but did not tell Māui what had just happened. But the next day it happened again and Hina told Māui. Māui then ventured to the banks to find and kill Tuna.

Māui was very flustered and was going to punish the long eel, so then he laid out traps in order for the eel to come out of hiding. When Tuna came out of hiding, Māui pulled out his stone axe and killed Tuna. The Long Eel had been causing trouble to a lot of the townsfolk, but thanks to Māui they were all safe now. Then Māui buried Tuna, causing a palm tree to grow and creating the first coconuts.

== In popular culture ==
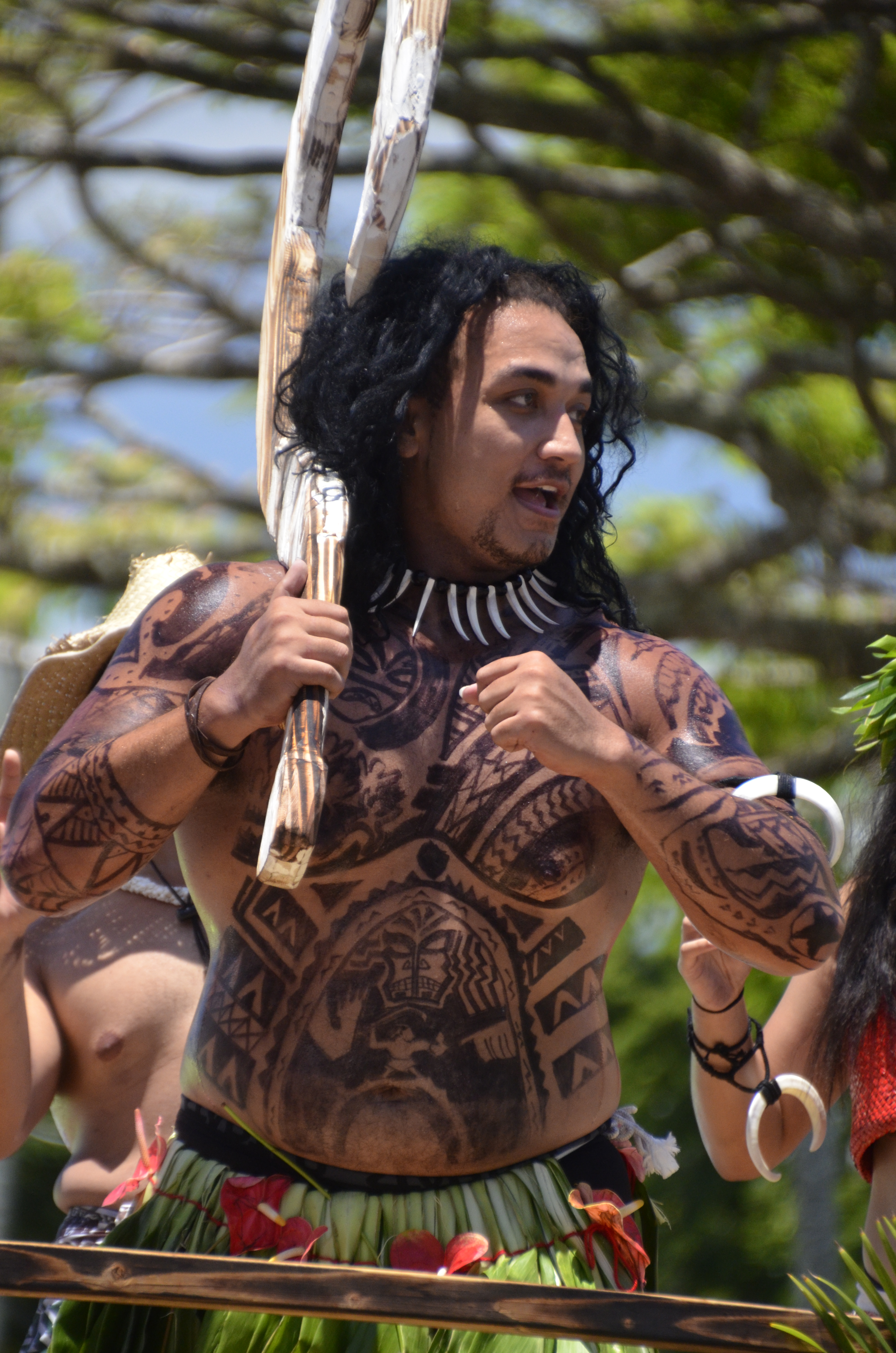
Participant of the Merrie Monarch Parade in Hilo performs as demigod Māui

In the 2016 Disney computer-animated musical film Moana, the demigod Maui is voiced by Dwayne Johnson. Abandoned by his human parents as a baby, the gods took pity on him and made him a demigod and gave him a magic fish hook that gives him the ability to shapeshift. He went on to perform miracles to win back the love of humanity, each of which earned him an animated tattoo. He is fabled to have stolen the heart of Te Fiti, a powerful island goddess who creates life. The protagonist of the film, Moana, persuades him to help her return it. In his song "You're Welcome," composed by Lin-Manuel Miranda, Maui mentions and takes credit for several of the deeds he is credited with in folklore. In the song "Shiny" composed by Lin-Manuel Miranda and Mark Mancina, Tamatoa called Maui "Ya little semi-demi-mini-god". This version of Maui incorporates elements of the Māui from Māori mythology and other Polynesian narratives.

Maui was also the subject of Israel Kamakawiwo'ole's song "Maui Hawaiian Sup'pa Man" in his most well-known album, Facing Future, which is the highest selling Hawaiian album of all time.

== See also ==
- Maui (Mangarevan mythology)
- Māui (Māori mythology)
- Maui (Tahitian mythology)
- Maui (Tongan mythology)
- Tiʻitiʻi
- Ghosts in Polynesian culture
- Polynesian explorers of the Pacific, historically attested travellers
- Polynesian navigation

== Notes ==
=== Bibliography ===
- Dixon, Roland B. (1916). "Part I: Polynesia, Chapter II: The Maui Cycle". The Mythology of All Races: Volume 9, Oceanic. Boston, Massachusetts: Marshall Jones Company. pp. 41–56.
- Westervelt, W. D. (1910). Legends of Ma-ui—A demi god of Polynesia and of his mother Hina. Honolulu, Hawaii: The Hawaiian Gazette Co., Ltd.
