= Ponaturi =

Māori legendary creatures

In Māori mythology, the Ponaturi are a group of hostile creatures (goblins) who live in a land beneath the sea by day, returning to shore each evening to sleep. They dread daylight, which is fatal to them. They appear in a number of stories, including:

- a story of Tāwhaki. The Ponaturi kill Tāwhaki's father Hemā, and carry his body away. They also capture Urutonga, Tāwhaki's mother, whom they put to work as the doorkeeper of their house Manawa-Tāne. In revenge, Tāwhaki and Urutonga block up all the holes of the house to make the Ponaturi think that it is still night. They then suddenly let in the rays of the sun, and all the dreadful creatures are destroyed (Tregear 1891:206, 350).

- a story of the hero Rātā. The Ponaturi carry off his father's bones and use them to beat time when as they practice their magical arts. Rātā hides himself, learns their incantations, and recites a more powerful spell called Titikura. He then attacks them, kills their priests, and recaptures his father's bones. The Ponaturi regroup and chase Rātā, but with the aid of his warriors and his powerful incantations he defeats and kills a thousand of them (Tregear 1891:350).

== Kanae ==
The kanae (or grey mullet) is represented as a companion of the Ponaturi in another version of Tāwhaki (Grey 1956:51). When the Ponaturi come up out of the water to their house Manawa-Tāne, Kanae comes with them. Tāwhaki and Karihi kill all the Ponaturi, in revenge for the death of Hemā, but the mullet escapes by leaping again and again until it gets back to the sea (Craig 1989:99, Grey 1855:40, Tregear 1891:122).

In the story of Ruapupuke (or Rua-te-pupuke), the kanae is associated with similar creatures, the horde of Tangaroa, which are not overtly named as Ponaturi:

Ruapupuke is a chief who lives by the sea. Ruapupuke's young son is drowned. Tangaroa takes the child to the bottom of the sea and makes him into a tekoteko (carved figure) on the ridge-pole of his house, above the door. The father dives to the bottom of the sea, and finds the house, but it is empty. He meets Hinematikotai, a woman who tells him that the inhabitants will return at sunset to sleep, and that if he lets in the daylight it will kill them. So the inhabitants are killed, and Ruapupuke burns the house, taking some of the carvings back with him to use as a model for carving in the human world (Tregear 1891:350)
