= Te Uira =

- Atua of lightning
- Gender: Male
- Region: New Zealand
- Ethnic group: Māori
- Offspring: Te Kanapu

Te Uira is an atua who personifies lightning in Māori mythology. Te Uira's child Te Kanapu, grandparent of Whaitiri, is also a personification of lightning.

== See also ==
- Tāwhaki
- Tāwhirimātea
