= Aku-Aku (mythology) =

Spirits of the dead in Rapa Nui mythology

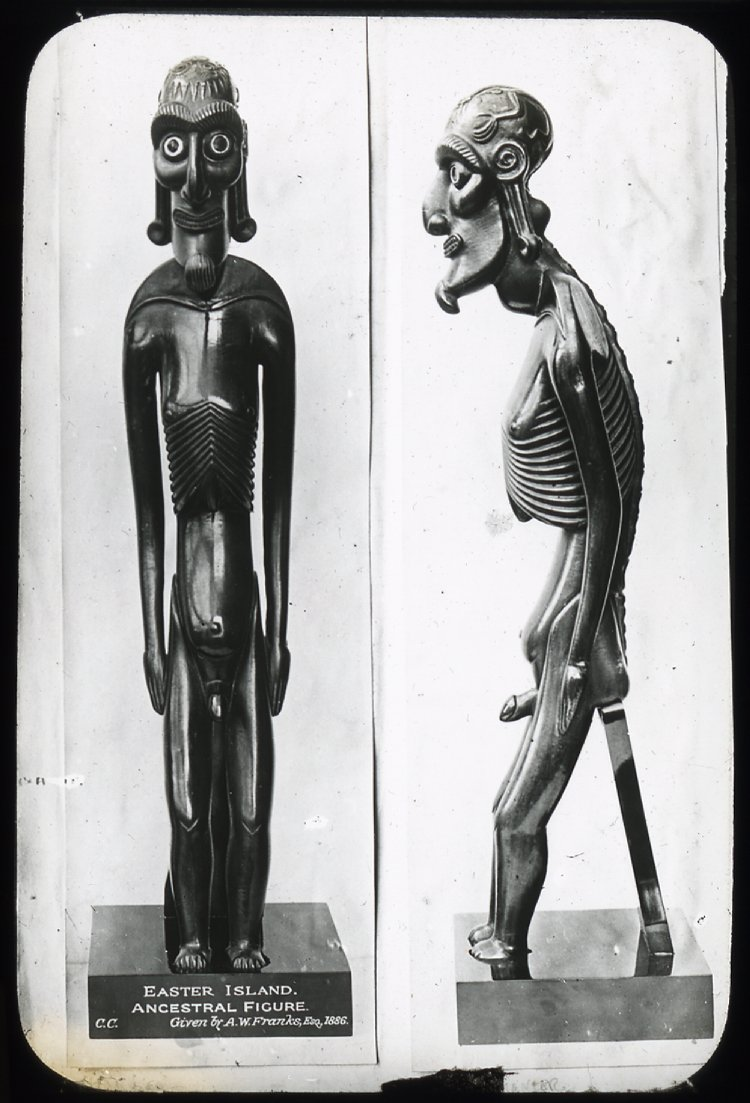
Wooden kavakava (carved figurines) representing Aku-Aku

Aku-Aku ('Devil', 'Ghost' or 'Spirit'), also known as Aku, Akuaku or Varua, are humanoid spirits in Rapa Nui mythology of the Easter Island.

Aku-Aku are spirits of the dead, but they are not immortal and can be disposed of. They can be of either sex, and different Aku-Aku are associated with particular areas of the Easter Island. Some of the Aku-Aku are deified. They originally arrived onto the island with Hotu Matuꞌa, the legendary first settler of Easter Island. The original group of Aku-Aku who arrived with Hotu Matuꞌa numbered around 90, and were generally cannibalistic in nature.

Specific Aku-Aku include:

- Uka-o-hoheru, female, who married the mortal Tupahotu
- Kava-ara and Kava-tua, females, who captured the mortal Uré-a-hohové until he was saved by another old Aku-Aku
- Mata-wara-ware and Papai-a-taki-vera, husband and wife, who capture human souls at night which would lead to their deaths
- Two Aku-Aku who were visited by Tu’u Koihu, son of Hotu Matuꞌa

Islanders who could communicate with Aku-Aku are known as koromaké or iva-atua. There were stories of iva-atuas being employed to dispose of particularly violent Aku-Aku. Aku-Aku were not particularly worshiped, but they were acknowledged before a meal was taken. It was said that Aku-Aku live off the aroma of a meal. A 'well-fed' and friendly Aku-Aku would participate in household chores for a family. When entering caves, which were thought to be their homes, ceremonial rituals such as umu tahu can be performed to ward off bad luck or misfortune.
