= Tangotango =

Woman in Māori mythology

- Other names: Tango-tango; Hāpai; Po-tangotango

In Māori mythology, Tangotango (sometimes called Tango-tango or Hāpai) was a celestial woman who fell in love with the great hero Tāwhaki and came to earth to become his wife. She also may have been called Po-tangotango ("the very dark")

== Mythology ==
Tangotango would sneak into Tāwhaki's bed every night and be gone by morning. When she fell pregnant they began their relationship properly, and she bore him a daughter named Arahuta. When Tāwhaki took Arahuta to the stream to wash her, he remarked "Faugh, how badly the little thing smells". Tangotango was distraught that he would speak about their daughter like that, and she returned to heaven with Arahuta. Tāwhaki and his brother set out on a great adventure to find them. They are directed to where Tangotango is staying by an old blind woman Tāwhaki then disguises himself with enchantments to look like an old man in order to trick Tangotango's brother into letting him in. Tangotango grows suspicious of him, and when she questions him he reveals his true identity. Tāwhaki requests that he be allowed to perform the traditional ceremonies for newborns of nobles, and Tangotango consents.

Another legend refers to Po-tangotango, which may be a different name for the same figure. In this version, she is Tāwhaki's sister-in-law rather than his wife.
