= International Association for Dental, Oral, and Craniofacial Research =

Professional dental research association

- Formation: 1920
- Founded at: New York
- Type: Learned society
- Headquarters: 1619 Duke Street, Alexandria, VA
- Members: 9,600+ (2025)
- Official language: English
- President: Pamela Yelick (2025)
- Website: www.iadr.org

The International Association for Dental, Oral, and Craniofacial Research (IADR) is a professional association, founded in 1920 by William Gies as the International Association of Dental Research, that focuses on research in the field of dentistry. The aim of this association by constitution is to promote research in all fields of oral and related sciences, to encourage improvements in methods for the prevention and treatment of oral and dental disease, to improve the oral health of the public through research, and to facilitate cooperation among investigators and the communication of research findings and their implications throughout the world. The Journal of Dental Research (JDR) is the official medical journal of the IADR and the American Association for Dental, Oral, and Craniofacial Research (AADOCR).

In 2023, the name of IADR was expanded to the International Association for Dental, Oral, and Craniofacial Research – while keeping the "IADR" acronym – to better encompass the breadth of science covered by the organization and its members.

== History in Japan ==
The Japanese Division of the IADR was established in 1954. Seiichi Matsumiya, an oral pathologist at Tokyo Dental College, served as president of the Japanese Division from 1959 to 1961 and again from 1969 to 1971.

As a member of the IADR International Relations Committee, Matsumiya organized the Pan-Pacific Congress of Dental Research to promote scientific exchange in the Asia-Pacific region. The first congress was held in Tokyo from 14 to 16 April 1969, with Matsumiya serving as president of the organizing committee.

== Organization ==
=== Regions ===
IADR is organized into five regions, each consisting of multiple divisions and/or sections.

- Africa/Middle East Region (AMER)
- Asia/Pacific Region (APR)
- Latin American Region (LAR)
- North American Region (NAR)
- Pan European Region (PER)

== See also ==
- List of learned societies
