= Kaitangata Mine disaster =

Mining accident in New Zealand

Coordinates: 46.2669°S 169.8478°E

The Kaitangata Mine disaster was one of New Zealand's early industrial disasters and the first of its kind in New Zealand. Thirty-four miners lost their lives at 8am on 21 February 1879 in an underground explosion at Kaitangata in South Otago.

== Kaitangata Mine ==
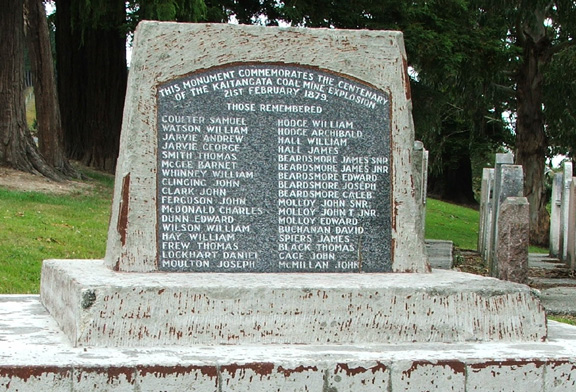
Memorial to the 1879 mining disaster

Coal was discovered in the area around near Kaitangata in the late 1840s and William Aitchinson began extracting coal near Kaitangata in 1862. In 1871 he leased his mine to John Thompson of Balclutha. In September 1872 Thompson and Aitchenson reached agreement to raise capital to expand their mining operation by way of a new company, the Kaitangata Coal Mining Company. The underground mine produced sub-bituminous coal of a high quality. In 1875, the Company merged with the recently created Kaitangata Railway Company to become the Kaitangata Railway and Coal Company Ltd. Through late 1875 and early 1876 the mine was expanded with additional shafts being driven in anticipation of the new railway. Once the railway had been completed the company announced further expansion intentions with a desire by 1877 to bring production up to 100 tons per week. There were 41 men employed at the mine in mid-1877.

On 8 September 1878 there was a small explosion in the mine. The Manager Mr Thorne was burnt by the explosion while he was inspecting a minor rock fall. Two other miners suffered from minor injuries. At that time it was thought that the coal in New Zealand was not prone to emit gas and such precautions as were considered necessary were in place.

== Accident ==
At 8am on 21 February 1879 there was an explosion at the Kaitangata mine. The force of the explosion was enough to blow Edward Dunn, who was entering the drive with a horse, 50 yards clear killing him. Six empty coal trucks were also projected a similar distance from the drive. A building for storing tools near the mine entrance was back several yards and partially demolished by some of the coal trucks. A second boy James Hawke, who was near the entrance, and blown a similar distance to Dunn escaped serious injury. Dense smoke was seen issuing from the mine. Initially it was thought that there were only 36 men inside the mine at the time.

== Rescue attempts ==
Immediately after the explosion the station master, J B Griffen, sent the company's train to Balclutha to get Dr Smith. He arrived on the scene some 25 minutes later. While this was happening, men from the neighbouring mines gathered and organised a group of volunteers to either rescue the miners or recover their bodies. Fire damp initially prevented rescuers from entering the mine. Those first entering the mine were W Shore, R M Sewell, Mr Aitcheson, and some unnamed others. They found two falls in the mine, which had been caused by the explosion. Also the brattices which allowed air circulation had been destroyed and temporary canvas ones needed to be installed prior to further searching. Several of those installing the canvas ones were almost suffocated. The condition in the mine remained dangerous and those working in it had to do so in shifts because of the impact of after damp. All hope of finding the miners alive was abandoned at this point.

The Company Manager, James Davidson, Mr Watson, and the mining engineer Charles Twinning were in Dunedin when the explosion occurred and on learning of it took the 11:25am train to Stirling. On the information they had when they left Dunedin they had no idea of the scale of the disaster until the arrived at Stirling. There they were informed that some 30 or more men, including the mine Manager William Hodge were in the mine when the explosion occurred and that none were likely to be alive.

By 12pm one body and the youngest person killed, 14-year-old Charles McDonald, was recovered from the mine but he could only be identified by his clothing as he was so badly burnt. Two more, William Hay and Edward Beardsmore were recovered by 12:25pm. James Beardsmore Junior was the next one recovered. All three had been killed by the after damp. Thomas Black, George Jarvie, Thomas Frew, and Caleb Beardsmore were next, bringing the total to 8 by 1:35pm. At the same time Mr Farra, a Company Director, telegraphed the Company Secretary, Mr Horkins to get 20 Green Island miners to assist in recovery operations. Constable Warren telegraphed at 1:40pm stating that in addition to the 8 bodies recovered another 28 were still in the mine. None were expected to be alive. The scene at the mine entrance at 1:30pm was described as lamentable with weeping women and children at the scene.

A morgue was set up at Jenkin's hotel, with Constable Warring taking charge of the bodies as they emerged. The rescuers had to take a break at 1:30pm due to the mine air being too contaminated. Constable Warren telegraphed at 1:40pm stating that in addition to the 8 bodies recovered another 28 were still in the mine. After a short time work resumed again and by 7pm another 16 bodies were removed from the mine - R Hall and his brother J Hall, David Buchanan, James Molloy and his two sons John and Edward Molloy, James Beardsmore (senior), William Whinney, Joseph Beardsmore, Joseph Morton, Barney McGee, James Clinning, William Hodge the Mine Manager, William S Wilson, and William Watson. Four other bodies were sighted.

Davidson and Twinning arrived during the afternoon and Twinning was appointed by Davidson to manage the operations. Among the rescuers Messrs Shore, Sewell, Aitcheson, William Blain, Thomas Knowles, John Gray, John McFarlane of Wangaloa, the Bissetts - a father and two sons, William Law, Joseph Robertson, and John Nelson were singled out for praise. To this list were later added J Brown, James Wilson, Robert Wilson, Charles Samson, Michael Muir, George Hunter, Messrs Hennessy and Richardson, William Wilson, Adam Harris, Alexander Cook, John Tiffen, Hugh Wilson, James McIvor, William Hodgkiss, Andrew Falkener, and Stephen Russell.

At 6:45pm Charles Samson the Mayor of Green Island and 24 miners from the Green Island mines arrived by special train to assist. Thomas Logan, a quartz miner joined the group of miners to assist. Archibald (Archie) Hodge the Deputy Mine Manager was noted to be among those not yet found. Most of the bodies had been found close to the main air intake about 300 yards from the entrance. They were thought to have suffocated. By the end of the day 30 bodies had been recovered and 4 were known to be still missing. The names of the remaining miners killed were Samuel Coulter, James Spiers, Andrew Jarvie, Thomas Smith, John Gage, John Clark, John Ferguson, Robert McMillan, and Daniel Lockhart. Andrew Jarvie was the only one of this group killed by the blast. The rest died of asphyxiation.

The Presbyterian and Anglican Ministers Reverends Allan and Carr, had arrived in the afternoon to assist the grieving families and Police Commissioner Thomas Weldon, Inspector Moore, and a number of officers arrived to assist Constable Warren. Reverends Ronaldson and Chisholm from Milton also arrived to assist the grieving. Allan, Ronaldson, Chisholm and the Roman Catholic Priest Father Larkins officiate at the funeral the following day.

Twenty of the miners were married and several were new arrivals, having arrived the day before on the steamer Wellington. On the day of the explosion, 47 men were employed at the mine. One miner who had overslept, C Hunter, escaped death.

== The location and cause of the explosion ==
Those who had signs of physical injury were at the mine entrance or in its vicinity. The remainder of those killed had been working in the new working and had no apparent physical injuries. Because of this a conclusion was reached that seat of the explosion had been in the area near the mines entrance and most probably in the area of the old workings. Conclusive evidence for this theory had been found when Archibald Hodge's mangled body had been found within the old workings. The old workings were locked off by a door from the main mine. Hodge had, for some reason opened the door and entered this area. Fire damp was probably present and because Hodge was using a naked flame to light his path, ignited it and caused the catastrophic explosion. There were two suggested reasons for Hodge entering this dangerous area. One was that he wanted to remove some disused rails lying in the old workings and the other was he was eccentric and considered the old working as an area where there was some mystery to be unraveled.

== Coroners Court ==
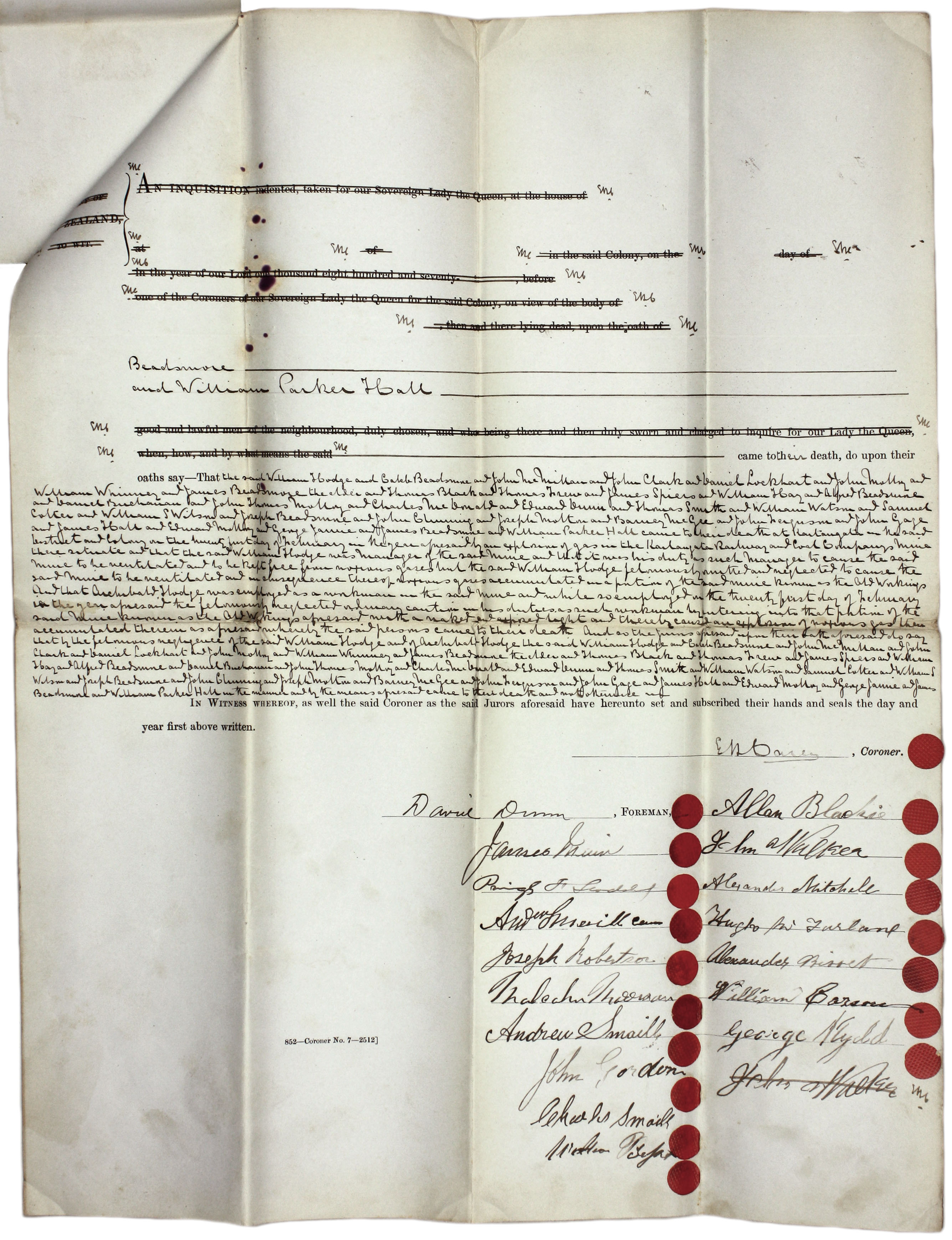
Inquest report for one of the victims

A Coroners Court was convened at the Bridge Hotel Kaitangata at 12:20pm on Saturday 22 February to determine the cause of the deaths under Edgar Hall Carew RM of Milton, Coroner. A jury of 16 had been selected. They were Alexander Mitchell, David Dunn - the jury foreman, John Walker, William Bissett, William Carson, George Kidd, Hugh McFarlane, John Gordon, Allan Blackie, Charles Smaill, Andrew Smaill, Joseph Robertson, Alexander Bissett, P F Stoddart, James Muir, and Malcolm Morrison. Police Commissioner Weldon and Inspector Moore were also in attendance.

The court began with the identification of the bodies by Thomas Knowles - Pit Headman, Joseph Robertson, David Dunn, and John McDonald. Only Archie Hodge and Jarvie remained unidentified at the end of the day. The hearing recommenced on the Monday at 11am when the remaining bodies identified. Charles Edward Twining, a qualified colliary manager and the mining surveyor with the Company was called to give evidence. He advised that in his opinion the mine should have had a second outlet and had recommended it. He stated that in England there was a requirement that there should be two outlets as a minimum, the air vent did not count as an outlet. There should also have been a barometer in the mine and outside to determine the presence of bad air. Locked lamps or safety lamps were required when fire damp was suspected as being present. William Hodge and Beardsmore had advised Twining about 2 weeks before the explosion of fire damp being present in the new working. Twining checked but found none. An inspection of the mine was carried out on 1 February by Mr Cox, the Government Assistant Geologist and Mr Binnes the Government Coal Inspector. Binnes drew out plans for the Mine Manager on how best to work the mine.

After Twining was heard, Robert Grigor - Land Surveyor took the stand followed by William Wilson, one of the miners. Wilson stated that fire damp had been present in the mine from time to time since October 1878. Precautions had been taken and the mine was considered reasonably safe. He advised that in England areas of old working were usually bricked off and sealed to prevent build ups of fire damp - entering that area of the mine was considered unsafe, although Archie Hodge had been into the area to get some rails on occasion. He also recalled that Andrew Javie had been burnt in a minor explosion about three months earlier at the east end of the workings. The miners used naked lights unlike the English miners who used the safety lamps. Wilson considered that the most likely source of the explosion was the old workings as there would not enough buildup of fire damp in new workings to cause an explosion of such magnitude. John Irving, another miner gave a similar testimony and suggested that Hodge may have entered the old area to find more rails. He also said that he did not think Hodge was able to assess the danger in the old workings. The hearing was then adjourned.

The hearing recommenced on Monday 3 March with Joseph Robertson identifying the body of William Parker Hall. He was followed by Thomas Knowles who was working at the mine site on the 21st. He described the explosion. Knowles had also talked to Archie Hodge who he said had got some rails for Andrew Jarvie and Walter Hay to lay a new road 300 yards opposite the old workings. Hodge had told him that he needed a pair of turnings. As there were none outside, Knowles thought Hodge would have gone in to the old workings to retrieve some. Given the time between talking to Hodge and the explosion (about 10 minutes) Knowles thought Hodge had probably entered the old workings and caused the explosion.

Next on the stand was Charles Samson, a Director of the Green Island Coal Company and Manager of the Abbotsfield Coal Mine. Samson considered the mine should have had a second access and that the old workings should have been sealed off, as was the practice in England. He considered that accessing the old workings, given the presence of fire damp in the mine, was reckless. Samson was followed by Samual Herbert Cox, New Zealand Government Inspector of Mines and holder of a Competency Certificate from the London School of Mines. The Mine Manager, Hodge, had informed him in February that there was no fire damp present in the mine. Binns, the Coal Inspector had been through the old workings about 8 days earlier and had not reported any fire damp present. He did not think Hodge was experienced enough to be a Mine Manager without supervision. Samson also stated that old workings should only be accessed with a safety lamp.

After these witnesses two of the company officers took the stand, James Davidson - General Manager and Matthew William Hawkings - Company Secretary. Safety lamps had been ordered for the mine and a barometer had been provided to Hodge. The hearing was then adjourned till the next week.

On resumption of the hearing on 10 March William Shore - Manager of the No1 Kaitangata Mine took the stand. Shore had found Archie Jarvis' body in the old workings. He was also certain that the explosion had been caused in these workings. George Jonathan Binns, a qualified mining engineer and viewer of coal for the New Zealand Government took the stand next. He had inspected the old workings and considered that they had the potential to be dangerous. He had informed Hodge. Hodge had told him on 24 January that no gas was present in the mine. If gas was present in the mine then the old working should have been sealed off. The alternative and what had happened was gross negligence on behalf of the Mine Manager. Binns did not have the authority to require the Mine Manager to take any action. He did report the situation to his superiors and had, after the explosion, found that the gas had again built up to dangerous levels in the old workings. Binns was later recalled and asked if the gas in the old workings could have come from the new ones. He advised that this was not likely and that it was from the old workings.

Allan Holmes, Company Director, took the stand following Binns. He was asked whether he knew about the gas. He said that Holmes had told him in either July or August 1878. Hodge had taken quite a casual attitude to it and Holmes had asked him to institute safety lamps. Beardsmore had been tasked with inspecting the mine for fire damp prior to letting the men enter the mine. In January 1879 safety lamps had been ordered. After his evidence the Coroner provided instructions to the jury, before they retired to consider their verdict, on what they needed to determine. After 50 minutes the jury returned with a finding:

First, your Worship, the Jury find that Archibald Hodge, through entering the old workings without ordinary precaution and with a naked light, caused an explosion of fire-damp whereby 34 men and boys lost their lives. Second, the Jury find That William Hodge has not used the necessary precautions to prevent an explosion of fire-damp in the mine over which he had the management. As a rider, we add that seeing that there is no law for inspection and supervision in the conduct of mining, we express the necessity of measures being adopted whereby many accidents may in the future be averted.

== Mine Inspectors and legislation ==
Before the Coroner's Court had reached its conclusions a local paper raised the issue of the quality of New Zealand's Mine Inspectors by noting that in England they were highly educated and paid accordingly, while in New Zealand they were only paid £150 per annum. This was later followed by a call on the Government to enforce its mining legislation. The Act in force at the time of the explosion was the Regulation of Mines Act 1874. The Act was only enforcible if the Superintendent of the Province had, by Proclamation published in the New Zealand Gazette declared the Act to be in force in the province. The only alternative was if the Governor had proclaimed a Mining District and Published that in the Gazette. Section 10 of the Act required two openings for egress. Section 36 of the Act also made provision for owners to compensate those injured or killed through negligence.

The Government's response to the disaster was to reasonably promptly issue a Proclamation bringing the Act into force throughout the country on 28 February 1879. Attention in the newspapers of the time turned towards the Directors of the company, notwithstanding the Coroners Court finding negligence by the Hodges. The newspapers pointed out that the Directors had left William Hodge, the Mine Manager, to do pretty much as he liked, had shirked their duty of care, and suggested the Government should examine them. The papers further suggested that the Directors had not done sufficient in determining Hodge's competency. Enabling the Mine inspectors was lauded and more inspectors were called for.

== Shore's Mine ==
After the hearings Thomas Thompson Ritchie wrote to Dr James Hector about the possibility that the gas build up in the old workings could have been caused by new workings in the adjacent No 1 Kaitangata mine of Mr Shore. Ritchie had deduced that water build up in the mine had ceased around the time of the explosion and that there was a cross fault between the two mines which linked to the area in the old workings and which could have caused the gas build up. Shore's mine was at a lower level than the Company's and the gas tended to rise. He also pointed out that the buildup of gas after the explosion was considerably more rapid than would have been expected in the old workings area. Dr Hector agreed with the analysis.

Mr Shore rebutted the claim, stating that his mine was 500 yards away and 450 (yards or feet) below the Companies mine. He further stated that there was no reliable evidence to supported Ritchie and Hector's assertion and that gas transfer through a fault at that distance was inconsistent with evidence from other mine faults. Shore further pointed out that the ventilation system at the Companies mine had not been operational since the explosion and that it was more likely that a lack of ventilation was the cause of the buildup given that fire damp was known to be present in the mine.

== Relief fund ==
A relief fund was set up after the disaster to assist the miners' widows. Among those donating were Chinese miners from the Adam's Flat gold diggings, who gave 10 shillings each on average.
