= Whaitiri =

Māori goddesses

- Atua of thunder
- Gender: Female
- Region: New Zealand
- Ethnic group: Māori
- Consort: Kaitangata
- Offspring: Hemā

Whaitiri is a female atua and personification of thunder in Māori mythology. She is the grandmother of Tāwhaki and Karihi. Whaitiri is the granddaughter of Te Kanapu, son of Te Uira, both of whom are personified forms of lightning. Another more primary atua of thunder, a male, is Tāwhirimātea.

== Marries Kaitangata ==
Whaitiri is a fearsome figure, fond of cannibalism. When she hears of a mortal named Kaitangata (man-eater), she is certain he will make a fine husband for her. She comes down to earth and marries him, but is disappointed to learn that he is a gentle person, nothing like his name suggests. Whaitiri kills her favourite slave, Anonokia, takes out her heart and liver, and offers them to Kaitangata as a sign of her affection. He is horrified at the grisly offering.

Kaitangata is a hard worker, spending a lot of time fishing to feed his family. Unfortunately, he has never learned how to make hooks with a barb, and so most of his fish escape. Whaitiri gives him a barbed hook, and he catches a grouper, which she offers to the gods. Whaitiri quickly tires of a diet of fish, so when her husband is away fishing, she takes a net and catches two of her husband's relatives, Tupeke-ti and Tupeke-ta. When Kaitangata returns, she asks him to perform the incantations that are used when human flesh is offered to the gods. He does not know the chants, so she tries to perform them herself, not willing to confess that she is ignorant of the correct words to use. She mumbles nonsense words, before cooking the bodies, cutting them up and gorging herself on the flesh, to the disgust of the villagers. Only the bones are left.

Later, Kaitangata uses the bones to make barbed hooks, and goes fishing. He catches grouper, and gives them to Whaitiri. He does not tell her that he used hooks made from the bones of Tupeke-ti and Tupeke-ta. She eats the fish, and because the fish is infused with the tapu (sacredness) from the bodies of the two men, Whaitiri gradually begins to go blind. At first she is mystified at the reason for this, but eventually she is visited by a woman from the underworld who tells her what has happened.

== Returns to the sky ==
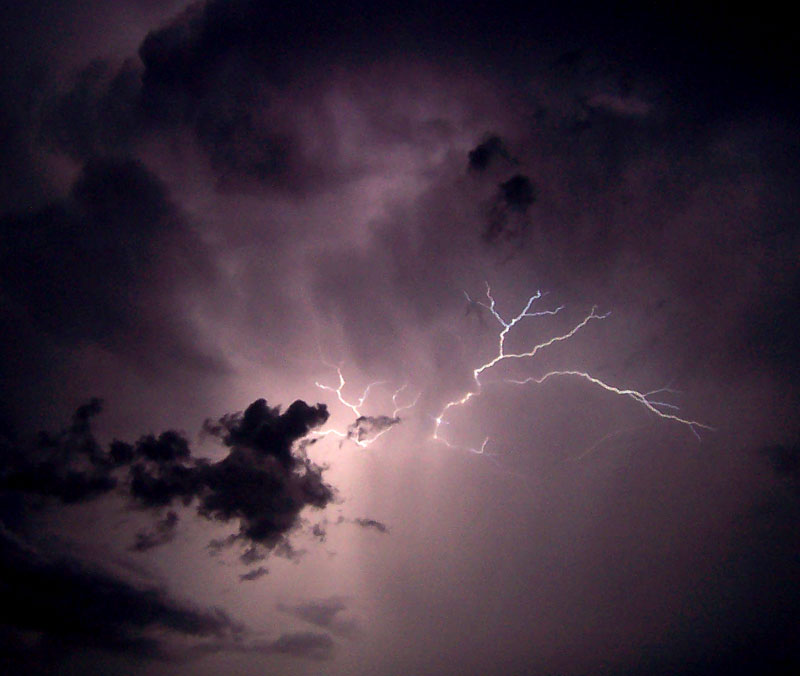
Thunder and lightning are signs of Whaitiri

One day, Whaitiri overhears her husband describe her to two strangers. She is offended when she hears him say that his wife's skin is like the wind, and her heart is as cold as snow. On another occasion, she is ashamed when Kaitangata complains that their children are dirty. She explains to her husband that she is unable to wash her children because she is a sacred being from the heavens, and she tells him for the first time that her name is thunder. She prepares to return to her true home in the heavens, and foretells that her children will follow her one day. She departs in a cloud, leaving her children, one of whom is Hemā.

== Found by her grandsons ==
This is fulfilled when Tāwhaki and Karihi, Hemā's sons, set off to climb up to the sky. At the foot of the ascent they find their grandmother, Whaitiri, now blind, who sits continually counting the tubers of sweet potato or taro that are her only food. The brothers tease her by snatching them away, one by one, and upsetting her count. Eventually, they reveal themselves to her and restore her sight. In return, she gives them advice about how best to make the climb into the sky. Karihi tries first, but makes the error of climbing up the aka taepa, or hanging vine. He is blown violently around by the winds of heaven, and falls to his death. Tāwhaki climbs by the aka matua, or parent vine, recites the right incantations, and reaches the highest of the 10 heavens. There he learns many spells from Tama-i-waho, and marries a woman named Hāpai, or as others say, Maikuku-makaka. They have a son, and according to some versions of the story it is this child who is named Wahieroa(Biggs 1966:450).

== Names and epithets ==
- Waitiri (thunder, thundering water, dialectal)
- Whaitiri (thunder)
- Whaitiri-mātakataka (crashing thunder)
- Waitiri Station, a large Central Otago New Zealand high country ranch. Named after the thundering waters of the Kawarau River. Waitiri Station is the major ranch of the Kawarau Gorge and runs from the Bungy Bridge to the Roaring Meg on SH6. It is a merino sheep station and is run in conjunction with Eastburn Station.
- Waitiri Run (Citroen Rapids) A Grade IV at less than 11,000 cubic feet per second (310 m^{3}/s) and Grade V over 11,000 cubic feet per second (310 m^{3}/s). Length 2 miles (3 km) BIG water, technically simple but intimidating. Waitiri Station provides put and exit access.

== See also ==
- Matakerepō, who is linked with Whaitiri
