= Karihi =

- Gender: Male
- Region: New Zealand
- Ethnic group: Māori

Genealogy
- Parents: Hemā
- Siblings: Tāwhaki

Karihi is a brother or cousin of Tāwhaki in Māori mythology.

His father Hemā was killed by the ponaturi, so Karihi, with his mother and his brother Tāwhaki, killed all but two ponaturi in revenge. They tricked the ponaturi into entering a house, and then locked them in, claiming there was still time before the dawn. They then opened the door after the sun was up, the ponaturi died at the exposure to sunlight.

According to the Ngāi Tahu account, Karihi died when, in his attempt to climb to heaven, he was blown away by the wind of Uru-Tonga. In some versions, Tāwhaki then took the eyes of his younger brother Karihi to their blind grandmother Matakerepo Whaitiri.

According to the Ngāi Tūhoe account of this attempted climb toward heaven Karihi survived. It was Karihi who suggested to his brother that they hide in the thatch of the roof of the house of the ponaturi.
