= ʻAikanaka (mythology) =

Hawaiian mythological chief

- Spouse: Hinahanaiakamalama
- Children: Hemā

In Hawaiian mythology, ʻAikanaka (or ʻAi Kanaka, ʻAikane) is a mortal chief.

His name means "man eater". His father was named Hulumanailani, whilst his mother was named Hinamaikalani.

ʻAikanaka married Hinahanaiakamalama (according to the Ulu genealogy). She gave birth to sons named Hemā and Puna. ʻAikanaka is also depicted to have married the moon goddess lona, who carried ʻAikanaka on her wings.

According to the Ulu genealogy, ʻAikanaka was born about 746 AD.
