= Kaitangata Line =

Railway line in Otago, New Zealand

Map

The Kaitangata Line, also known as the Kaitangata Branch in its first years of operation, was a railway line in Otago, New Zealand. It was built by a private company and was later acquired by the government's Mines Department, and operated from 1876 until 1970. It provided a link from coal mines to the Main South Line, and was never integrated into the network managed by the New Zealand Railways Department, thus although it could be seen as a branch line of the Main South Line, it officially never was.

== History ==
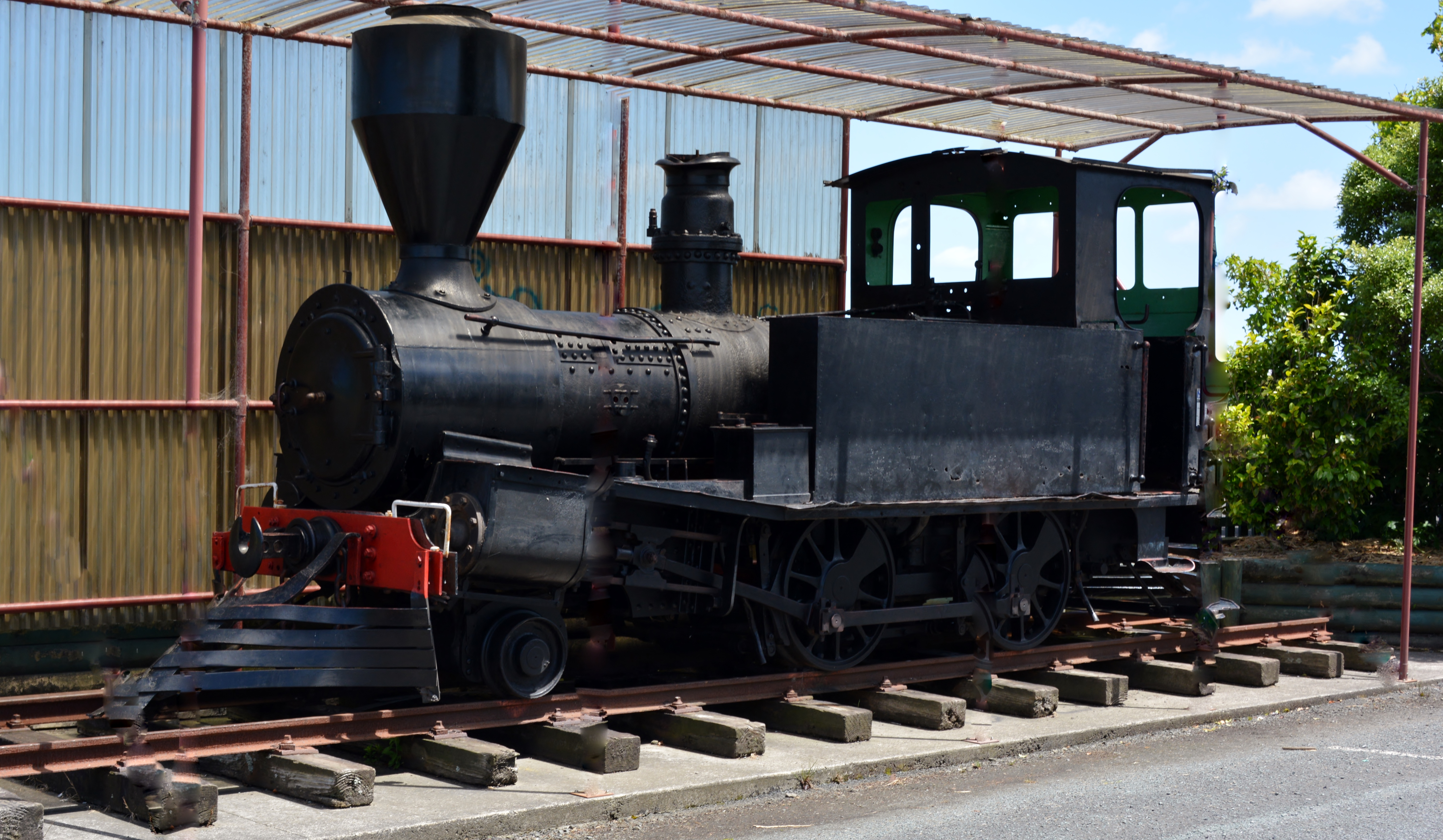
D Class locomotive

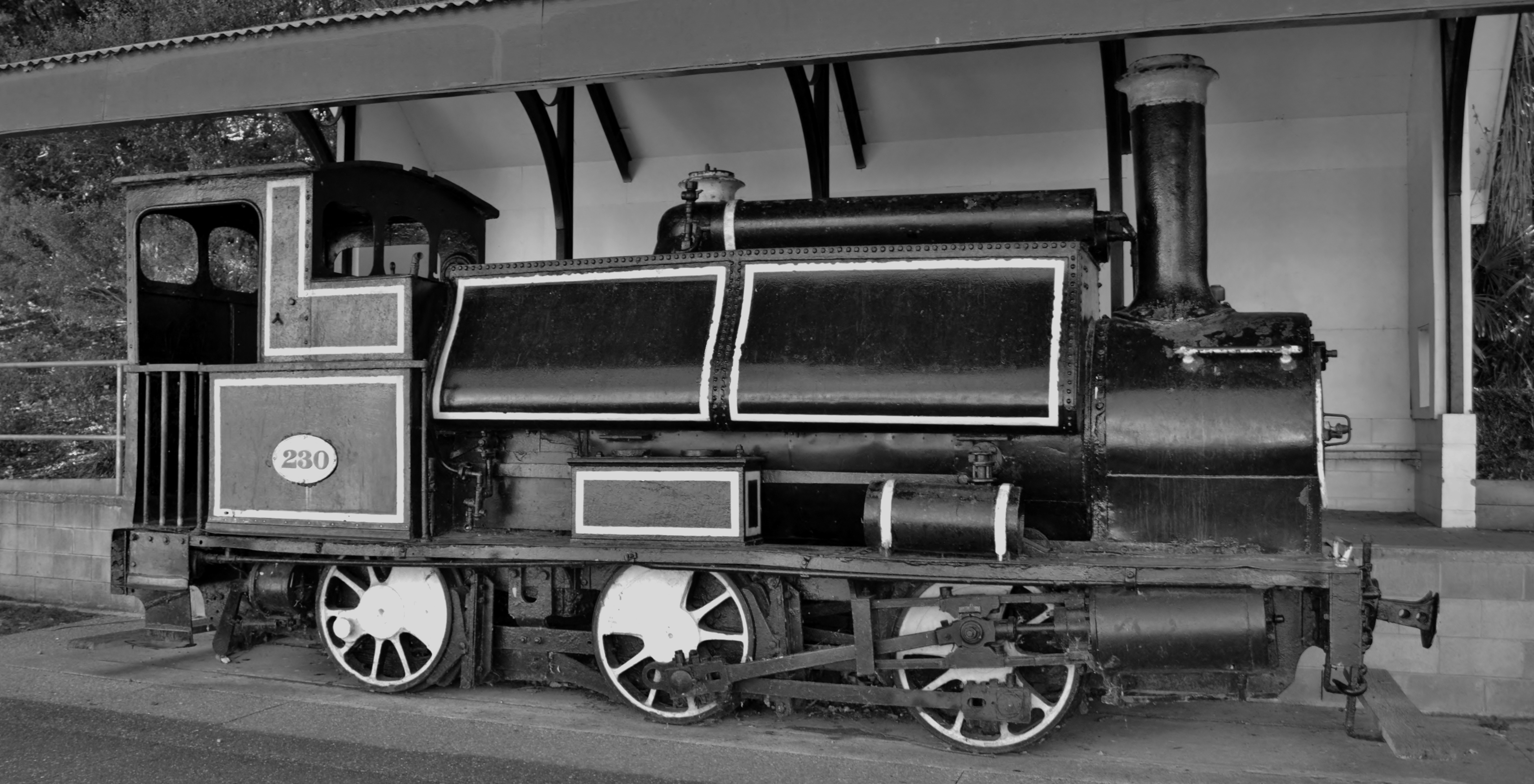
F Class locomotive

=== Background ===
In 1873 local residents petitioned the Provincial Government to construct a Branch Line from the South Island Main Trunk to Ropers Creek near Kaitangata to enable coal to be easily transported from the mines. In 1874 the Provincial Government applied for consent to raise a £27,750 loan to construct the Branch line with an extension as far as Coal Point. This was unsuccessful and as a result the Kaitangata Rail Company began to investigate constructing its own line.

Legislation was required to allow the construction of the railway by the Company. Initially this took the form of an ordinance by the Provincial Government, but this was disallowed by the Governor. Wishing to pursue this, the company pressed the General Assembly for consent. The ordinance was redrafted into a Bill and passed as the Kaitangata Railway and Coal Company Empowering Act 1875. The legislation was passed some months after construction had commenced.

=== Construction ===
On Friday, 26 February 1875 the Kaitangata Rail Company merged with the Kaitangata Coal Company to form the Kaitangata Railway and Coal Company. With the route of the railway from its mine in Kaitangata and to the Main South Line at Stirling, having already been agreed to, fencing contracts were agreed to be called. A sod turning ceremony was carried out near the Kaitangata Creek bridge by Sir J L C Richardson on 19 June 1875. Construction of the line began under a contract let in May 1875, using about 40 Chinese labourers and some Europeans under A Jerusalem Smyth. By September they had completed some 4.5 miles of the rail bed.

The sleepers for the line were locally produced, while the rails came from the Darlington Iron Company (England) and the spikes, bolts, and nuts came from Bayliss, Jones, and Bayliss of Wolverhampton. The New Zealand Government Inspector, Mr G B Bruce of Westminster, checked the quality of these products prior to them being shipped on the Mataura. A locomotive and 25 coal trucks were ordered in September or early October from James Davidson and Co of Dunedin.

By the end of February 1876 the lines had been laid and ballasting commenced. The intention was to open the line for freight and a few weeks later, passenger traffic. Ballasting was completed on 31 March and although the line was considered ready for traffic, its formal opening was announced to be held on 1 May.

By June a goods shed and engine shed were under construction at Kaitangata. The platform had been built, but the station building had yet to be constructed.

== Use ==
The first informal journey on the line was on 8 April when a group of local dignitaries were bought from Balclutha to Kaitangata on the line by the Company. Formal inspection of the new line was carried out by W N Blair, District Engineer, on 22 April. By 20 May passenger and goods trains were running daily on the line. These early trains were Government owned ones as the Company was still waiting for delivery of its own engine and rolling stock.

The formal opening ceremony was on 16 June 1876. About 300 people journeyed by train from Dunedin to attend the opening performed by the Mayor of Dunedin, H J Walker. Andrew Davidson was the conductor on the train. At the ceremony, the company announced its intention to acquire a second engine and run three trains a day on the line. Shares in the Company were selling for £10.

A timetable had been introduced by December 1876 with two trains each day at 10:10 a.m. and 4:55 p.m. On Mondays and Saturdays the trains were at 6:45 a.m. and 7:30 p.m. By March 1877 there were three trains per day at 10:10 a.m., 2:10 p.m., and 4:45 p.m. as had been mooted in when the line was opened. In April the Company announced that it was increasing its freight charges. This met with considerable outcry and a call for the Government to take over ownership on running of the line. The rates being charged by the Company were one shilling 6 pence (1/6) for passengers from Kaitangata to Stirling, 2/6 per ton for grain, and 10/- per truck for firewood. At the meeting Coal was said to be charged at £2 per ton. Shares in the Company had dropped to £7 in value by July. A severe flood in late September 1878 undermined the railway bridge piles at Kaitangata, putting the line out of action. By the end of December the line was back in use.

On 21 February 1879 trains used the line to bring rescue workers and officials to the Kaitangata Mine disaster.

An engine shed. goods shed, and a station building were located at Kaitangata, 5.95 km from the Main South Line. Although the station bore much resemblance to buildings on the national network operated by the Railways Department, the line was never part of its network. Trains were initially operated by the Railways Department on behalf of the private owners and the line appeared in working timetables as the Kaitangata Branch, but by the 1880s, this practice had ceased and private operation took over. Passenger services were provided until 1937. Until 1963, an extension ran down a road to the Castle Hill Mine, and for much of its life the line was operated by both a tank engine built to the design of a D class engine (built by Scott Brothers Ltd, of Christchurch) and an "Improved F" 0-6-0 tank locomotive, constructed in 1896 by Sharp, Stewart & Co.

== Engines ==
The first engines on the line were Government owned. These were followed in July 1876 by the Company's engine Jerusalem constructed by Davidson and Co of Dunedin. By September 1877 the Company still only owned one engine.

== Demise ==
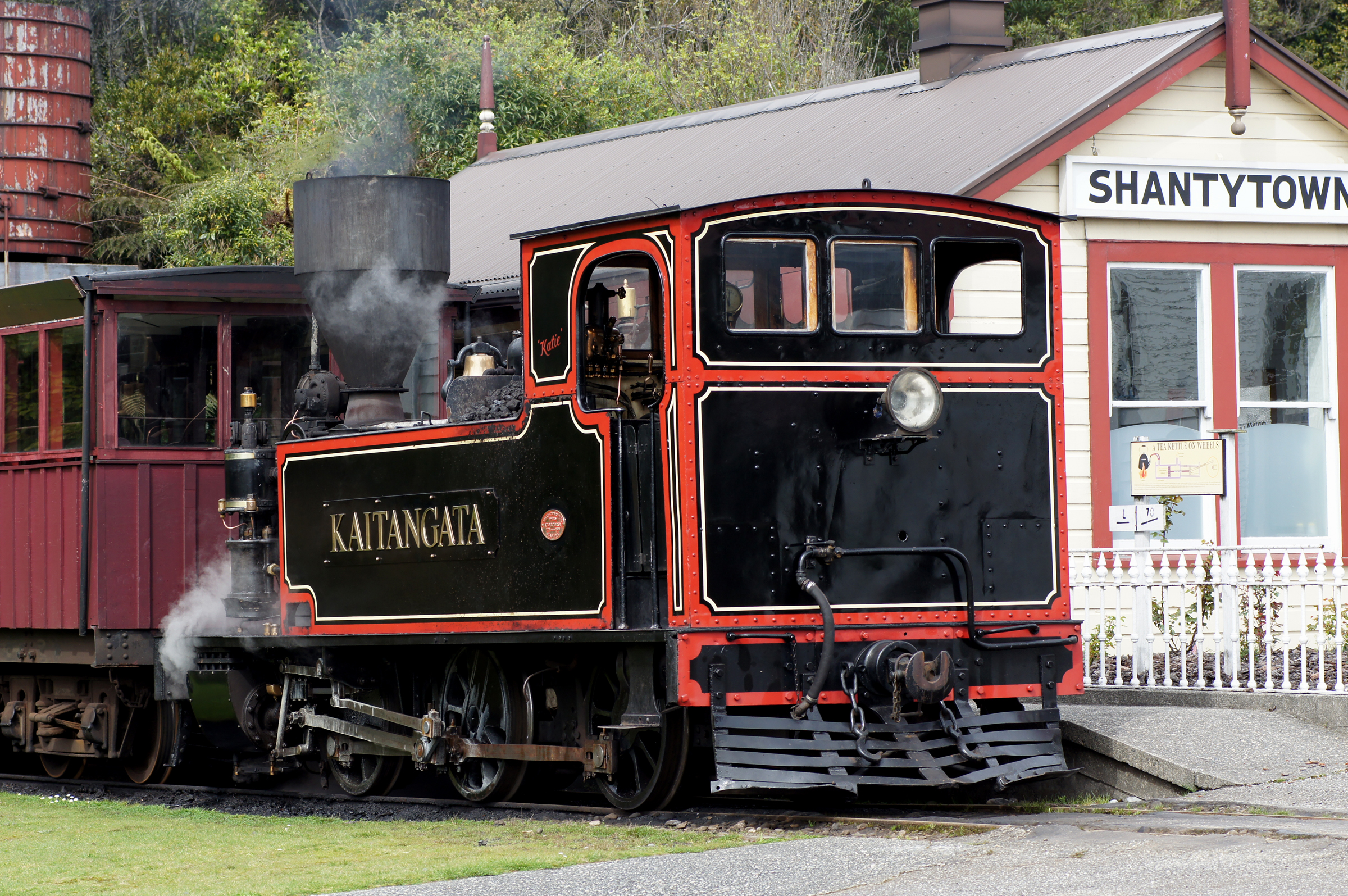
Kaitangata at Shantytown

In 1956, the Mines Department took over the branch and in August 1968 introduced a diesel shunter to work the trains, although the F was retained as a spare. By the end of the 1960s, the condition of the line had deteriorated markedly; accordingly, on 30 December 1970 it was closed by the Mines Department. The F was donated to the preservation society at Shantytown, near Greymouth on the West Coast, where it continues to operate and is named "Kaitangata" after its former home.

The D class engine was retired and scrapped in 1957.
