= Hina (goddess) =

Polynesian goddess

- Goddess associated with the moon, the sea, and other domains
- Other names: Sina; Hanaiakamalama; Ina
- Gender: Female
- Consort: ʻAikanaka; Wākea; Akalana
- Offspring: Māui

Equivalents
- Samoan: Sina
- Rapa Nui: Hina-Oio

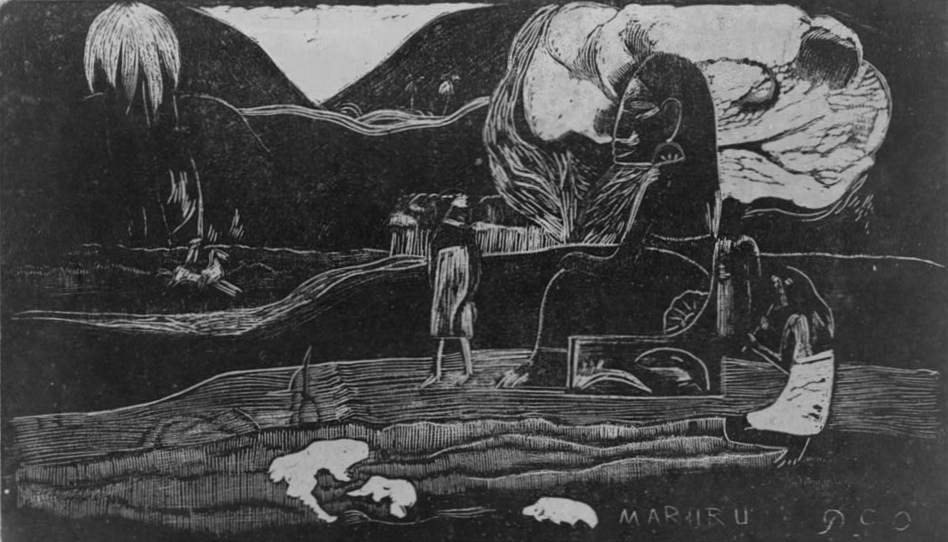
Mararu: Offerings of gratitude to Tahitian goddess Hina. Woodcut by Paul Gauguin (1894).

Hina is the name assigned to a number of Polynesian deities. The name Hina usually relates to a powerful female force (typically a goddess or queen) who has dominion over a specific entity. Some variations of the name Hina include Sina, Hanaiakamalama, and Ina. Even within a single culture, Hina could refer to multiple goddesses and the distinction between the different identities are not always clear. In Hawaiian mythology, the name is usually paired with words which explain or identify the goddess and her power such as Hina-puku-iʻa (Hina-gathering-seafood) the goddess of fishermen, and Hina-ʻopu-hala-koʻa who gave birth to all reef life.

Hina continues to be a figure in many of the Polynesian religions and her stories serve as traditions that unite Polynesia, specifically the Hawaiian Islands.

== New Zealand ==
Among the iwi of New Zealand, Hina is usually considered to be either the elder sister or the wife of Māui.

The most common story that presents Hina as the wife of Māui tells of Te Tunaroa, the father of all eels, who one day visited the pool where Hina bathed. One day, as Hina was bathing, the eel-god rubbed against her. This occurred over a number of visits until Te Tunaroa grew bold enough to rub against Hina's genitals, molesting her.

When Māui heard of this act he went and attacked Te Tunaroa cutting his body into bits, the tail landed in the sea and became the conger eel, whereas the other end landed in the swamps as the fresh water eels. Smaller pieces became lamprey and hagfish.

A number of stories are told about Hina as the elder sister of Māui. Some iwi say that it was Hina who taught Māui to plait the ropes needed to capture the sun, using a strand of her own sacred hair to give the ropes supernatural strength. This legend recognizes important ritual status that elder sisters held in traditional Māori society.

Hina was associated with phases of the moon under the names Hinatea (Fair Hina) and Hinauri (Dark Hina). The moon is also known by the name Māhina. Initially Hinatea (Fair Hina) was married to a man named Irawaru. During a fishing trip Irawaru antagonized Māui who had failed to catch any large fish. In revenge Māui assaulted Irawaru when they returned to shore, pushing his brother-in-law under the keel of their canoe, breaking his back and other bones. Irawaru was turned into a dog (kurī) one breed of which was known as Irawaru.

When Hina heard what Māui had done she threw herself into the sea, but did not die and was instead carried across the waves to Motutapu (Sacred Isle). Her name was changed to Hinauri due to her darker mood. Eventually Hinauri would be welcomed by the people of Motutapu and was taken to the house of Chief Tinirau god of fishes, becoming his new wife. The existing wives were jealous and tried to assault Hinauri, but using her supernatural power Hinauri killed the other wives of Tinirau and so became the senior wife.

Hina was the mother of Tuhuruhuru, for whom the ritual initiation ritual was performed by the tohunga Kae. After this is done, Tinirau lends Kae his pet whale to take him home. In spite of strict instructions to the contrary, Kae forces the whale, Tutunui, into shallow water, where it becomes stranded and is killed, roasted and eaten by Kae and his people. When he learns of this Tinirau is furious and sends Hinauri with a party of women (often they are Tinirau's sisters) to capture Kae. The sisters perform indecent dances to make him laugh so they can see his crooked teeth. Then the women sing a magic song which puts Kae into a deep sleep, and carry him back to Motutapu. When Kae wakes from his sleep he is in Tinirau's house. Tinirau taunts him for his treachery, and kills him (Grey 1970:69, Tregear 1891:110).

== Mangaia ==
A girl named Hina-moe-aitu ("Hina-sleeping-with-a-god") liked to bathe in a pool that housed many eels. One day, as Hina was bathing, one of the eels transformed into a young man. Hina took him as her lover. His name was Tuna.

After they had been together for a while, one day Tuna told Hina that there would be a great downpour the next day. He would be washed up onto the threshold of her house in his eel-form. When that happened, Tuna said, Hina must cut off his head and bury it, and then regularly visit the place where the head had been buried.

Hina obeyed Tuna, returning faithfully to watch the place where she had buried his head. After many days, she saw a shoot sprout from the spot. Another shoot appeared, and the two shoots grew into a pair of coconut trees—the first coconut trees known to man.

In Mangaian tradition, the coconut's white flesh is called "Tuna's brains", and it is said that one can see a face when one looks at the shell of a coconut.

== Tuamotu and Tahiti ==
For a time, the goddess Hina lived as the wife of Te Tuna, the god of eels. But she grew tired of him and decided to seek love elsewhere. Telling Tuna that she was going to get him some delicious food, Hina left him and went onto land.

Hina went from place to place, seeking a lover. But all the men she met were afraid to take Tuna's wife, fearing the eel-god's vengeance. Finally she met Māui, whose mother Taranga urged him to take the goddess as his wife.

When the people round about learned that Māui had taken Hina as his wife, they went to tell Tuna. At first, Tuna didn't care, but the people annoyed him about it so much that he eventually vowed to win back his wife from Māui.

Along with four companions, Tuna rushed toward Māui's home, carried by a huge wave. But Māui's power turned back the wave and left Tuna and his companions beached on the reefs. Māui killed three of Tuna's companions, while one escaped with a broken leg. Tuna himself Māui spared.

Tuna actually lived in peace in Māui's home for some time. But one day, Tuna challenged Māui to a duel. Each would take a turn leaping into the others' body and trying to kill him. If Tuna killed Māui, then Tuna would take his wife back. Tuna's turn came first: he made himself small and entered Māui's body. When he came back out, Māui was intact. Now it was Māui's turn: Māui made himself small and entered Tuna's body, tearing it apart. Māui cut off Tuna's head and, at his mother's suggestion, buried it in a corner of his house.

In time, a shoot sprouted from Tuna's buried head and grew into a coconut tree. That was how humankind acquired coconuts.

== Hawaii ==
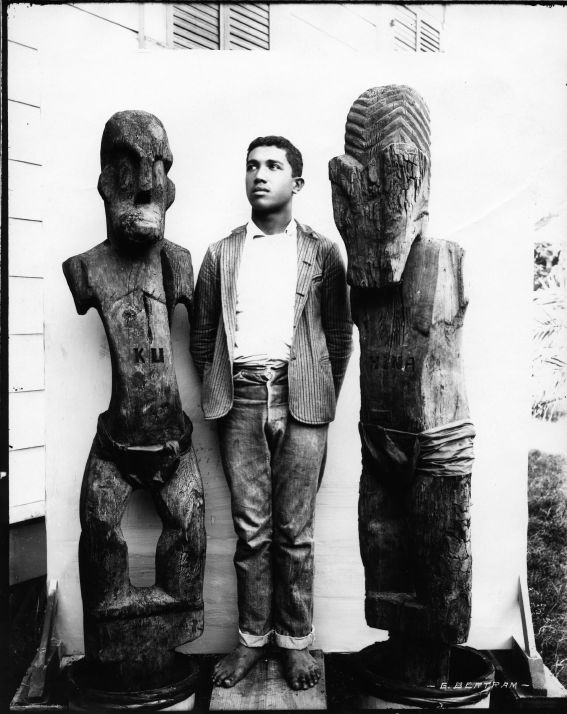
Wooden carved kiʻi of Hina (right) and Kūkaʻilimoku (left)

Even within Hawaiian mythology, Hina could refer to multiple different goddesses. Differentiating between these deities can be ambiguous and is highly debated. However, there are three specific Hawaiian deities named Hina who are widely known and can be distinguished from each other. Hina of Hilo is best known as the mother of Hawaiian hero, Māui. Hina, the wife of Akalana, is known as the goddess of the moon. Mahina, the Hawaiian word for moon, is derived from the goddess' name. Lady Hina-au-kekele was also named after Hina, and the full name of Lady Hineuki was Hinakeʻuki. The consorts of Hina include Chief ʻAikanaka, Sky Father Wākea and/or Akalana with whom she gave birth to several children including Māui.

The worship of Hina marks a long tradition of the Hawaiian people across multiple islands. Archaeologists have discovered remnants of a heiau dedicated to Hina in Kalaupapa National Historical Park, on the Hawaiian Island of Moloka'i. In some of the Hawaiian legends, the goddess lived on Kauiki, a foothill of the dormant volcano Haleakalā on the southeast coast of the Island Maui. Another claim suggests Hina's legends were brought to the Hilo coast with ancient immigrants but the stories are so old that the Hawaiians have forgotten her original lands and see Hilo as her only home.

William Drake Westervelt described the legend:

The place where Kuna dwelt was called Wai-kuna, "the Kuna water". The river in which Hina and Kuna dwelt bears the name Wailuku, "the destructive water" river. Hina called on Maui for aid. Maui came quickly and with mighty blows out out a new channel for the river. Maui went above Kuna 's home and poured hot water into the river. This part of the myth could easily have arisen from a lava outburst on the side of the volcano above the river. The hot water swept in a flood over Kuna's home. Kuna jumped from the boiling pools over a series of small falls near his home into the river below. Here the hot water again scalded him and in pain he leaped from the river to the bank, where Maui killed him by beating him with a club. His body was washed down the river over the falls under which Hina dwelt, into the ocean.

=== Legends of Hina and Māui ===
Many stories about the goddess Hina, especially in connection with the moon, can be found in chapter 15 ("Hina Myths") of Martha Beckwith's Hawaiian Mythology.

The legendary birth of Hina's son, Māui, is described as a supernatural conception after Hina wore a red loincloth she found on the ocean shore. After birth, Hina wrapped locks of her hair around her infant son and set him on a bed of limu kala supported by jellyfish in the sea. Māui then traveled to Kuaihelani where he acquired his famous powers. Legend says when he returned, Māui performed incredible acts such as slowing the sun to make the days longer for Hina's work.

The story of Hina and her ascent to the moon can be found within the stories of many Polynesian groups, including those of Samoa, New Zealand, Tonga, Hervey Islands, Fate Islands, Nauru, and other Pacific Island groups such as the Maluku Islands in Melanesia. There is debate over which Hina the story refers to but certain stories suggest this legend is about Hina the wife of a chief called Aikanaka rather than to Hina the wife of Akalana, the father of Māui.

== Samoa ==
In Samoa, the equivalent the name Sina referred to in many different stories in mythology. One example is the legend Sina and the Eel which is associated with the Mata o le Alelo pool on the island of Savai'i.

== Easter Island (Rapa Nui) ==
In Rapa Nui mythology, Hina takes the form of Hina-Oio, a goddess of sea animals who was married to Atua-Metua.

== Hina in literature ==
Richard Adams wrote a poem retelling the Tahitian story of Hina and Māui, published as a book, The Legend of Te Tuna.

Also, in his popular book The Seven Daughters of Eve, Bryan Sykes used Hina's name, (spelled therein "Ina") to denote the clan matriarch of mtDNA haplogroup B.

== Hina in popular music ==
David Lee Roth recorded a song called "Hina", contained on the 1988 hard rock album Skyscraper.

Technical death metal band Gorod included a song called "Hina" on their 2018 album Æthra.

== See also ==
- Dema deity
- List of lunar deities

== General and cited references ==
- Adams, Richard. The Legend of Te Tuna. London: Sidgwick & Jackson, 1986.
- Alpers, Anthony. Legends of the South Sea. London: John Murray, 1970.
- Martha Warren Beckwith. Hawaiian Mythology. New Haven: Yale UP, 1940.
- Campbell, Joseph. The Masks of God: Primitive Mythology. New York: Viking, 1970.
- Luquet, G. H. "Oceanic Mythology". New Larousse Encyclopedia of Mythology (ed. Felix Guirand, trans. Richard Aldington and Delano Ames, London: Hamlyn, 1968), pp. 449–72.
- Reed, A. W. Myths and Legends of Maoriland. Wellington: A.H. & A.W. Reed, 1961.
- Sykes, B. The Seven Daughters of Eve New York, London: W. W. Norton, 2001.
- Wilkinson, Philip. Illustrated Dictionary of Mythology. New York: DK, 1998.
