= Kaitangata (mythology) =

- Gender: Male
- Region: New Zealand
- Ethnic group: Māori
- Parents: Māui or Rehua
- Consort: Whaitiri
- Offspring: Hemā

In Māori mythology, Kaitangata is either a mortal son of Māui, or a son of star-god Rehua.

Kaitangata, the son of Māui, is an industrious man who married the female supernatural being Whaitiri. Due to his name, Kaitangata means man-eater, Whaitiri believed him to be a cannibal as she was. However this proved to be incorrect and she eventually left him because he offended her. Before she returned to heaven as a cloud, she taught Kaitangata how to fish. With Whaitiri, he was the father of Hemā; according to Leslie G. Kelly in a 1940 issue of The Journal of the Polynesian Society, early Christian missionaries Kaitangata and Hemā's familial relationship as stand-ins to teach Biblical relationships to the Māori.
