= Tāwhaki =

Mythical being in Māori mythology

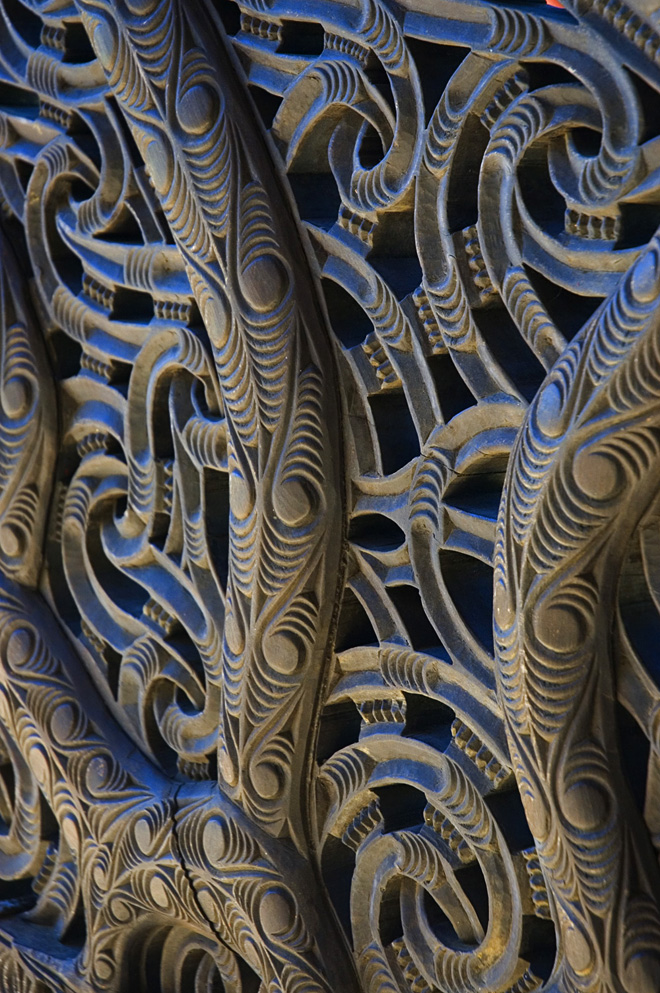
Carving from a Māori waka.

In Māori mythology, Tāwhaki is a semi-supernatural being associated with lightning and thunder.

== Genealogy ==
The genealogy of Tāwhaki varies somewhat in different accounts. In general, Tāwhaki is a grandson of Whaitiri, a cannibalistic goddess who marries the mortal Kaitangata (man-eater), thinking that he shares her taste for human flesh. Disappointed at finding that this is not so, she leaves him after their sons Hemā and Punga are born and returns to heaven. Hemā is the father of Tāwhaki and Karihi.

Tāwhaki grows up to be handsome, becoming the envy of his cousins, who beat him up and leave him for dead. He is nursed back to health by his wife, who feeds the fire that warms him with a whole log of wood. In memory of this incident, their child is named Wahieroa (Long-piece-of-firewood). In some versions of this myth, Tawhaki is the father of Arahuta. Arahuta was said to be the cause of a quarrel between her parents, after which her mother Tangotango took her to the heavens, where they were afterwards joined by Tāwhaki.

== Encounter with the Ponaturi ==
Hemā, while looking for a gift for his son, trespasses into the land of the Ponaturi, who are evil beings said to live beneath the sea. They capture him and Urutonga, blinding Hemā in the process. While journeying to rescue his parents, Tāwhaki meets and marries Hinepiripiri, to whom is born their son, Wahieroa. Tāwhaki and his brother Karihi rescue their enslaved mother, who tell them that light is fatal to the Ponaturi.

Eventually, with the help of their mother, they attempt to trick the Ponaturi, who have returned to their house to sleep. Tāwhaki and his brother hide, after having blocked up all the gaps in the house so that no light can enter. When the Ponaturi begin to believe that the night had been set for very long, Urutonga reassures them that there was still a long time before dawn would break. They then set fire to the house, and proceeded to open the door. The Ponaturi are killed by the fire and the exposure to the sunlight. The only survivors are Tonga-Hiti and Kanae.

== Climbs into the heavens ==
Tāwhaki and his young brother set off to climb up to the sky. At the foot of the ascent they find their grandmother, Whaitiri, now blind, who sits endlessly counting the tubers of sweet potato or taro that are said to be her only food. Whaitiri had been the guardian of the vines that formed the pathway into the sky. The brothers tease her by snatching them away, one by one, and upsetting her count. Eventually, they reveal themselves to her and restore her sight. In return, she gives them advice about how best to make the climb into the sky.

Karihi tries first, but makes the error of climbing up the aka taepa, or hanging vine. He is blown violently around by the winds and falls to his death. Tāwhaki climbs by the aka matua, or parent vine, recites the right incantations, and reaches the highest of the ten heavens. There he learns many spells from Tama-i-waho, and marries a woman named Hāpai, or as others say, Tangotango or Maikuku-makaka. They have a son, and according to some versions of the story, it is this child who is named Wahieroa.

== Tribal versions ==
The story of Tāwhaki varies between iwis. To illustrate the difference, two different versions based upon the Arawa and Ngati versions are presented below.

=== Arawa version ===
In an 1850 version of Tāwhaki by Hohepa Paraone of the Arawa tribe of Rotorua (Paraone 1850:345-352, White 1887:115-119 (English), 100-105 (Māori), Tāwhaki is a mortal man who is visited each night by Hāpai, a woman from the heavens. When Hāpai becomes pregnant, she tells Tāwhaki that if their child is female, he is to wash her. After their daughter Puanga is born, Tāwhaki washes her, but expresses disgust at the smell. Offended, Hāpai takes the child, climbs onto the roof of the house, and disappears into the sky.

After a few months, Tāwhaki decides to go and find Hāpai and Puanga. He sets off with his two slaves. He warns the slaves not to look at the fortress of Tongameha as they pass by. One of the slaves looks, and Tongameha gouges out his eyes. Tāwhaki and the remaining slave go on, and meet Matakerepō, a blind old woman, guarding the vines (or ropes) that lead up into the heavens. Matakerepō is an ancestress of Tāwhaki's. As Matakerepō counts out her ten taro tubers, Tāwhaki removes them one by one.

Matakerepō, aware that someone is deceiving her, begins to sniff the air, and her stomach distends, ready to swallow the stranger. She sniffs towards the south, and towards all the winds. When she sniffs towards the west she catches Tāwhaki's scent and calls out 'Are you come with the wind that blows on my skin?' Tāwhaki grunts, and Matakerepō says, 'Oh, it is my grandson Tāwhaki.' Her stomach begins to shrink. Had he not been from the west wind, she would have swallowed him.

Matakerepō asks Tāwhaki where he is going. He replies that he is searching for his wife and daughter; his wife is a daughter of Whatitiri-matakamataka (or Whaitiri) and has returned to the heavens. Matakerepō shows him the pathway, advising him to set off in the morning. Tāwhaki's slave prepares a meal. Tāwhaki takes some cooked food and rubs it on the eyes of the old woman. Matakerepō is instantly cured of her blindness. In the morning, Tāwhaki presents his slave to Matakerepō, who chants a spell to help him as climbs. When he reaches the heavens, Tāwhaki disguises himself as an old slave and assists his brothers-in-law to build a canoe. Each night, the brothers-in-law return to their village, where Tāwhaki's wife and daughter are living. Pretending to be unable to keep up, Tāwhaki lets the brothers-in-law go on ahead, and returns to work on the canoe, arriving at the village much later. The next morning, Tāwhaki and the brothers-in-law return; seeing the canoe, the brothers-in-law are surprised by all the work that has been done. Each evening, Tāwhaki sits in the special seat of Hāpai, despite the protests of the villagers. These deeds of Tāwhaki bring him to Hāpai's attention, and she asks him who he is. Tāwhaki resumes his true appearance and is recognised by his wife. He performs rituals of dedication over their daughter.

=== Ngāti Porou version ===
In a legend committed to manuscript by Mohi Ruatapu of Ngāti Porou in 1971 (Reedy 1993:25-33, 126–134), Tāwhaki is a descendant of Māui. Whaitiri, a granddaughter of Māui, marries Kaitangata and has Hemā. Hemā marries Rawhita-i-te-rangi, and has Tāwhaki and his younger brother Karihi. Tāwhaki and Karihi set off to find their grandmother Whaitiri. They come to a village where a kawa (open ceremony) is being performed for Hine-te-kawa's house. They hide in the walls of the house and listen to the incantations. As the ceremony ends, Tāwhaki and Karihi leap out and kill all the people except Hine-te-kawa, who sleeps with Tāwhaki that night. She shows them the pathway they must take into the sky; it has pegs as footholds. Karihi makes several attempts at the climb, but falls to his death on the second attempt. Tāwhaki takes Karihi's eyes and makes the climb. He comes upon Whaitiri, his blind grandmother, counting out twelve taro for her grandchildren, who are away at the village of Tama-i-waho. Tāwhaki removes the taro tubers one by one, until Whaitiri realises that it must be her grandson who she had foretold would come to find her. Tāwhaki places Karihi's eyes into her eyes, and her sight is restored. Tāwhaki busies himself tidying his grandmother's village, and washes and cares for her. Tāwhaki catches marries Maikuku, one of Whaitiri's granddaughters; the other granddaughters escape to Tama-i-waho's village, up in the second sky. When they look down and see Tāwhaki and Maikuku making love outdoors, they are offended and come down and take Maikuku away into the sky. Tāwhaki, desperate to find his wife, who is pregnant, tries to ascend on a kite, but the evil Tama-i-waho sends a hākuai, a mythical bird, to attack the kite, causing Tāwhaki to fall. Tāwhaki then turns himself into a harrier hawk, and takes off. Using his adze Te Rakuraku-o-te-rangi, Tama-i-waho cuts off one of the wings of the hawk, and Tāwhaki falls to his death. After Tāwhaki's death, Maikuku bears him a son, named Wahiroa.

== Flood myth ==
Some versions of the story of Tāwhaki contain episodes where he causes a flood to destroy the village of his two jealous brothers-in-law. He directs his own people to relocate their village to the top of the mountain Hikurangi. A comment in Grey's Polynesian Mythology may have given the Māori something they did not have before — as A.W Reed put it, "In Polynesian Mythology Grey said that when Tāwhaki's ancestors released the floods of heaven, the earth was overwhelmed and all human beings perished — thus providing the Māori with his own version of the universal flood" (Reed 1963:165, in a footnote). Christian influence has led to the appearance of genealogies where Tawhaki's grandfather Hema is reinterpreted as Shem, son of Noah of the biblical deluge.

In Tahiti the legend runs as follows: Tahiti was destroyed by the sea : no man, nor hog, nor fowl, nor dog survived. The groves of trees and the stones were carried away by the wind They were destroyed, and the deep was over the land. But two persons, a husband and a wife, were saved When the flood came, the wife took up her young chicken, her young dog, and her kitten; the husband took up his young pig (These were all the animals formerly known to the natives; and as the term fanaua, 'young,' is both singular and plural, it may apply to one or more than one chicken, etc.). The husband proposed that they take refuge on Mount Orofena, a high mountain in Tahiti, saying that it was lofty and would not be reached by the sea. His wife had objected that the sea would reach to Mount Orofena, and that they had better go to Mount O Pitohito, where they would be safe from the flood So to Mount O Pitohito they went; and she was right, for Orofena was overwhelmed by the sea, but O Pitohito rose above the waste of waters and became their abode. There they watched ten nights, till the sea ebbed, and they saw the little heads of the mountains appearing above the waves.

When the sea had retired, the land remained without produce, without man, and the fish were putrid in the caves and holes of the rocks. They said, "Dig a hole for the fish in the sea." The wind also swept away, and when all was calm, the stones and the trees had begun to fall from the heavens, to which they had been carried up by the wind. For all the trees of the land had been torn up and whirled aloft by the hurricane. The two looked about, and the woman said, "We two are safe from the sea, but death, or hurt, comes now in these stones that are falling. Where shall we abide?" So the two dug a hole, lined it with grass, and covered it over with stones and earth. Then they crept into the hole, and sitting there they heard with terror the roar and crash of the stones falling down from the sky. By and by, the rain of stones abated, till only a few stones fell at intervals, and then they dropped one by one, and finally ceased altogether. The woman said, "Arise, go out, and see whether the stones are still falling." But her husband said, "Nay, I go not out, lest I die.”

== See also ==
- Kaha'i for information on cognate deities in other Polynesian cultures
