= Tokyo Dental College =

Private university in Chiyoda-ku, Tokyo, Japan

Coordinates: 35°41′06.95″N 139°54′46.24″E

- 東京歯科大学; Tōkyō Shika Daigaku
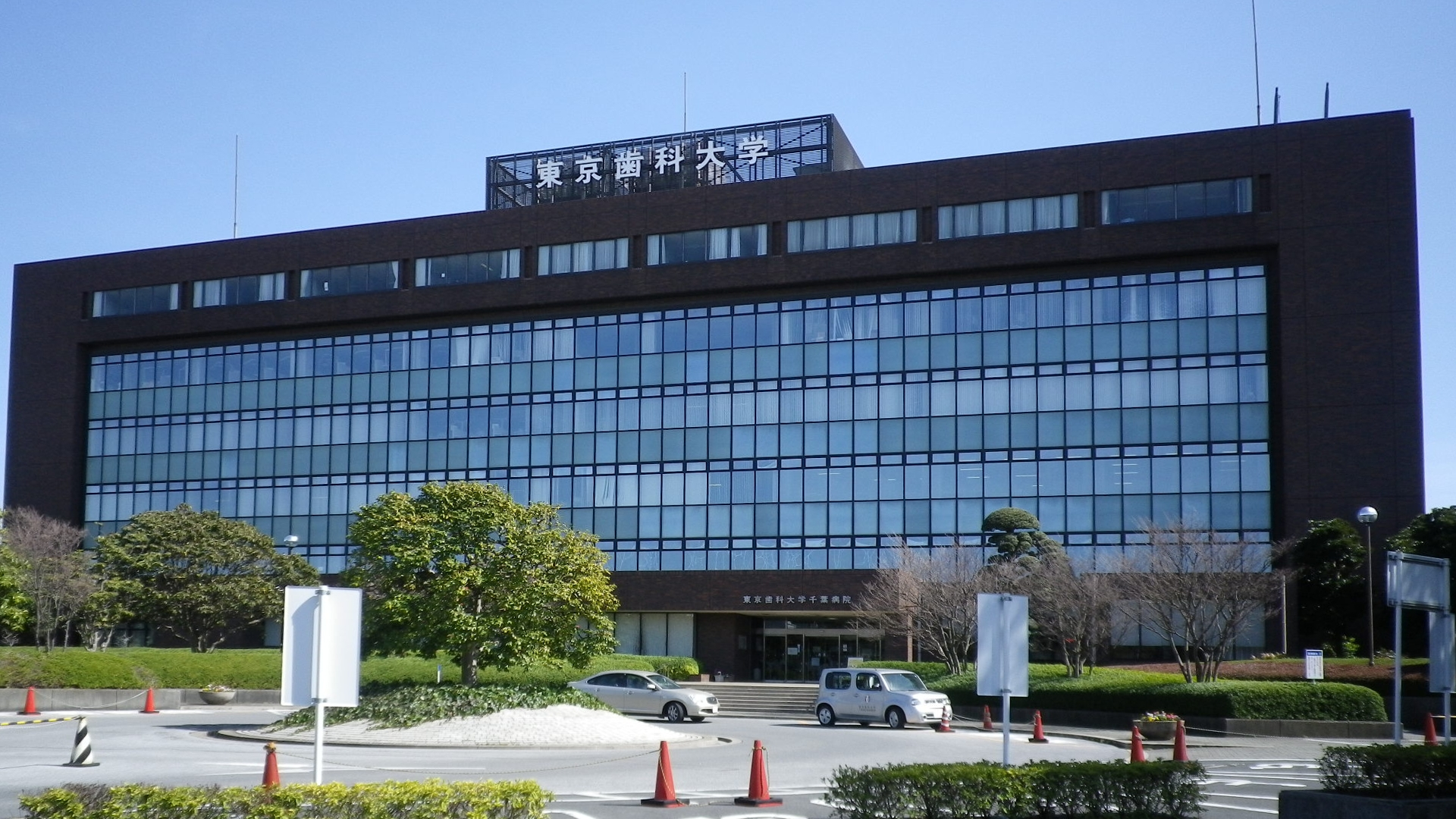
- Type: Private
- Established: 1890
- Location: Chiyoda, Tokyo, Japan
- Website: Official website

Tokyo Dental College (東京歯科大学, Tōkyō Shika Daigaku) is a private university in the city of Chiyoda-ku, Tokyo, Japan.

== History ==
The predecessor of the school was founded in 1890, and it was chartered as a university in 1946.

Among its former leaders was oral pathologist Seiichi Matsumiya, who served as president of Tokyo Dental College from 1977 to 1983.

It is the only institution in all of Japan specializing exclusively in the teaching of dentistry.

== Courses ==
The College's program spans over six years in which students study ten months per year.

Freshmen students' courses include: Chemistry and Physics, Anatomy and Histology (General and Dental) and Physiology.

Junior students focus on Pathology (General and Dental), Bacteriology, Metallurgy, Prosthetic Dentistry and other things.

Seniors study, Oral Surgery, Orthodontia, Operative Dentistry, Crown and bridge-work, Laboratory work and Infirmary practice.
