= Polynesian mythology =

Indigenous religion

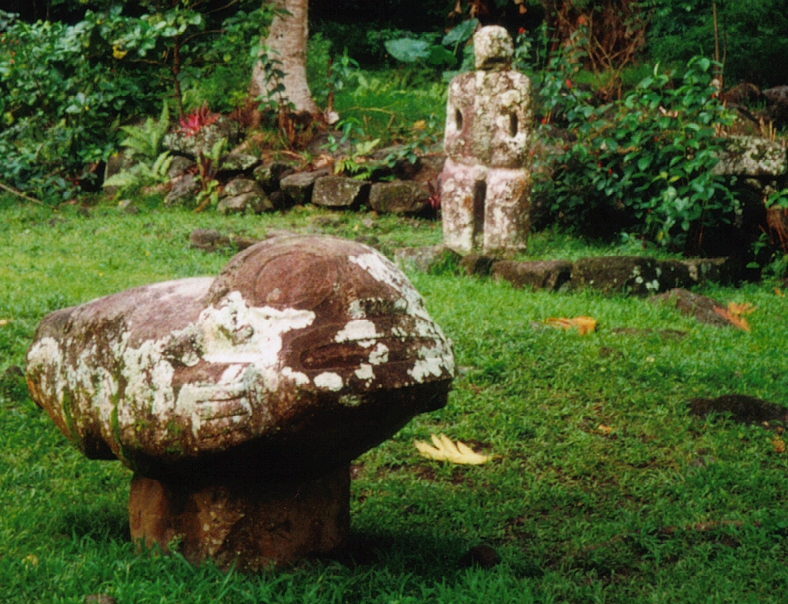
Tiki Makiʻi Tauʻa Pepe (foreground) and Tiki Manuiotaa (background) from the meʻae Iʻipona on Hiva Oa in the Marquesas Islands

Polynesian mythology encompasses the oral traditions of the people of Polynesia (a grouping of Central and South Pacific Ocean island archipelagos in the Polynesian Triangle) together with those of the scattered cultures known as the Polynesian outliers. Polynesians speak languages that descend from a language reconstructed as Proto-Polynesian – probably spoken in the Tonga and Samoa area around 1000 BC.

== Descriptions ==
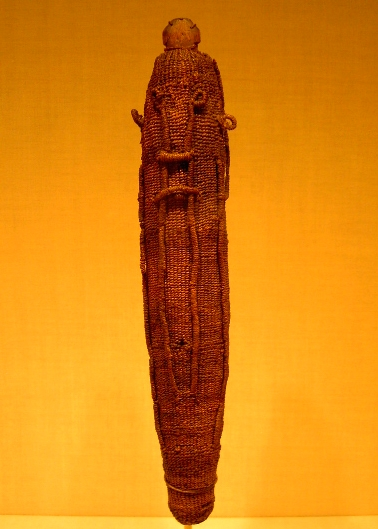
A sacred god figure wrapping for the war god 'Oro, made of woven dried coconut fibre (sennit), which would have protected a Polynesian god effigy (to'o) made of wood

After this the legend of Maui was spreading prior to the 15th century AD, Polynesian peoples fanned out to the east, to the Cook Islands, and from there to other groups such as Tahiti and the Marquesas. Their descendants later discovered the islands from Tahiti to Rapa Nui, and later Hawai‘i and New Zealand. The latest research puts the settlement of New Zealand at about 1300 AD. The various Polynesian languages are all part of the Austronesian language family. Many are close enough in terms of vocabulary and grammar to permit communication between speakers of different languages. There are also substantial cultural similarities between the various groups, especially in terms of social organization, childrearing, horticulture, building and textile technologies; their mythologies, in particular, demonstrate local reworkings of commonly shared tales.

In some island groups, Tangaroa is of great importance as the god of the sea and of fishing. There is often a story of the marriage between Sky and Earth; the New Zealand version, Rangi and Papa, is a union that gives birth to the world and all things in it. There are stories of islands pulled up from the bottom of the sea by a magic fishhook or thrown down from heaven. There are stories of voyages, migrations, seductions and battles. Stories about a trickster, Māui and demon Ulupoka are widely known, as are those about a beautiful goddess/ancestress Hina or Sina.

In addition to these shared themes in the oral tradition, each island group has its own stories of demi-gods and culture heroes, shading gradually into the firmer outlines of remembered history. Often such stories were linked to various geographic or ecological features, which may be described as the petrified remains of supernatural beings.

== From verbal to written ==
The various Polynesian cultures each have distinct but related oral traditions, that is, legends or myths traditionally considered to recount the history of ancient times (the time of "pō") and the adventures of gods ("atua") and deified ancestors. The accounts are characterised by extensive use of allegory, metaphor, parable, hyperbole, and personification. Orality has an essential flexibility that writing does not allow. In an oral tradition, there is no fixed version of a given tale. The story may change within certain limits according to the setting, and the needs of the narrator and the audience. Contrary to the modern scholarly concept of history, where the knowledge of the past serves to bring a better understanding of the present, the purpose of oral literature is rather to justify and legitimatise the present situation.

An example is provided by genealogies, which exist in multiple and often contradictory versions. The purpose of genealogies in oral societies generally is not to provide a 'true' account, but rather to emphasise the seniority of the ruling chiefly line, and hence its political legitimacy and right to exploit resources of land and the like. If another line should rise to ascendency, it was necessary to bestow upon the new line the most prestigious genealogy, even if this meant borrowing a few ancestors from the preceding dynasty. Each island, each tribe or each clan will have their own version or interpretation of a given narrative cycle.

This process is disrupted when writing becomes the primary means to record and remember the traditions. When missionaries, officials, anthropologists or ethnologists collected and published these accounts, they inevitably changed their nature. By fixing forever on paper what had previously been subject to almost infinite variation, they fixed as the authoritative version an account told by one narrator at a given moment. In New Zealand, the writings of one chief, Wiremu Te Rangikāheke, formed the basis of much of Governor George Grey's Polynesian Mythology, a book which to this day provides the de facto official versions of many of the best-known Māori legends.

Some Polynesians seem to have been aware of the danger and the potential of this new means of expression. As of the mid-19th century, a number of them wrote down their genealogy, the history and the origin of their tribe. These writings, known under the name of "pukapuka whakapapa" (genealogy books, Māori) or in tropical Polynesia as "puta tumu" (origin stories) or "puta tūpuna" (ancestral stories) were jealously guarded by the heads of households. Many disappeared or were destroyed. In the 1890s, Makea Takau, a Rarotongan chief, ordered his tribe to burn all their family books, save his own. As a result, Makea Takau's version became the official history of the chiefly line, removing the possibility of dissent. At his request, extracts were published in the Journal of the Polynesian Society.

== See also ==
- Austronesian peoples
- Ghosts in Polynesian culture
- Hawaiian religion
- Kohara, goddess of tuna
- Malagasy mythology
- Māori mythology
- Motoro
- ʻOro
- Rapa Nui mythology (Easter Island)
- Samoan mythology
- Separation of heaven and earth
- Sina and the Eel
- Tahiti and Society Islands mythology
- Tongan narrative
- Tuna
- Tuvaluan mythology
- Ulupoka
