= Polynesian Mythology (book) =

1855 collection of Māori mythology

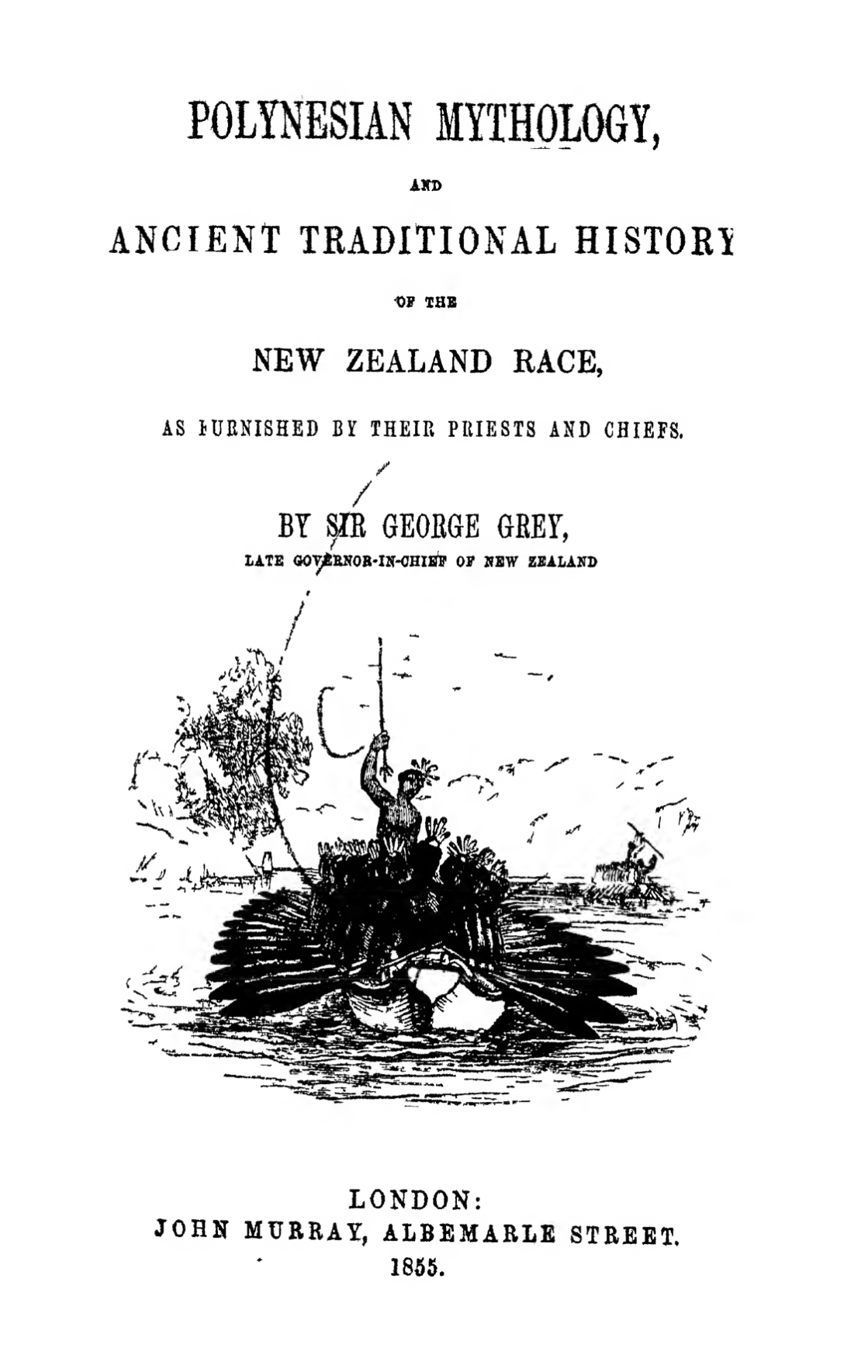
Title page of Polynesian Mythology (1855)

Polynesian Mythology and Ancient Traditional History of the New Zealand Race as Furnished by Their Priests and Chiefs is an 1855 collection of Māori mythology compiled and translated by Sir George Grey, then Governor-General of New Zealand, with significant assistance from Te Rangikāheke. The English edition is a translation of Ko ngā mahinga a ngā tūpuna Māori (The Deeds of the Ancestors), published in 1854, which was an expanded version of a manuscript entitled Ko ngā mōteatea, me ngā hakirara o ngā Māori (The Traditional Chants and Songs of the Māori) originally published in New Zealand in 1853.

== Compilation from primary sources ==
In a preface to the book, George Grey writes that he felt he was unable to effectively communicate with Māori leaders and petitioners without speaking Te Reo Māori and understanding the references and allusions made in writings. Grey writes that he felt that translators were not able to adequately explain the context of allusions in written communications and that the additional delays to speaking meant that conversation was inevitably condensed in a way that made it harder to connect with people.

By 1849, a Māori tribal leader named Te Rangikāheke was working closely with him and teaching him Te Reo Māori. Te Rangikāheke compiled manuscripts about most aspects of Māori culture, including about myths and tribal history; these formed the basis for at least a quarter of Polynesian Mythology, though Grey introduced "alterations, combinations and omissions" and "did not acknowledge his debt."

Some stories, such as the legend of Hatupatu, are considered to be the sole work of Te Rangikāheke; the legend of Hinemoa consists of Te Rangikāheke's work interwoven with portions of the version of that story that Grey obtained directly from the inhabitants of Mokoia Island. Additional manuscript pages, including the legend of Kae and part of the Māui story, came from Hēnare Mātene Te Whiwhi. Parts of the manuscript can be attributed to a wealth of other contributors, including tribal leaders and some missionaries.

The way in which Grey compiled different versions of myths from different sources created a "patchwork which does not truly represent the traditions of any particular region." Nonetheless, the versions compiled can be considered reliable as "a wide range of tribal areas is represented" and "other things being equal, an informant who was born into the pre-contact culture, may be regarded as more reliable than one who knew the unaltered culture only by hearsay. Grey's informants or recorders were often people who had experienced life in a period relatively unaffected by European contact or who had access, in the persons of their fathers, or relatives of the father's generation, to informants who had lived in the pre-European situation."

== Publication history ==
About the time that Te Rangikāheke joined Grey's household in 1848, Grey's collection of manuscripts was destroyed by a fire; this was one factor that made him decide to put his Māori texts into print. Robert Stokes, then the proprietor of the New Zealand Spectator and a political ally of Grey, was involved in the initial typesetting of manuscript pages in early 1851. By September 1853, printing was complete of a 432-page Māori-language manuscript bearing the name Ko nga moteatea, me nga hakirara o nga Maori (a copy exists in the Auckland Public Library that includes a 96-page supplement, 18-page index, 2 pages of errata, and a preface), and Grey gave several copies to close associates before sailing to England at the end of 1853. In London, he had an expanded version of the Māori-language manuscript, including additional legends from Te Rangikāheke's manuscripts, printed and bound by Remnant and Edmonds under the name Ko Nga Mahinga a Nga Tupuna Maori.

While Grey's earlier publications had been smaller, the English translation of Polynesian Mythology was a considerably larger publication and a commercial venture. Publisher John Murray was a well established firm and footed the production costs in exchange for half the profit. The book was aimed at a Victorian audience, with illustrations included and source material excised for reasons of length, repetitive theme, and so as not to offend that audience; modern scholarship of the legend of Hinemoa and Tutānekai look at the relationship between Tutānekai and his Takatāpui Tiki in a queer light.

== Summary of myths ==
=== The Children of Heaven and Earth ===
Originally, there was Rangi and Papa, the heavens and the earth, and they were tightly pressed together with their children in between them without light or space. Tūmatauenga, the god of war, suggested killing Rangi and Papa so that he and his brothers might have space, but Tānemahuta, the god of forests and birds and insects, suggested that instead they should separate the heavens from the earth. All of the brothers agreed to this except for Tāwhirimātea, the god of winds and storms, but the brothers were not able to do so until finally Tānemahuta placed his head in the earth and his feet against the sky and stood up.

In revenge for these actions, Tāwhirimātea waged war against his brothers. Tangaroa, the god of the ocean, fled to the sea, but his children Tūtewehiwehi, the father of reptiles, and Ikatere, the father of fish, disagreed about where to go, and so the fish ended up in the sea and the reptiles ended up on land. Rongomātāne, the god of cultivated plants, and Haumia-tikitiki, the god of uncultivated food, took refuge hidden within Papa, so Tāwhirimātea could not find them. Finally, Tāwhirimātea fought against Tūmatauenga, but Tūmatauenga stood firm and resisted his brother. Tūmatauenga then turned against his brothers because they had not helped him, so he sought out the food from all of his brothers' domains. His children increased and were mankind.

=== The Legend of Māui ===
Māui, the son of Taranga, was born prematurely and thrown into the sea wrapped in a tress of his mother's topknot; he is found by his ancestor Tama-nui-ki-te-Rangi, who nurses him to health. After introducing himself to his mother and brothers and living with them, he came to wonder where Taranga went to during the day. After investigating, he found that she disappeared into a cave, and so in the form of a pigeon, he flew down into the cave until he found his mother lying with her husband. His father Makeatutara took him into the water to be baptized, but Makeatutara in his haste skipped over a portion of the blessings, which he knew would mean that the gods would be sure to punish by causing Māui to die.

Māui takes food to his ancestor Muri-ranga-whenua, who recognises him as her descendant and gives him her jawbone by which he might work great enchantments. The first of these was to take his brothers and ensnare the sun so that it might move more slowly and give longer days. The next of these was to haul up a great fish from the depths of the sea with his enchanted fish-hook which became the North Island; although he told his brothers not to cut into it until he had appeased the gods, they did, so the fish thrashed around and created the mountainous geography.

Wanting to know where fire came from, Māui put out all the fires in the village so he would be sent to Mahuika to collect more. After extinguishing all bar one of her flaming fingernails, Mahuika grew angry at Māui and sent fire after him to destroy him, but Māui called out to Tāwhirimātea and Whaitiri-mātakataka, who sent rains to save him. Later, Māui quarrels with his brother-in-law Irawaru and turns him into the first dog. Distraught with grief, his sister Hinauri throws herself into the sea.

Māui returned to the land of his father, where he is told that because he was baptised incorrectly, he will die. Māui set out to defeat Hinenuitepō, the goddess of the night and of death, by climbing up through her womb and out through her mouth. Māui brought with him some birds as companions and instructed them not to laugh until he was almost out of her mouth, but the water wagtail could not help but laugh, and so Hinenuitepō woke up, closed her legs together, and killed Māui. As a result, humans are mortal.

=== The Legend of Tāwhaki ===
Tāwhaki on the way back from fishing with the brothers of his wife, Hinepiripiri, when they attack him and leave him for dead. Hinepiripiri finds him and saves him, and Tāwhaki departs with his family and warriors to build a fortified village atop a mountain. First, Tāwhaki gets revenge on those who attacked him by calling down floods of waters from the heavens. Next, Tāwhaki seeks revenge on the Ponaturi who had killed his father and imprisoned his mother, Urutonga. The Ponaturi live under the sea during the day and on the land at night, so Urutonga has Tāwhaki and his brother Karihi block up the windows to their house so that the Ponaturi will be tricked into staying above the sea after dawn, at which point the sun's rays can destroy them.

Having heard of his deeds and his beauty, Tangotango comes down from the heavens to see Tāwhaki and sleep with him; Tangotango bears him a daughter, but is offended by Tāwhaki and so returns to the heavens. Tāwhaki and Karihi set off for the heavens to find them again and find Matakerepō, their blind ancestor, counting taro roots. At first they trick her by taking the roots when she is not looking, but then Tāwhaki restores her sight to her, and she gives the brothers information about how they can ascend to the heavens by climbing hanging vines. Karihi tries first, but grabs a loose vine and very nearly dies, but Tāwhaki is able to climb a strong vine and reach the heavens. Once there, he disguises himself as an old slave and performs wonders until he reveals himself to his wife and daughter.

=== The Legend of Rupe ===
Hinauri, having thrown herself into the sea after Māui turned her husband into a dog, washes ashore at Wairarawa and is found by two brothers. Māuimua, also called Rupe, was unable to find her, so he journeyed to the tenth heaven and consulted with his ancestor Rehua, who directed him to Motutapu island, where Hinauri had been taken as wife to the superior chief Tinirau. Rupe arrives in the form of a pigeon just as Hinauri is about to give birth, and he takes her and her baby up to the heavens with him, but as they fly the placenta is accidentally dropped and eaten by a shark. Rupe and Hinauri live with Rehua in the heavens.

=== The Legend of Kae’s Theft of the Whale ===
Tinirau brings the magician Kae to his village to perform enchantments for his newborn son Tūhuruhuru. Kae arranges to be taken home on Tinirau's pet whale Tutunui, and once he reaches his village, he kills Tutunui. Afterwards, he and his village butcher and eat the whale. Tinirau and his wife smell the cooking whale over the sea and know what has happened, and while they want revenge, they know that a group of warriors arriving at Kae's village will be seen as a threat. Instead, a canoe of forty women go to Kae's village so as not to arouse suspicion. They have been told that they will recognise Kae by his overlapping teeth, so when they arrive they perform tricks to get everybody to laugh. Once they have found Kae, they perform enchantments to make everybody in Kae's village to sleep, and then they take Kae back to Tinirau, where he is slain.

=== The Legend of Tūwhakararo ===
Tūhuruhuru has many children, including Tūwhakararo and Mairatea. After her marriage, Tūwhakararo goes to visit Mairatea at the Āti Hāpai; a young woman there takes a liking to him, which angers the man she has been courting, and so Tūwhakararo is killed and eaten. Whakataupōtiki hears of this and takes warriors to get revenge, which he is able to do by disguising himself with charcoal and cutting his hair.

=== The Legend of Rātā ===
Rātā, the grandson of Tāwhaki, sets out to avenge the death of his father Wahieroa who was slain shortly after Rātā's birth. Rātā finds a man who tells him of Matuku-takotako, who killed his father and who rises from the earth every new moon. Rātā waits for the new moon and is able to kill Matuku as he washes his hair but is told that he will need to seek elsewhere to find Wahieroa's bones.

Rātā at first struggles to carve a canoe as spirits repair and regrow the tree he has felled to do so, but eventually the spirits help him and he takes 140 warriors with him to seek out the Ponaturi who have been using Wahieroa's bones to beat out incantations. Rātā learns the incantation and then slays the Ponaturi present and takes Wahieroa's bones. A thousand Ponaturi follow Rātā and his warriors back to their home and engage in a battle; at first 60 of the warriors are slain, but Rātā chants the incantation he learned and the warriors are returned to life.

Rātā takes Tongarautawhiri as a wife and their son is Tūwhakararo. Tūwhakararo takes Apakura as a wife, and their child is Whakatau, who is born when the god Rongotakawiu shapes Apakura's discarded apron into life. Whakatau is born in the sea, but eventually Apakura catches him flying a kite on the seashore, and Whakatau comes to live on land.

In an alternative, different version of the legend of the death of Tūwhakararo, Whakatau is approached for help by Hine-i-te-iwaiwa. He takes six warriors and goes to avenge Tūwhakararo, which he does by first goading the best warriors of the enemy to attack him and kills them one by one and then by sneaking into the house and collapsing it upon everybody.

=== The Legend of Toitehuatahi and Tamatekapua ===
Uenuku witnesses a dog owned by Houmaitawhiti and his sons Tamatekapua and Whakatūria eating a discarded bandage of his; in retaliation, Uenuku eats the dog. When Tamatekapua and Whakatūria come looking for the dog, they hear it barking from within Uenuku, so they steal pōporo fruit from his village as retaliation. When the villagers discover that their pōporo trees no longer have fruit on them, they lie in wait to find the people stealing from them; Tamatekapua manages to escape, but Whakatūria is caught and hung up in the longhouse to slowly die from the smoke. Tamatekapua visits his brother and at his suggestion, Whakatūria is able to escape by insulting the dancing of his captors and asking to demonstrate better dances. The war continues and Houmaitawhiti and Whakatūria are killed, but Tamatekapua survives.

=== The Legend of Poutini and Whaiapu ===
Ngāhoe is driven from Hawaiki by Hine-tū-a-hōanga and finds the island Aotearoa; he finds that it is full of Pounamu, and returns to Hawaiki to bring news of that. In Hawaiki there is much war, so a group of people choose to leave, and a group of large canoes are constructed to make the voyage.

=== The Voyage to New Zealand ===
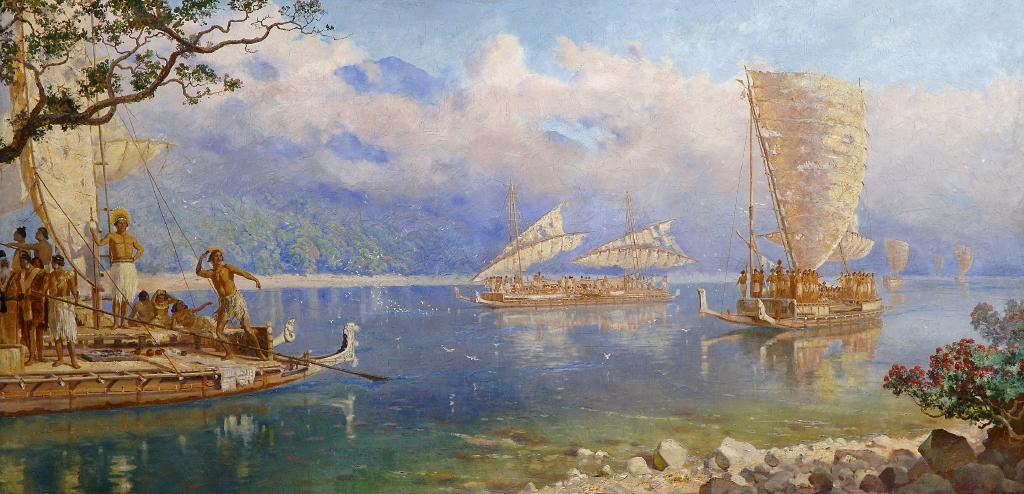
Kennett Watkin's 1912 painting, The Legend of the Voyage to New Zealand, depicts the landfall of migratory canoes, including the Arawa, at Whangaparāoa

Tamatekapua realises that his canoe, the Arawa, has no priest aboard, so tricks Ngātoroirangi and his wife Kearoa aboard and sets sail. Tama also steals away Whakaotirangi, the wife of Ruaeo; Roa' changes the evening stars and morning stars in response. On the voyage, Tama sleeps with Kearoa, and in anger Ngātoro calls up a whirlpool, leading to the loss of many provisions and some people, before he takes mercy and calms the seas again. Eventually, the canoe arrives at Whangaparāoa and discovers the coast full of red-flowered pōhutukawa and that they have landed near the Tainui.

The Tainui makes it to the small port of Kawhia, and the Arawa makes it to Maketu, where Ruaeo has already arrived. Rua' pulls the Arawa ashore with the 140 men that came with him, and he reconnects with his wife. Whakaotirangi mentions Rua' to Tama, who starts beating her, so she leaves with Rua'. Rua' challenges Tama to a one-on-one fight and beats him, and departs with his men but not with Whakataotirangi. They continue to travel and name places after events that occurred there.

Īhenga claims the land around Lake Rotorua by trickery. Ngātoro climbs Mount Tongariro, but struggles to reach the top through the snow, so he prays to the gods of Hawaiki to send fire to him and they turn the mountain into a volcano. Raumati hears that the Arawa is laid up at Maketu, and so goes with his men to burn it; though some consider maintaining peace, as it was war that drove them out of Hawaiki in the first place, they decide to wage war against Raumati.

=== The Curse of Manaia ===
In Hawaiki, Manaia holds a large ceremony to remove tapu; his wife Kuiwai does not heat her oven hot enough and the food for after the ceremony is undercooked. Manaia beats Kuiwai for that, and curses her brother Ngātoroirangi saying that if she does so again, he would serve the flesh of her brother the same way. Kuiwai sends her daughter to New Zealand to warn Ngātoro before the winds can bring the curse to him; her daughter and her companions make their way to New Zealand and find Ngātoro, who cleanses himself of the curse, curses Manaia in return, and builds a new canoe and sail to Hawaiki. Once there, the men cover themselves in blood from beating their own noses and pretend to be corpses as if the curse has been made true, and then wage war on Manaia's village. Manaia manages to escape the slaughter, and eventually brings a host of warriors to attack Ngātoro at his fortified village on the island Motiti in the Bay of Plenty. Ngātoro convinces Manaia and his warriors to anchor off the shore and to fight in the morning, and then calls for winds and storms. Tāwhirimātea hearkens to the calls, and the host of Manaia are destroyed overnight.

=== The Legend of Hatupatu and His Brothers ===
Hatupatu's brothers Hānui, Hāroa, and Karika spend much time trapping birds, but never share the good food with him, so he steals into the storehouse and eats the preserved birds, covering his tracks by making enough trails and giving himself some light injuries and pretending a war party stole the birds. He is successful in this for a time, until his brothers suspect him and lie in wait to catch him, whereupon they kill him. Their parents, suspecting Hatupatu's brothers of killing him, send a spirit to find him and resurrect him.

Hatupatu is taken by a woman named Kurangaituku who spears birds with nothing but her lips and who eats nothing but raw food. He steals her riches and runs away with Kurangaituku in pursuit; he escapes when he jumps over the hot springs at Rotorua and she wades through them and is burned.

Hatupatu returns home to his parents, who shelter him in their storage cave and give him the best food. His brothers notice their food is getting worse, and so when they find Hatupatu again they try to kill him once more. Their father tells them to direct their anger better, and to get revenge on Raumati for destroying the Arawa.

The brothers head for Maketu; each of the elder brothers has three hundred forty soldiers at their command but Hatupatu has none, so he makes a band of warriors out of roots and plants and dresses him in his cloaks. Hatupatu gives a number of speeches to his mock warriors, each in a different garb, to convey the impression of being a number of war chiefs. Hatupatu's brothers' men are driven back in disarray until Hatupatu breaks the enemy's will by striking down a chief in single combat, at which point his men are able to strike down their enemies and Hatupatu is able to find and kill Raumati. The warriors cook the bodies of their enemies and devour them, and they smoke their heads to preserve them. Hatupatu's father, impressed by Hatupatu's killing of Raumati, elevates him above his brothers.

=== Legend of the Emigration of Turi ===
Uenuku kills and eats Turi's son, and so Turi gets revenge by doing the same to Uenuku. One evening, Rongorongo, Turi's wife, hears Uenuku singing in his house and ascertains that he intends to kill Turi, and so he gets a canoe named Aotea from his father in law.

Kupe had previously explored large parts of New Zealand, so when he hears Turi dragging his canoe and finds that he is intending to flee, he gives him advice about getting to New Zealand. Turi tricks his brother in law Tuau into coming with him on his canoe.

The canoe Aotea was carrying much important cargo, including some dogs. When the canoe starts to take on water, the crew stop at a small island in the middle of the ocean and refit the canoes; they also kill one of the dogs for good and the other one as a sacrifice, and in so doing remove all ill luck from the canoes.

The tribe loses one boat, when Potoru is convinced that he should sail west rather than east. Turi has a child born during the voyage. Eventually, they reach New Zealand at the Aotea Harbour, move to Pātea, and form the ancestors of the Whanganui and Ngāti Manu tribes.

=== Legend of the Emigration of Manaia, the Progenitor of the Ngāti Awa Tribes ===
In Hawaiki, Manaia has the men of the tribe of Tupenu come make spears for him while he goes fishing to feed them. While he is gone, the workmen assault his wife, Rongotiki, which Manaia discovers through the omen of catching a fish by its tail. Manaia seeks revenge by tricking the workmen into making spears too heavy to effectively use and slaughtering them in an ambush.

When news of the ambush spreads, Manaia's tribe starts to come under attack, so he decides to seek a new land. He makes the canoe Tokomaru seaworthy and sacrifices his brother-in-law, who would not travel with him. Manaia's dog smells land and jumps off the canoe, swimming to Aotea, where the tribe finds the carcass of a whale. Conflict between the first canoes to arrive leads Manaia to travel throughout the island, eventually settling at the mouth of the Waitara River.

=== The Story of Hinemoa ===
Hinemoa, admired for her beauty and noble birth, was the daughter of Umukaria, a chief of the Ngāti Unui-kara-hapu tribe. Tūtānekai, although born from an affair between Rangiuru and Tūwharetoa, was raised as Whakaue’s son alongside his half-siblings.

Hinemoa and Tūtānekai fell in love during tribal gatherings, although her family forbade her from marrying. Tūtānekai often played music with Tiki, his hoa takatāpui, from a balcony on Mokoia Island, and the sweet sounds of their instruments would reach Hinemoa across the waters of Lake Rotorua. Hinemoa and Tūtānekai secretly planned for Hinemoa to join him on the island.

To prevent her from going to Tūtānekai, Hinemoa's friends removed all the canoes from the shore of the lake, and so Hinemoa decided to swim across the lake. She used six large gourds as flotation devices and set off under the cover of darkness, guided only by the sound of Tūtānekai's music. Exhausted, she reached a hot spring on Mokoia Island, where she disguised herself and broke calabashes to draw out Tūtānekai.

Tūtānekai recognised Hinemoa by her voice, and took her back to his house to consummate their love. The next morning, the other residents of the village were amazed to find Hinemoa there and married to Tūtānekai. Tiki mourned at this, and so Tūtānekai suggested that his younger sister Tupa marry him.

=== The Story of Marutūāhu, the Son of Hotunui, and of Kahureremoa, the Daughter of Paka ===
Hotunui arrives in Kāwhia on the Tainui, but is falsely accused of stealing sweet potatoes, so departs for Hauraki, leaving behind his pregnant wife. When his son, Marutūāhu, comes of age, he seeks out Hotunui in Hauraki. Upon arrival, Marutūāhu and his slave encounter the two daughters of Te Whatu, the chief of Hauraki, and the younger and prettier of the two claims him as her future husband. Hotunui is overjoyed to see his son and welcomes him with a feast. Marutūāhu ends up marrying the younger sister, and his younger brother Te Paka marries the older one. Marutūāhu has three children, from whom descend Ngāti Rongoū, Ngāti Tamaterā, and Ngāti Whanaunga.

During his time in Hauraki, Marutūāhu learns of the insult given to his father by another tribe who had refused to share their fish him. To get revenge, Marutūāhu spends months preparing fishing nets and eventually invites the offending tribe to a feast, under the pretense of stretching the nets. The nearly thousand men, occupied with the task, are trapped in the nets and slaughtered by Marutūāhu and 140 men in an event known as "the feast of rotten wood."

Te Paka's daughter, Te Kahureremoa, reaches the age for marriage at about the same time that a large party of visitors arrives from Aotea, and Te Paka arranges for her to marry the son of the chief from Aotea. Te Kahureremoa refuses to go with the tribe; when the chief returns with additional gifts she still refuses. Te Kahureremoa instead runs away to Takakōpiri, a great young chief that she has heard of, and marries him. She gives birth to a daughter from whom descend the principal chiefs of Ngāti Pāoa.

=== The Two Sorcerers ===
Kiki is a sorcerer that lives on the Waikato River of great power and killing ability; word of his skill reaches Tāmure, another skilled sorcerer from Kāwhia. Tāmure sets out by river with his daughter, and they manage to land without being seen. By having his daughter pretend to eat the food they are given and by reciting protective enchantments, Tāmure survives Kiki's enchantments and causes his death. Tāmure and his people escape by canoe, and deceive the villagers that pursue them.

=== The Magical Wooden Head ===
Puarata and Tautōhito dwell on the Sacred Mount with an enchanted head that bewitched all that dared approach their fortress, though many tried. Hakawau resolves to conquer it, and in a trance foresees that he will be able to. On the journey to the Sacred Mount, he repeats incantations to protect him, and he sends forth the spirits under his control to destroy the evil spirits of the fortress. Once in the fortress, he uses his sorcery to destroy all who resided within, including the sorcerer there.

=== The Art of Netting Learned by Kāhukura from the Fairies ===
Kāhukura visits Rangiaowhia; along the road, he finds a lot of mackerel on the side of the road, and determines from the small footprints that they were caught by fairies. That night he lies in wait for the fairies to return, and because he is of incredibly pale skin, he is able to join in with them in their fishing. Kāhukura delays them, and when the sun comes up and they can see that he is a man, they run away, leaving behind a net from which Kāhukura can learn their knotting patterns.

=== Te Kanawa’s Adventure with a Troop of Fairies ===
Te Kanawa is hunting kiwi with his dogs when his hunting party is set on by a troop of fairies. To attempt to amuse and please the fairies to save his life, he takes off his pounamu jewelry, and the fairies take similitudes of them and leave the people alone. In the morning, the hunting party leaves as soon as they are able.

=== The Loves of Takarangi and Raumahora ===
Raumahora is the daughter of Rangirarunga, a chief of the Taranaki tribe whose beauty was known to Takarangi, son of a chief of the Ngāti Awa tribe. The army of Ngāti Awa sieges the pā of Raumahora, but is not able to take it until the tribe starts to die of thirst. Rangirarunga appeals to Takarangi for water; Takarangi thinks that he would not like Raumahora to die of thirst, and so brings water. Raumahora likes the look of Takarangi, and takes him for a husband, ending the war.

=== Stratagem of Puhihuia’s Elopement with Te Ponga ===
Puhihuia is the chief's daughter in what is now Mount Eden; in old times, their tribe was at war with the tribes of Āwhitu and Waikato. Te Pongo, a young chief from Āwhitu visits Mount Eden, and is entranced by Puhihuia's dancing. He charms her with his dancing, and when they have an opportunity to talk they resolve to escape together. After a formal farewell, Puhihuia flees with Te Ponga and his men; her tribe attempts to pursue them but fails due to Te Ponga's sabotage of their canoes.

=== The History of Pāoa, the Ancestor of the Ngāti Pāoa Tribe ===
Pāoa, of the Ngāti Kahungunu tribe, goes on a journey after his wife leaves following a quarrel, but is unable to find her. He eventually settles in Waikato, remarries, and has children. He leaves his new wife for a slave, who he makes his slave wife, and his old slave returns to the principal wife and is prosperous with her. Pāoa is ashamed by his inability to provide for guests, and so departs again.

Pāoa settles in the village Mirimirirau on the Piako River, where he gains respect and is as a chief. His reputation spreads, and when a visiting party from his village visits Tukutuku, the unmarried daughter of a chief, they carry back word that she is interested in Pāoa. Pāoa sets out to visit Tukutuku at her village, and though he is initially hesitant, Pāoa accepts Tukutuku's advances and they are wed. They journey through her lands, receiving gifts and admiration, and Tukutuku impresses Pāoa's people in his village.

Later, Pāoa, now old, wishes to visit his other children. Despite warnings from his youngest son Horowhenua, he goes and is detained by his first two sons. Horowhenua leads a rescue mission, resulting in a fierce battle; he kills his half-brothers, Toawhena and Toapoto, and brings Pāoa back to safety. Pāoa's descendants are the Ngāti Pāoa tribe.

== Cultural impact ==
Polynesian Mythology was well received by the European public, with Grey receiving many letters of praise. In particular, the story of Hinemoa was popular enough to inspire Alfred Domett's novel Ranolf and Amohia, Nicholas Chevalier's painting Hinemoa, and New Zealand's first feature film in 1914.

Polynesian Mythology has been described as "one of the earliest published collections of Maori traditional material ... [and] also the most authoritative" and "an achievement unparalleled in Polynesian literature." Katharine Luomala wrote that the work "holds a place comparable to that of Malory’s ‘Morte d’Arthur’ in English literature. Sir George Grey is the Caxton to whom we owe gratitude for preserving this masterpiece.”

Scholarly critiques of Polynesian Mythology discusses the difficulties of constructing a single authentic version of the myths. Percy Smith reported that Te Rangikāheke "had never been educated as a priest, and consequently many old men of the Arawa tribe will tell you that his work is a pokanoa, or unauthorised proceeding, and not correct, inasmuch, as it leaves out much detail, and actions are frequently credited to the wrong individuals."

Additional critique grapples with ways in which George Grey himself interacted with the source material and contributors. Scholars note that Grey did not acknowledge in writing the contributions of any of the Māori sources that supplied him with manuscript pages (especially Te Rangikāheke), and that he made changes to those manuscripts that were not authentic to the tradition of the myths.
