= How Māui Found His Father and the Magic Jawbone =

- Author: Peter Gossage
- Illustrator: Peter Gossage
- Language: English/Māori
- Genre: Fiction
- Publisher: Penguin Group New Zealand
- Publication date: 1975
- Publication place: New Zealand
- Pages: 40 pp (Paperback)
- ISBN: 1869485785

How Māui Found His Father and the Magic Jawbone is a 1975 New Zealand children’s book and the first published book by Peter Gossage, a New Zealand author. The book is a retelling of one of the many stories about the mythical culture hero Māui. A new edition of this book was published and popularised in 2011 by Penguin Books New Zealand. This book is a prequel to many of Gossage's novels.

== Plot summary ==
At this point in the storyline, Māui has found his mother, Taranga, and bought her home with him to his village but was still curious who his father was. Taranga snuck out each day in the early morning. Māui decided to follow her and watched her leave the pā and leap into a hole down the hill. He followed her, chanting a karakia to turn himself into a rupe as he fell, before landing in a tunnel. Creeping along, he ventured into a vast underground land and spotted his mother under a pūriri tree with a man. He flew into the tree and dropped berries onto the man to make him look up but was stopped when the man got angry, demanding people of the underworld to throw stones at the cheeky bird. Māui dodged the stones and flopped to the man's feet. Before the man could pick up the rupe, Māui transformed back into his human form. Looking at one another, Maui and his father knew they were father and son. His father, Makeatutara, took him to a sacred waterfall, bathed him in the waters and chanted a karakia to give Māui more magical powers and everlasting power. Māui was happy to have his family altogether but unbeknownst to him, his father was upset because made a mistake while chanting the karakia that he knew would one day cost Māui his life. Muriranga-whenua, Māui's grandfather, lived in the underworld with his father and Maui would visit him each day to give him food. However, Maui was scheming and told his grandfather he would not give him anymore food if he did not give him the magic jawbone. His grandfather refused but at last he became too hungry and relented, so he slipped his magic jawbone from his mouth and gave it to Maui. He gave Māui special instructions on what to do and not to do with it, warning him about the wrath of Hine, the goddess of death. With the jawbone in his possession, Māui felt its power course through him and says:

I will tame the Sun!

I will find the Secret of Fire!

I will even defy Death!

In Gossage's later novels, Māui returns to the land above and does it all.

== Characters ==
- Māui – the hero
- Taranga – Māui's mother
- Makeatutara – Māui's father
- Muriranga-whenua– Māui's grandfather

== Mythology ==
As seen in the book, Māui follows his mother into the Underworld and his father later performs the magical baptismal and purifying ceremonies. In Māori mythology, his father made a slip in uttering the incantations because he was being hurried and this was ultimately the destruction of Māui.

In myths, Muri-Ranga-Whenua is actually a woman and not a man. In some tales she is an ancestress, in others she is an old chief but more commonly, she is his grandmother.
