= Apakura =

In Māori mythology, Apakura is the wife of Tūhuruhuru, the son of Tinirau. She had several children, among whom are Tūwhakararo, Mairatea, Reimatua, and Whakatau. In another legend, Apakura is said to be the wife of Tūwhakararo, who was the son of Rātā and father of Whakatau. Whakatau was born in a miraculous manner, from the girdle or apron which Apakura threw into the ocean which was made into a child by a sea deity (Tregear 1891:15).
