= Māui (Māori mythology) =

Māori culture hero

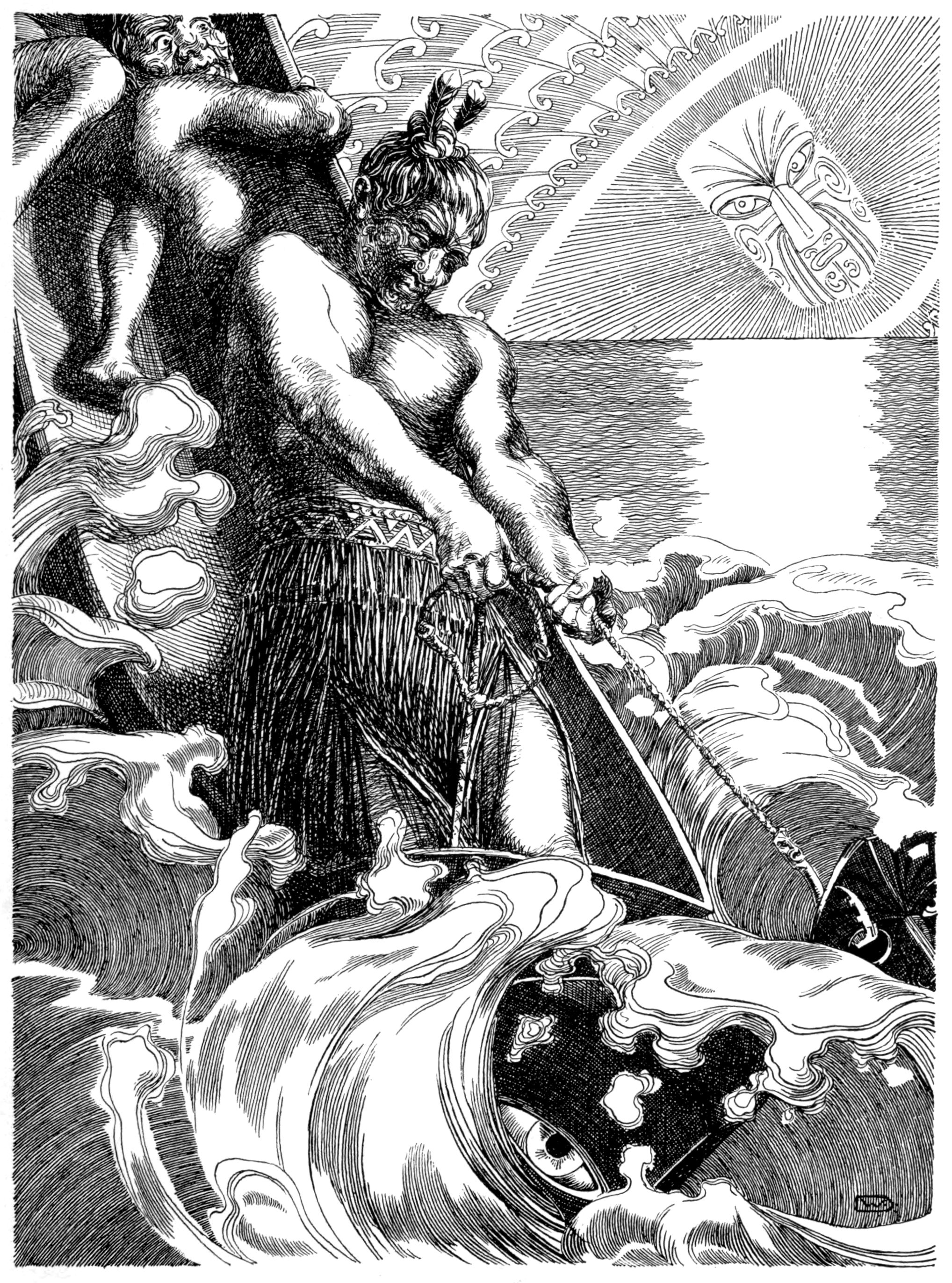
- Drawing of Māui pulling at his fish by Wilhelm Dittmer in Te Tohunga (1907)
- Other names: Māui-pōtiki; Māui-tikitiki; Māui-tikitiki-a-Taranga; Māui-tikitiki-o-Taranga; Māui te whare kino
- Gender: Male
- Region: New Zealand
- Ethnic group: Māori

Genealogy
- Parents: Makeatutara and Taranga
- Siblings: Hina / Hinauri, Māui-taha, Māui-roto, Māui-pae, Māui-waho
- Consort: Rohe, Hina (sometimes)

In Māori mythology, as in other Polynesian traditions, Māui is a culture hero, demigod and a trickster, famous for his exploits and cleverness. He possessed superhuman strength, and was capable of shapeshifting into animals such as birds and worms.

He was born prematurely and cast into the ocean by his mother, where the waves formed him into a living baby. He was discovered by his grandfather and later went to live with his siblings. One day he followed his mother to the underworld where he met his father, Makeatutara, who performed a birth ritual incorrectly. As a punishment from the gods for this mishap, Māui and all of humanity were doomed to die.

Māui is credited with catching a giant fish using a fishhook taken from his grandmother's jaw-bone; the giant fish would become the North Island of New Zealand, known as Te Ika-a-Māui. In some traditions, his canoe (waka) became the South Island, known as Te Waka a Māui.

His last trick, which led to his death, involved the goddess Hine-nui-te-pō. While attempting to win immortality for mankind, Māui entered her vagina, intent on leaving through her mouth while she slept. However, he was crushed by her obsidian vaginal teeth.

In myth, Māui constantly breaches tapu (ritual restrictions) and his name sounds like mauī, meaning 'left-hand side', the side associated with tapu's opposite, noa.

== Names and epithets ==
- Māui-tikitiki ("Māui the top-knot")
- Māui-tikitiki-a-Taranga ("Māui the top-knot of Taranga")
- Māui-tikitiki-o-Taranga (see above)
- Māui-pōtiki ("Māui the last born")
- Māui te whare kino ("Māui the house of trouble")

== Mythology ==
=== Parentage and family ===
Māui was the son of Taranga and Makeatutara, guardian of the underworld. He was born prematurely and his mother, fearing he would return as atua kahukahu (malevolent child spirits), threw him into the sea, wrapped in a tress of hair from her topknot (tikitiki) – hence Māui's full name is Māui-tikitiki-a-Taranga. Ocean spirits found and wrapped the child in seaweed and jellyfish. Māui's grandfather, Tama-nui-ki-te-Rangi, then found the child on the beach, covered by swarms of flies and gulls, and nourished him to adolescence.

When Māui became old enough, he travelled to his family's home and found his four brothers, Māui-taha, Māui-roto, Māui-pae, and Māui-waho, and his sister, Hina. The brothers are at first wary of the newcomer.

Later at night Māui came to his relatives while they were gathered in the marae, dancing and being merry. He crept in and sat down behind his brothers, and soon Taranga called the children and found a strange child, who at first she does not recognise and attempts to cast him from the house, but he proved to be her son. Māui was thus taken in as one of the family. Some of the brothers were jealous, but the eldest addressed the others as follows:

Never mind; let him be our dear brother. In the days of peace remember the proverb, 'When you are on friendly terms, settle your disputes in a friendly way; when you are at war, you must redress your injuries by violence.' It is better for us, brothers, to be kind to other people. These are the ways by which men gain influence – by laboring for an abundance of food to feed others, by collecting property to give to others, and by similar means by which you promote the good of others.

— Polynesian Mythology (1854)

After Māui performed feats such as transforming himself into different kinds of birds, his brothers acknowledged his power and admired him. Māui became frustrated that Taranga left before dawn each day and returned at night. He blocked the entrances and light sources to their house and stole her clothes to keep her there. When the sun rose, he discovered she would pull up a clump of tussock and descend through a tunnel to the underworld. Māui followed her there in the form of a kererū, finding his parents in a grove of manapau trees and dropped berries on their heads to get their attention. Taranga recognized him as her son and Makeatutara attempted to baptize him but rushed through the ritual, causing the gods to punish humanity with mortality.

=== Marriage ===
In a rare version, a goddess named Rohe was Māui's wife. He mistreated her in a cruel and unusual way. He wished for her to exchange faces with him because she was beautiful and he was not. When she objected, he recited an incantation over her as she slept. When she awoke and realised what had happened, she left the living world and travelled to the underworld where she became a goddess of death.

In some version, Māui's married his sister Hina. Over a period of time where Hina visited a bathing pool, Te Tunaroa, the father of eels, molested her. As revenge, Māui cut Te Tunaroa's body into bits, throwing them into different habitats where they became different kinds of fish; conger eels, freshwater eels, lampreys, and hagfish.

=== The Snaring of Tama-nui-te-rā ===
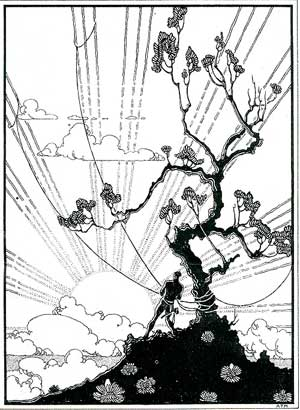
Maui Snaring the Sun, circa 1927.

In former days, the sun used to travel quickly across the sky, leaving not enough daylight time for working and eating. Māui proposed to catch the sun and slow it down. Armed with the jaw-bone of Murirangawhenua and a large amount of rope, which is in some tellings made from his sister Hina's hair, Māui and his brothers journeyed to the east and found the pit where the sun-god Tama-nui-te-rā slept during the night-time. There they tied the ropes into a noose around the pit and built a wall of clay to shelter behind. Tama-nui-te-rā was caught in the noose and Māui beat him severely with the jaw-bone until he surrendered and agreed to travel slowly across the sky.

=== The creation of Te Ika-a-Māui ===
Māui's older brothers always refused to let him come fishing with them. One night, he wove for himself a flax fishing line and enchanted it with a karakia to give it strength; to this he attached the magic fish-hook made from the jaw-bone that his grandmother Murirangawhenua had given him. Then he hid away in the hull of his brothers' waka. The next morning, when the waka was too far from land to return, he emerged from his hiding-place. His brothers would not lend him any bait, so he struck himself on the nose and baited the hook with his blood. Māui hauled a great fish, known as Hāhau-whenua, up from the depths. Thus the North Island of New Zealand is known as Te Ika-a-Māui (The Fish of Māui).

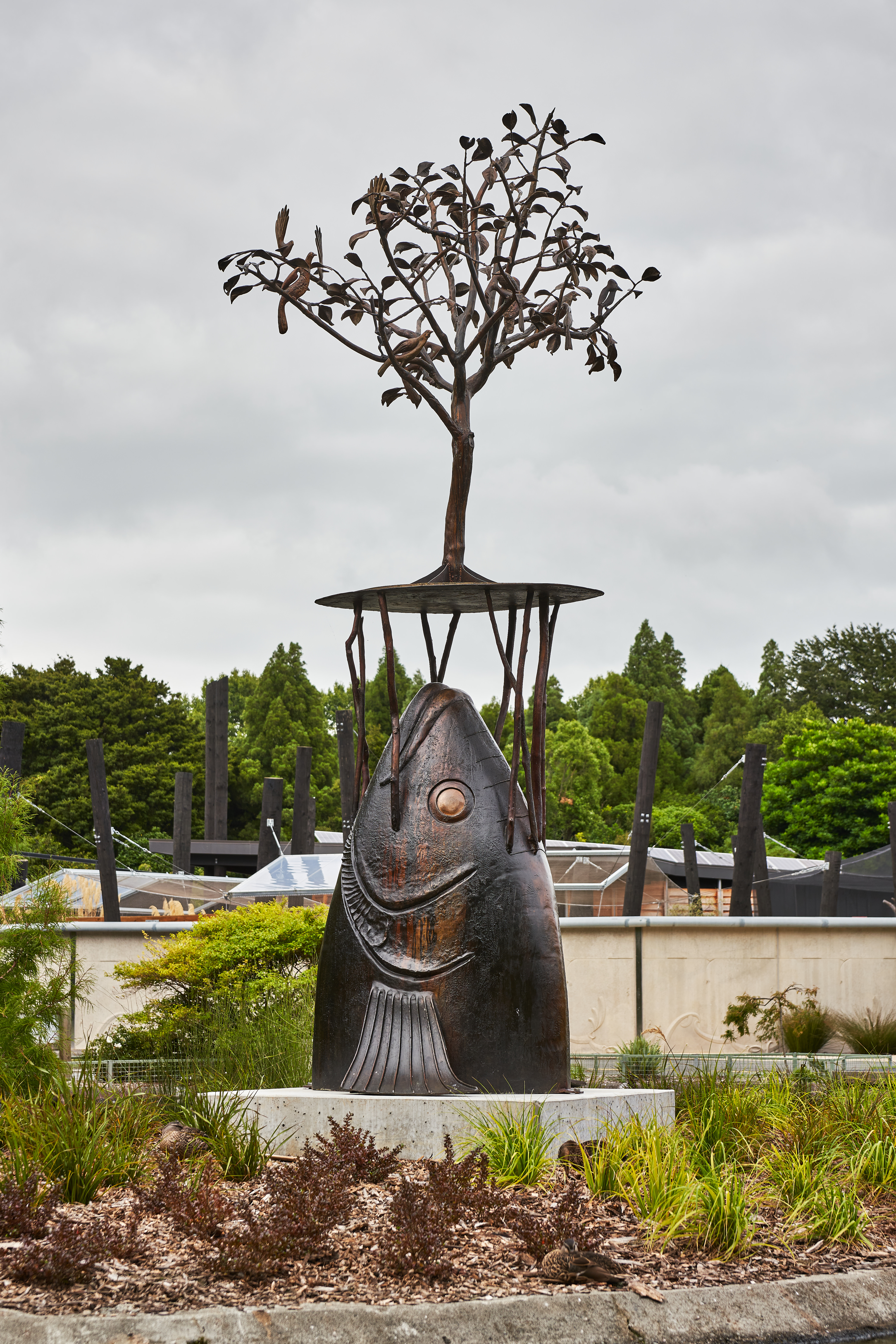
Dawn Chorus on the Fish of Māui, Paul Dibble (2019).

When it emerged from the water, Māui left to find a tohunga to perform the appropriate ceremonies and prayers, leaving his brothers in charge. They, however, did not wait for Māui to return but began to cut up the fish, which writhed in agony, causing it to break up into mountains, cliffs and valleys. If the brothers had listened to Māui, the island would have been a level plain, and people would have been able to travel with ease on its surface.

==== Additional traditions ====
In Northern Māori traditions of New Zealand, Māui's waka became the South Island, with Banks Peninsula marking the place supporting his foot as he pulled up that extremely heavy fish. Besides the official name of Te Waipounamu, another Māori name for the South Island is Te Waka-a-Māui, the canoe (waka) of Māui. Māui sailed on a waka called Mahaanui, which he left on top of a mountain in the foothills behind what is now Ashburton after pulling up the North Island. That mountain now bears said waka's name, and the coastline between Banks Peninsula and the Waitaki River is called Te Tai o Mahaanui ("the sea of Mahaanui").

A Kāi Tahu variation tells of Māui threw a giant to the ocean and then buried him beneath a mountain at Banks Peninsula. The next winter, the giant remained still underneath the mountain, but stirred during summer, which caused the land to split and form Akaroa Harbour. Māui would continue to pile earth on top of the giant, and the giant would continue to stir every summer, creating a lake and Pigeon Bay in the process, until finally the giant could not move anymore.

Southern iwi oral traditions however highly dispute Māui's catch of North Island: the South Island is known instead as Te Waka o Aoraki and predates Māui's expedition– Māui was told to have landed in Mahitahi (now Bruce Bay) following instructions of previous navigators before sailing around the island and going northward, and was surprised to find presence of fires started by "wild men of the woods" in the North Island. In south Westland, Kāti Māhaki ki Makaawhio's Te Tauraka Waka a Māui Marae is named in honour of the tradition stating that Māui landed his canoe in Mahitahi.

=== Mahuika ===
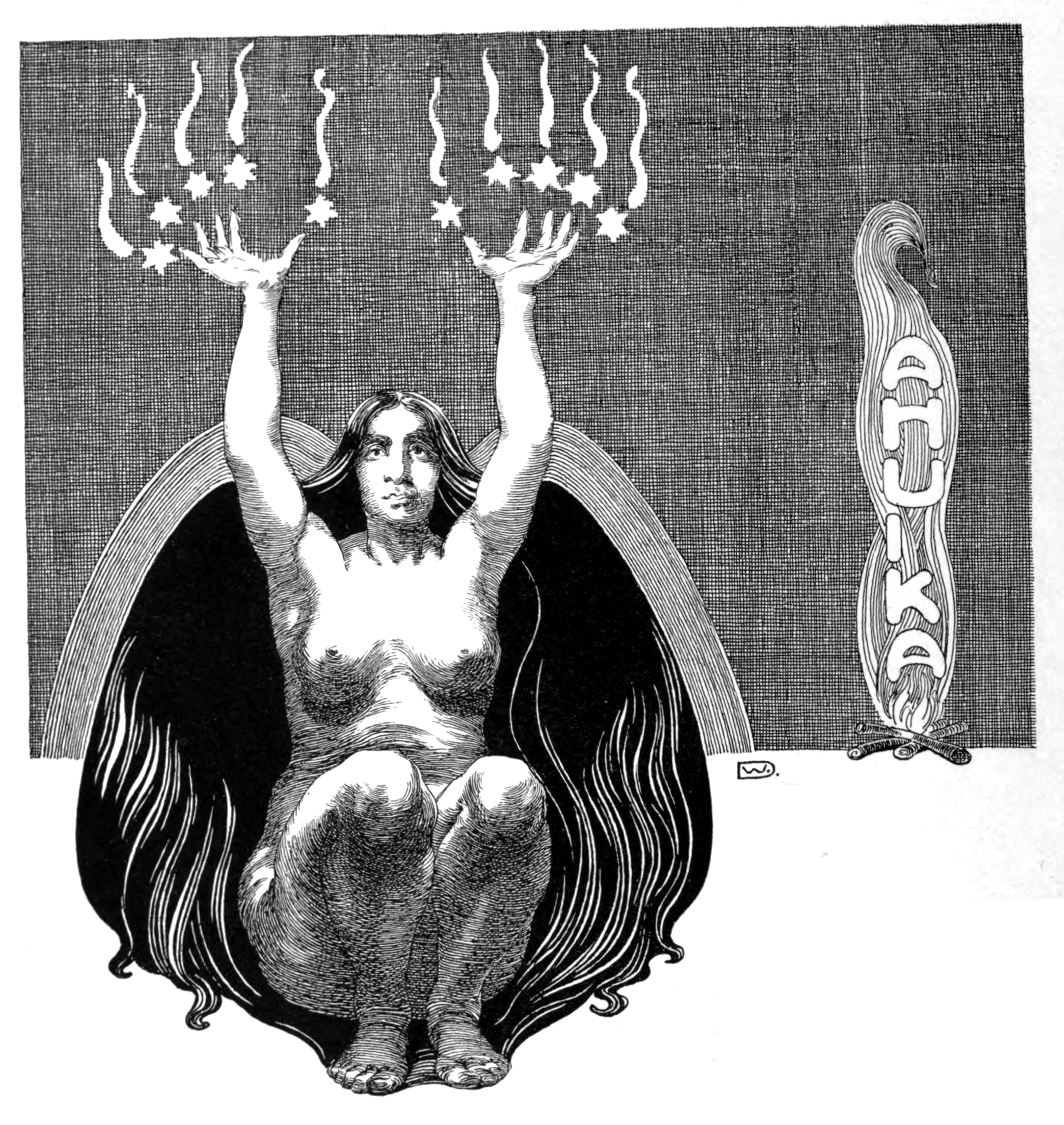
Mahuika in Te Tohunga, The Ancient Legends and Traditions of the Maoris (1907) by Wilhelm Dittmer.

Māui wanted to know where fire came from, so one night he went among the villages of his people and put all the fires out. Taranga, as the village rangatira, said that someone would have to ask Mahuika, the goddess of fire, for more. Māui visited her cave in a burning mountain at the end of the Earth, where she gave Māui one of her burning fingernails to relight the fires. Māui extinguished fingernail after fingernail until Mahuika became angry and sent fire to pursue Māui.

Māui transformed himself into a hawk to escape, but to no avail, for Mahuika set both land and sea on fire. Māui prayed to Tāwhirimātea, god of weather, and Whaitiri-matakataka, goddess of thunder, who answered by pouring rain to extinguish the fire. Mahuika threw her last nail at Māui, but it missed him and flew into groves of māhoe and kaikōmako trees. Māui brought back dry sticks of these trees to his village and showed his people how to rub the sticks together and make fire.

=== Irawaru ===
Māui went fishing with Irawaru, the husband of his sister Hina. During the expedition, he became annoyed with Irawaru; versions differ as to the cause. In some, Māui was jealous of Irawaru's success at fishing; in others, they disagreed when their fishing-lines became entangled; in still others, Māui was angry at Irawaru's refusal to give him a cloak, or disgusted at Irawaru's greedy nature. Whatever the provocation, when Māui and Irawaru returned to shore, Māui stretched out Irawaru's limbs and transformed him into the first dog. When Hina asked Māui if he had seen her husband, Māui told her to call "Moi! Moi!", whereupon Irawaru, in dog form, came running. Hina, in grief, threw herself into the ocean never to be seen again.

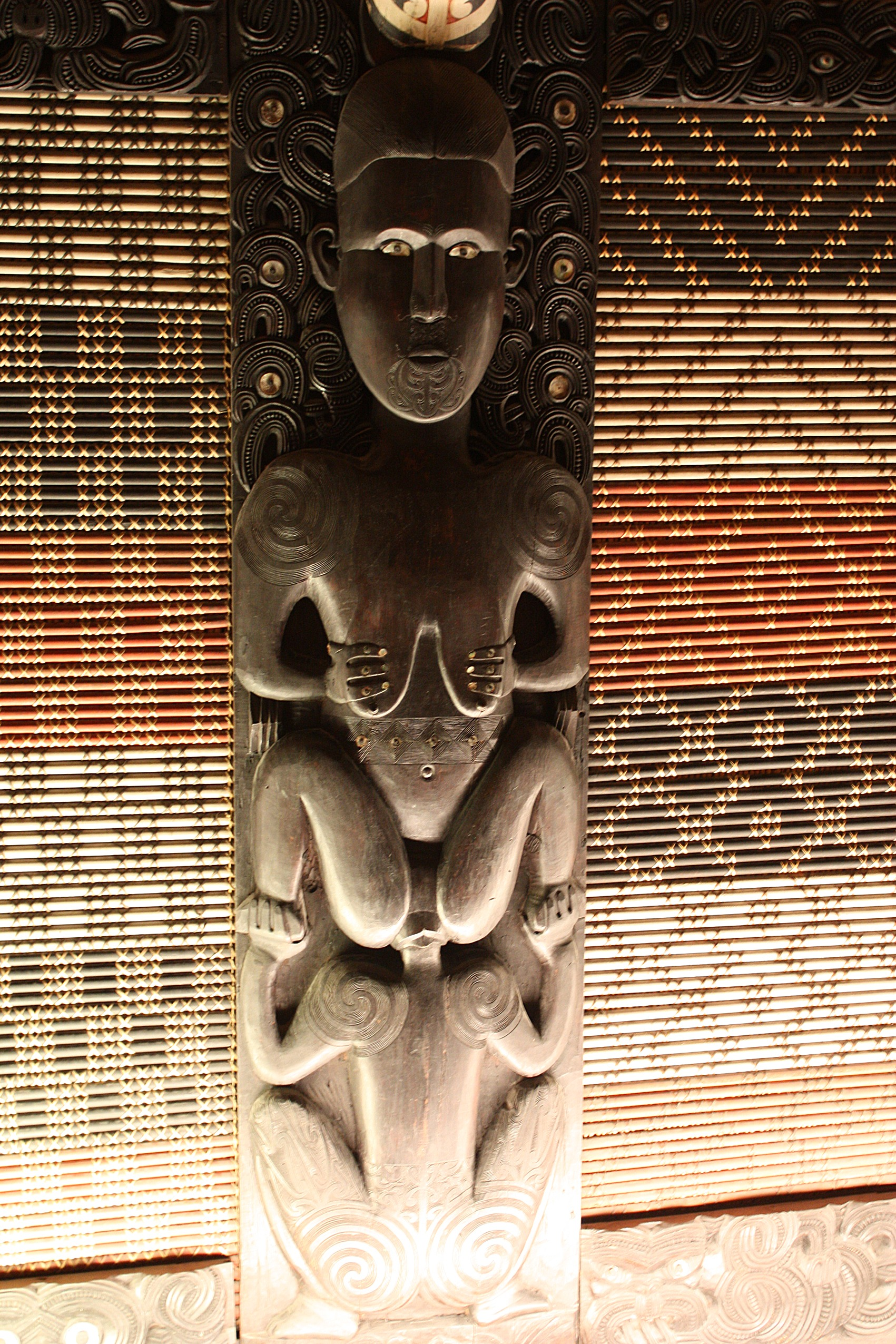
A pou representing Maui attempting to enter Hine-nui-te-po, set between tukutuku panels.

=== Death ===
The constellation Scorpius, known in Polynesia as Māui's fishhook.

Māui, confident after his early achievements, decided to pursue immortality for humankind by confronting Hine-nui-te-pō, goddess of the night. His father warned him he would fail due to flaws in his baptismal ceremony. Māui, undaunted, set out westward, with his companions, to the home of Hine-nui-te-pō. Depending on the version, his companions are a group of birds—the tomtit, robin, grey warbler and fantail—or his brothers. He finds Hine-nui-te-pō asleep with her legs apart, and he and his companions see sharp flints of obsidian and greenstone between her thighs. Turning into a worm or lizard, Māui tells his companion to not laugh as he climbed into Hine-nui-te-pō, until he emerged from her mouth. Once Māui's head and arms disappeared into the goddess, the fantail bird began to laugh, awakening Hine-nui-te-pō. The goddess claps her legs together and cut Māui in two, making him the first to die and all humans left mortal.

== See also ==
- Māui (Hawaiian mythology)
- Maui (Mangarevan mythology)
- Maui (Tahitian mythology)
- Maui (Tongan mythology)
- Ti'iti'i (Samoan mythology)
- Whakatau - Another mythical Polynesian (Māori) person with a similar birth to Māui.
- Mauisaurus - New Zealand plesiosaur named after Māui.
- Maui's Dolphin Endemic dolphin named after Te Ika-a-Māui.

Māui is also featured in a number of children's books by Peter Gossage including:

- How Māui Slowed the Sun
- The Fish of Māui
- How Māui Found His Father and the Magic Jawbone
- How Māui Found the Secret of Fire
