= Hāhau-whenua =

Great fish in Māori tradition

In a Māori tradition ascribed by John White to the Ngāti Hau tribe, Hāhau-whenua is the name of the great fish caught by Māui which became the North Island of New Zealand (In Māori the North Island is known as Te ika-a-Māui, the fish of Māui). When a fish took his hook, Māui said, 'A fish has taken my hook. Perhaps it is the fish called Hāhau-tangaroa ("search for the sea god"), or Hāhau-uru ("search for the west wind"), or Hāhau-whenua ("search for land").' When he pulled the fish up, he saw it was Hāhau-whenua (White 1887:116-117).
