= Sangone =

Sāngone (Samoan: sā, 'tribe', Fijian: (n)gone, 'child'), was the name of a turtle from divine origin and featuring in Tongan myths about the Tuʻi Tonga king named Tuʻitātui in the beginning of the 12th century AD. Part of the history features prominently in a famous lakalaka written by queen Sālote somewhere around 1940, when the shell, claimed to be the original one from Sāngone herself, was transferred to the Tupou College museum.

== Preamble ==
=== Version 1 ===
The beautiful goddess Hinahengi from Pulotu came to Mokotuʻu, a tract near Longoteme on Tongatapu, to wash her hair with the clay and then to dry it. She fell asleep. Then a Samoan named Lekapai came along, saw her, and tied her hair to the trees. He woke her up, but she could not get up because her head was immovable in the bonds. Hina begged to be liberated, and Lekapai agreed if she would become his wife. They were married and lived together for a very long time.

=== Version 2 ===
One day a great storm destroyed the plantation of Lekapai in Samoa. Lekapai swore revenge on the god of the winds and set out in his canoe. He arrived at an island, but there was no opening in the reef. The boat was turned over, but Lekapai made it alive to the shore. He went inland and came at a house where a beautiful girl was standing. She turned out to be the daughter of the wind god, who was sleeping at that moment. When the god slept it was calm; when he awoke there were storms. The girl told Lekapai to tiptoe to her sleeping father, to take a lock of his hair and to tie it to a big tree, then another lock to another tree, and so on. Next, the god was woken up and found himself powerless. Soon he and Lekapai came to an agreement. He would live here and marry the damsel, and the god himself would retire to some other premises in the bush. Lekapai and the girl lived together for a very long time.

== Death of Sāngone ==
Lekapai desired to visit his family in Samoa. His wife acquiesced and said that he could travel on the back of her mother, who happened to be a turtle with the name Sāngone. She gave him instructions on what to do and not to do.

Some say that Lekapai had a bunch of coconuts with him on his trip. Contrary to his wife's instructions, he broke one open on Sāngone's head and not on her shield. Others say that once he had arrived in Samoa, he directly went to see his relatives, leaving Sangone behind in shallow water, disobeying orders to leave her behind in deep water. Not only that, he also did not provide Sāngone first with fresh coconuts in a coconut leaf mat as he had promised. Next, either he, his family, or both, dragged Sangone out of the sea, killed her, cut her in pieces and ate her. Only the plates of her shield were wrapped in a fine mat and buried beneath a candlenut tree at Tuʻasivivalu, or a candlenut was thrown into the hole so that a tree would grow at that place. Loʻau Tuputoka (one of the many Loʻau in history), who was present, said to a young lad: "Lāfai, you will grow slowly (pana), and the day Sāngone is found, you will die." Since that time, the other was known as Lāfaipana ('Lāfai the dwarf').

Meanwhile, Lekapai had gone to sleep, and when he woke up, he found himself magically transported back into the house of the wind god. His divine wife knew everything, and angrily slew him.

This part of the story has many parallels with the story of Kae who misused Sinilau's whale in the same way.

== Quest of Fasiʻapule ==
Once upon a time Loʻau went to Tonga and reported the happenings to king Tuʻitātui, who expressed the wish to have these relics. According to other versions: Sāngone had been his pet turtle, but it had been stolen behind his back by the Samoans. He sent several envoys to get the shell. They all failed. Finally he entrusted the mission to his half-brother Fasiʻapule (in some versions he went himself). When the party arrived at Savaiʻi, Fasiʻapule spoke thus: "No one will do the apportioning (the giving around of the kava at a royal kava ceremony), except me." And when the first toast was given he said: "Fainting alone in the bush, leaf screeching and whistling." The Samoan hosts had no idea what he was talking about, and quickly sought consult with the ancient and decrepit dwarf Lāfaipana who lived in the bush. The latter told them that a wild hopa (plantain) standing lonely in the bush was meant, as ripe bananas bend down from the stalk, and that taro leaves picked by pulling them from the stem give a screeching sound. When the Samoans after that brought the Tonga party plantain bananas wrapped in taro leaves and cooked in the ʻumu, Fasiʻapule knew that the riddle was solved. Then he brought out a new toast with this statement: "Growling and lying down." Lāfaipana said it was a pig, a pig so huge that it could not stand on it legs but lay down and grunted for food all day. So a pig was dressed for the oven and served. Fasiʻapule took the feet, the back and the head for him, and gave the rest to his hosts.

In other versions, however, it was rather Lāfaipana who asked the riddles, and Fasiʻapule who had to answer them. The dwarf was extremely unwilling to reveal the burial place of Sāngone, because of the prophecy done to him. He only agreed to tell it to someone who would be clever enough to meet his wits. "Singing winds?", he asked. "A wild fowl flying low over the bush when startled", was the answer. "What gives dust when you clap your (cupped) hands?" Lāfaipana wanted to know. It was a bundle of dried kava roots which emits a cloud of dust when disturbed. When also Fasiʻapule showed that he knew how to apportion the kava at the congregation, Lāfaipana admitted defeat.

Queen Sālote summarised the riddles in the following stanza from her famous lakalaka Sāngone as follows:

Kisu kava ē mei Haʻamoa naʻe tali hapo e meʻa kotoa kisu ē: fūfū mo kokohu mo e: kau pōngia i vao ʻa e: lou tāngia mo kokī pea mo e: kapakau tatangi kau ai e: ngulungulu mo tokoto mo e vahe taumafa ʻo e fono.	Kava spitting (toasting) from Samoa were all answered and caught state this: clap with [cupped] hands it gives dust and: bunch fainting alone in the bush this: leaf that screeches and whistles and then: singing winds belong to it: growling and lying down and the sharing of the royal toast of the congregation.

== Obtaining the shell ==
Before he let the Tongans start digging under the then-dead candlenut tree, Lāfaipana had a personal request to make: he would like to have a branch for his dove to perch on. Fasiʻapule agreed, went to Niua, cut a toa tree and came back. "What is that?", Lāfaipana asked. "The perch for your dove", was the answer. "You fool, to cut a piece of wood for me to sleep with. I thought that if you can make riddles for me to solve, then you should solve mine. That dove is a woman for me."

But now Fasiʻapule proceeded to dig up the shell, and as soon as it became visible, Lāfaipana shrivelled up and died.

The shell of Sāngone was brought to Tonga and was kept as a precious heirloom by successive generations of Tuʻi Tonga. Until Laufilitonga, after becoming a Christian, sold it to a vessel, which sold it in Fiji. When king Maeakafa heard about it, he went to Fiji, searched for it and found some of the shell and brought it back to Tonga where it still is (see above). It is also said that the remainder was used to make a fishhook in possession of Tungī Mailefihi.
