= Tūwhakararo =

Mythological Māori chief

- Gender: Male
- Region: New Zealand
- Ethnic group: Māori

Genealogy
- Parents: Tūhuruhuru and Apakura, or Rātā and Tonga-rau-tawhiri
- Siblings: Mairatea, Whakatau
- Consort: Haukiri Maurea, or Apakura
- Offspring: Whakatau

Tūwhakararo was a chief in Hawaiki in Māori mythology. His murder and the subsequent war led to one of the reasons for the Māori's emigrating from Hawaiki.

Tūwhakararo went on a visit to the Āti Hāpai (or Raeroa) people, whose chief, Poporokewa, had married Tūwhakararo's sister Mairatea. In a wrestling match he was treated unfairly, and was killed in a treacherous manner. In revenge for this murder, his brother, Whakatau, set out with an army and destroyed Ati Hapai. In a South Island account, Tūwhakararo's wife is named Hakiri-maurea. In North Island versions, Hakiri-maurea is a young sister of Poporokewa; her rejection of a lover in favour of Tūwhakararo leads to the latter's death at the hands of the discarded suitor.

In some versions he is a son of Tūhuruhuru and Apakura, thus a grandson of Hina and great-nephew of Māui. In other versions, Tūwhakararo is the son of Rātā and Tonga-rau-tawhiri, and Tūwhakararo and his wife Apakura have a son named Whakatau. In yet other versions of the myth, he is the son of Rātā and Tongarautawhiri, and Apakura is his wife.
