= Irawaru =

Man transformed into the first dog by Māui in Māori mythology

In Māori mythology, Irawaru is the origin of the dog. He is the husband of Hinauri, the sister of Māui. Māui becomes annoyed with Irawaru and stretches out his limbs, turning him into a dog. When Hinauri asks Māui if he has seen her husband, Māui tells her to call "Moi! Moi!" whereupon the poor dog runs up to Hinauri. Learning the truth, she throws herself to Tangaroa (the ocean) never to be seen again.

Versions differ as to the cause of Māui's annoyance with his brother-in-law. In some, he is jealous of Irawaru's success at fishing; in others, he is angry at Irawaru's refusal to give him a cloak, or disgusted at Irawaru's greedy nature.

In other Ngā Puhi Nui Tonu mythology, three dogs were brought to Aotearoa by Kupe. These spirits were known as kehua or guardians brought over from Hawaiki. During the arrival to Aotearoa they were sent to Cape Reinga with a few men to guard the escape of their souls. The iwi later was named Ngāti Kurī. Their job was to guard the spirits through to the afterlife.

In traditional Māori society, dogs (kurī) were given the best cuts of meat and were highly regarded as sacred. Their fur was highly regarded for cloaks reserved for rangatira.

The story accounts for the characteristics of dogs: they warn of danger or night raids, they respond to commands, and are loyal companions that ward off evil spirits.

== See also ==
- Tinirau and Kae
- Kurī
