= Te Rangikāheke =

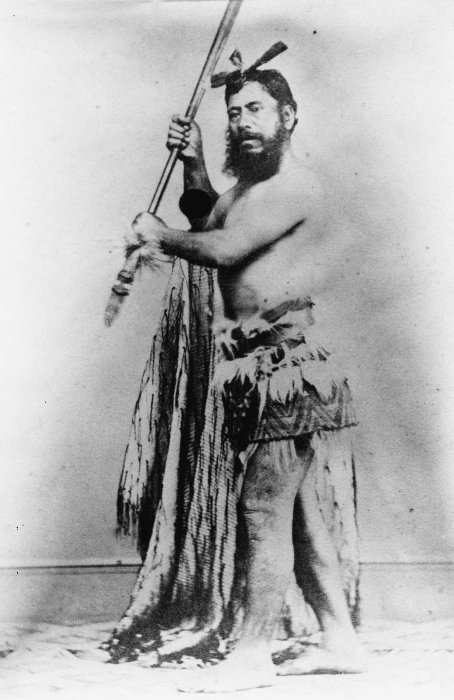
Wiremu Portrait

Te Rangikāheke (ca. 1815-1896), also known as Wiremu Maihi (William Marsh) by his baptismal name or Wī Maihi Te Rangikāheke was a New Zealand Māori tribal leader, and a writer, speaker, politician and, for many years, an employee of the early New Zealand government. He descended from the iwi (tribe) of Ngāti Rangiwewehi from Awahou on the northern shores of Lake Rotorua in New Zealand. Born around 1815 in the Bay of Plenty region, he played a crucial role in the preservation and documentation of Māori oral traditions and history.

== Early life and education ==
Little is known about Te Rangikāheke's early life and education in Māori lore and tradition, but in 1835, Thomas and Anne Chapman set up a Church Missionary Society mission at Te Koutu in Rotorua where Te Rangikāheke learnt to read and write in English. These would become some of the most important skills in his life.

== Career ==
Te Rangikāheke became a pivotal figure in recording Māori lore, traditions, and historical narratives. His collaboration with Sir George Grey, the Governor of New Zealand, was particularly significant. Between 1849 and 1854, Te Rangikāheke worked closely with Grey, who had a keen interest in Māori culture and history. During this period, Te Rangikāheke wrote numerous manuscripts that provided detailed accounts of Māori mythology, customs, and social structures. Te Rangikāheke authored over 800 pages of Māori manuscripts, covering language, genealogies, legends, traditions, contemporary history, political commentary, customs, proverbs, songs, literary critique, and autobiography. His manuscripts provided most of the prose for the appendices in Sir George Grey’s works: Ko Nga Moteatea me Nga Hakirara Maori (1853), Ko Nga Mahinga a Nga Tupuna Maori (1854), and its translation, Polynesian Mythology (1855). Consequently, Te Rangikāheke's writings form a significant part of the earliest records of Māori history and culture. Te Rangikāheke made his first visits to Auckland, the capital, in 1842 and 1843, recorded by Lady Martin, the wife of the then Chief Justice, on whom he called.

== Personal life ==
Te Rangikāheke was married at least three times. His first wife, Mere Pinepire of Ngāti Pikiao, a tribe from Lake Rotoiti, bore him three children.Their son, Hataraka, was killed fighting for the government in the New Zealand wars in 1869, and his two sons later died at boarding school. Te Rangikāheke’s daughters were Hiria Hauā, who had four children, and Ngārongo Pinepire. Letters Te Rangikāheke wrote to Grey on 13 May and 13 June 1851 indicate that Mere Pinepire was with him and their children during his work with Grey. Te Rangikāheke also married Tīrangi Repora, who had previously been Hataraka's wife.

== Legacy and recognition ==
Te Rangikāheke died in 1896, leaving behind a legacy of cultural preservation and advocacy. His funeral was unusually large. Archdeacon W. L. Williams delivered an address in Māori, and afterwards, the body was placed in a boat and taken to Ōrangi-kāhu height, about three miles away, for burial. Several newspapers published notices and obituaries highlighting his collaboration with Grey in compiling Māori traditions, his prominence in political, social, and literary spheres, his connections with governors, politicians, and civil servants, and his exceptional oratory skills. He was celebrated as a multifaceted and truly great man. His contributions to the documentation of Māori traditions have been recognized as instrumental in the survival and revival of Māori culture. Today, scholars and descendants alike continue to study and celebrate his work, ensuring that the rich heritage of the Māori people remains vibrant and accessible. Te Rangikāheke produced the earliest literature on Māori leadership, Te Tikanga o Tēnei Mea te Rangatiratanga o te Tangata Māori (1850). This helped to inform the development of contemporary literature on Māori leadership like Te Kai a te Rangatira – Leadership from the Māori world (2020).

== Selected works/publications ==
- Te Rangikāhke. (1849). Tupuna : [Address to the inhabitants of Hawaiki]. Grey New Zealand Collection.
- Te Rangikāheke. (1949). Maori religious beliefs and observances : genealogy : accounts of the Ancestors : waiata and whakatauki]. Grey New Zealand Collection.
- Te Rangikāheke. (1850). Te Tikanga o Tēnei Mea te Rangatiratanga o te Tangata Māori.
- Te Rangikāheke. (1854). Description of the ceremonies observed on the occasion of tattooing a chief and the method of performing the operation. Grey New Zealand Collection.
- Te Rangikāheke. (1992). The story of Māui. University of Canterbury.

== Further information ==
- Jenifer Mary Curnow - Wiremu Maihi Te Rangikaheke : His life and work. (n.d.). Auckland War Memorial Museum. Retrieved May 19, 2024, from https://www.aucklandmuseum.com/collection/object/am_library-manuscriptsandarchives-2379
- Kupu_TV. (2022, June 14). Wiremu Maihi Te Rangikāheke - Rethinking Oral History | Tarimano Marae, Awahou | Kupu Festival 2022. YouTube. https://www.youtube.com/watch?v=_H0N_KL-snk
- National Library of New Zealand. (2024). Te Rangikaheke, Wiremu Maihi, - 1896. https://natlib.govt.nz/records/22356611
- Loader, A.M. (2008). Haere mai me tuhituhi he pukapuka; Muri iho ka whaiwhai ai tātou; Reading Te Rangikāheke [Master's thesis, Victoria University of Wellington]. Te Waharoa. https://openaccess.wgtn.ac.nz/articles/thesis/Haere_Mai_Me_Tuhituhi_He_Pukapuka_Muri_Iho_Ka_Whawhai_Ai_Tatou_Reading_Te_Rangikaheke/16967293/1
