= Kae and Longopoa =

The story cycle around Kae and Sinilau is well known in Polynesian mythology, found in several places (see notes). This article describes the Tongan version, of which the main source is an old poem (Ko e folau ʻa Kae – The voyage of Kae) published in 1876, and some other, incomplete manuscripts.

The third player Longopoa in this respect is an outsider.

== Loʻau ==
It starts with Loʻau from Haʻamea, one of the many Loʻau known in Tongan history. Haʻamea may be the place of his lepa in central Tongatapu, or it may be an alternative name for Samoa (Haʻamoa in Tongan). He ran a famous navigation school on an artificial lake (lepa) near Fualu. Loʻau's boat was either a tongiaki (an old sailing boat of Tongan design) or a kalia (a better, more modern design originating from Fiji).

One day Loʻau got tired of people taunting him all the time about when he would go for a real trip. So he had his big canoe dragged to the sea and told his matāpule (chief attendants) Kae and Longopoa, to accompany him to some nearby islands. So they went. But when they passed Haʻapai, Loʻau told them to 'sail on past the shore'. The same thing happened at Vavaʻu and then Niuatoputapu, and then Samoa, and then Niuafoʻou, and then ʻUvea, and then Futuna. No one realised that Loʻau had already decided from the beginning to go beyond the horizon and not to return. He wanted to go to the land of the talking puko trees, probably Pulotu.

The ship steered on downwards (i.e. south or west in Tongan navigation sense). They came to a white sea; they came to a floating pumice sea; they came to a slimy sea. Eventually they reached the horizon at the end of the sky. There, there is a hole in the sky and a great whirlpool in the ocean, where the waters go in when there is an ebb tide in Tonga, and the waters come out at flood tide. There was also a reef with a pandanus tree and a large rock. The mast of the ship got stuck in the branches of the tree and had to be freed. This was done with a push, and that push caused the ship either to disappear in the whirlpool or through the opening in the sky, lost in space, never to be seen again.

Kae and Longopoa did not await this happening. They had agreed to desert this foolish trip and they made it back to the reef, Kae clinging to the tree, and Longopoa to the rock.

== Kae ==
When it got dark and the flood current came out again, Kae suggested Longopoa that they should find a way to escape from the island, every man for himself. He plunged in the sea and swam away. At midnight he landed on a sandy island; (other sources say many days later). He saw eight dead whales on the shore and hundreds of neiufi fish, or (according to other sources) fewer whales and 2 huge man-eating sharks, luckily also dead. It was the lair of the kanivatu, a giant bird (like the roc), which was known to be a man eater too. Kae wisely hid for the night between two of the whales. The bird returned to its nest in the morning. While it was preening its feathers, Kae emerged and clung to one of its legs (or the feathers of its breast according to some, or of its wing according to some). At midday the bird flew away over the ocean, with his passenger, and when Kae saw they were over land, he let go. The place where he landed was on the coral sand beach of ʻAkana (Aʻana in Samoan), the western part of ʻUpolu. He was friendlily received by the high chief of the area, Sinilau, who gave him status, more than he ever had gotten in Tonga, but not enough to enter the kava circle. So Kae stayed in Samoa for some time. But then he was seized by a longing for Tonga to tell about all the wonderful things he had seen, and he announced to Sinilau that he wanted to go. Sinilau agreed and presented him with a farewell gift. He would be allowed to ride on the back of Sinilau's twin whales.

=== Tonga and Tununga ===
Sinilau's aunt had a daughter who one day ate a piece of whalemeat, which was left over in the house. She got pregnant and bore a twin, who were named Tonga and Tununga-tofuaʻa (tofuaʻa: whale). They were whales. Sinilau spoke: "Go well Kae, just tell the whales whereto to go. But leave them in deep water at the coast. And when you have reached your home, before you go to your relatives, prepare a bunch of coconuts, scented oil, some unpainted tapa and a floormat, give it to them to return to me." This was a very modest request, and Kae agreed.

Kae had the trip of his life. Too soon he was back at Tongatapu, at Poloʻa, where the tidal flats start, and it was just low tide. He left the whales in shallow water and sped to Haʻamea. He told his relatives what had happened, and then shouted out to all his friends from Fatai and Matafonua and Lakepa and so on, that they came with knives and spears and axes to slaughter those whales on the beach. Tununga was killed, cut in pieces, the meat was distributed to all the chiefs of the different districts, and eaten by the people of the whole island. But Tonga was able to escape. A depression in the middle of the tidal flats, a fishing pool is still visible as a result of its struggle to get away.

=== Sinilau's revenge ===
Sinilau was extremely displeased about Kae's behaviour, when Tonga told him what had happened, after he had arrived at ʻAkana; with his back full of spears, and without the promised items. Sinilau called all the gods of Samoa to a council and ordered them to assemble at both Hunga Haʻapai and Hunga Tonga. There they would have to cut coconut tree leaves to plait some baskets out of it. "Then tonight go around", Sinilau said, "and collect the dung of all the people who partook in the meal. From Muifonua to ʻEua to Fangaleʻounga to Hihifo to Nāpua. Finally put Kae on top of the shit and bring everything back to me." So it was done, and Kae was brought into Sinilau's boatshed, he did not even wake up.

As dawn was approaching, a rooster crowed. "That stupid rooster", Kae mumbled half asleep, "he crows like Sinilau's rooster. At daylight I shall kill it and eat it." He thought he was still at home on Tongatapu. But when daylight had come he saw that he was there no longer but in a certain boatshed in Samoa. And a stern Sinilau with a royal turban on his head sat at the entrance. Kae had nothing to say.

Sinilau threw him out, to the waiting gods, who fell on him and ate him. Although others say that Sinialu threw him in a pre-dug grave, noting that Kae was not worth more, once a commoner, always a commoner.

Meanwhile, a big kava bowl was brought and all the parts and shit the gods had collected in Tonga was thrown in, and see after having left it to itself for a while, suddenly Tunungatofuaʻa came back to life. He was only missing one tooth, as the Tongans had brought that as a gift to the Tuʻi Tonga in Muʻa, which had made it untouchable even for the gods. Sinilau suggested that Tununga should not try to smile too much.

== Longopoa ==
Meanwhile, Longopoa was left behind on his rock at the end of the world. Once Kae had left his pandanus tree, the other hesitated a while, but then finally he swam away too. He reached a small deserted island where only a puko tree grew. But it was a magic tree, it talked. And when Longopoa cried that he was hungry, the tree instructed him to make and light a ʻumu, and then to break off one of its branches and to roast it. When at the end he opened the oven, see it was full with roasted pig, fowl, yams and so forth. He ate his belly full and slept.

But next day he cried again: he wanted to go back home, to Tonga. The tree then told him that tonight the gods would go fishing. He should ask them to let him go with them, and he would carry their bag for them. "Make a hole in the basket so that the fish drops out and it does not fill too swiftly. Because once the basket is full, the gods will stop. But if not, they will go on and on fishing. And when you reach your home island, crow like a rooster so the gods will think the night is over. Now also break off another branch of me and take it with you. As soon as you come home and while it is still night, plant it. A young puko tree will grow out of it, and provide you and your people with food as I did yesterday. Do not go to see your relatives first, because if you plant this branch after the day has dawned, it will only grow to be just an ordinary tree."

So the friendly puko tree said, and so it happened. The gods fished and fished, and when they reached Samoa they were surprised to hear from their new carrier that the basket was not yet full. And at Niuatoputapu it was still not full. Next they reached Tonga. Longopoa jumped overboard, ran ashore and crowed like a rooster. The gods made themselves scarce. Overjubilant Longopoa directly went to see his family. Only when the new day had come he remembered the love of the puko tree. But then it was too late, the blessings were spoilt and the puko trees of nowadays produce no food whatsoever.

== Notes ==
The story as told on other island groups:

- Tinilau and ʻAe – Samoa
- Tinirau and Kae – Māori
- and also compare with the Tongan myths of Sāngone and ʻAhoʻeitu.
