= How Māui Found the Secret of Fire =

1984 book by Peter Gossage

- Author: Peter Gossage
- Illustrator: Peter Gossage
- Language: English/Te Reo Māori
- Genre: Fiction
- Publisher: Penguin
- Publication date: 2009
- Publication place: New Zealand
- Pages: 35 pp (Paperback)
- ISBN: 0143503790

How Māui Found the Secret of Fire is a 1984 New Zealand children’s book by Peter Gossage, a New Zealand author. The book follows Māui, who wants to know what will happen if he puts out all the fires in his pā. A few new editions of this book were published and popularised in 2009 and 2012 by Penguin Books New Zealand.

== Plot summary ==
The fourth installation in the Māui universe follow the curious trickster in his mission to find out what happens if all the fires in the pā went out. When everyone was asleep, Māui took gourds of water and put out every fire in the pā. When they all woke, they were furious him and demanded he go retrieve more fire from the volcano. Since no one wanted to go along with him, Māui took the hihi, rupe, tūī, piwakawaka, huia, kiwi and pukeko with him. They journeyed for miles before finding the dry and bare volcano, where Māui ventured into alone. Māui comes across his aunty, Mahuika, the Goddess of Fire, and pleads for her to share her fire with him. With flames for nails on each finger, she plucked one flame off a finger and gave it to him. Māui was not satisfied with this because he still did not understand how the fire was made and so he dropped the flame into a stream and returned to Mahuika with the excuse that it burned out. He continued to waste each flame given to him, making up different excuses each time. By the time Mahuika was down to her last flame, she was angry at Māui and refused to give it to him. He tried to snatch the flame from her, but the goddess stamped her foot which caused flames to rear up from the floor. Māui broke out into a run as he tried to escape the flames engulfing him. Māui began chanting a karakia to turn himself into a kāhu and flew into the branches of a kaikōmako tree. Once his aunty had calmed and left him to be, Māui broke off some branches from the tree he hid on and made his way back to his people where he retold the story of his adventure. He believed that Mahuika's last flame was hidden inside the kaikōmako wood. Māui started a fire by rubbing the wood together and blowing into it. A fire started and the village celebrated alongside Māui.

== Characters ==
- Māui - The trickster
- Mahuika - Māui's aunty and the Goddess of Fire

== Mythology ==
Going further into specific, the more generally accepted version of the myth states that Mahuika was the goddess of artificial fire, who kept the volcanoes alight while Māui was precisely seeking out the seeds of fire.

In other versions, after Māui fished up New Zealand, one of the gods set fire to Hawaiki and Heaven, in retaliation, poured down masses of rain to extinguish the flames. The sparks that ricocheted from the fire found solace, away from the rain, in trees and the only way to obtain the fire, after the attack, was from the wood by friction.

In some traditions, Māui planted Mahuika's fingernails in the trees to make fire. In other versions of the legend, Mahuika is regarded as Maui's grandmother, instead of his aunty.

Tāwhirimātea, the God of wind, is a present character in the Māori myth but is not mentioned in the Gossage novel. In the myth, despite Māui transforming into a kāhu, the flames were too strong and grazed the underside of his wings, causing immense heat all over his body. He tried to cool it off in a river, but his body only made the water boil. Helpless, Māui called on his ancestor Tāwhirimātea for help. A mass of clouds gathered with heavy rain to put out all the fires.

== See also ==
- Mahuika
- Hawaiki
