= How Māui Slowed the Sun =

1982 New Zealand book by Peter Gossage

- Author: Peter Gossage
- Illustrator: Peter Gossage
- Language: English/Te Reo Māori
- Genre: Fiction
- Publication date: 31 December 1982
- Publication place: New Zealand
- Pages: 36 pp (Paperback)
- ISBN: 1869485734

How Māui Slowed the Sun is a 1982 New Zealand children’s book by Peter Gossage, a New Zealand author. The book is a retelling one of the many stories about the mythical culture hero, Māui. The book follows Māui as he proposes the idea to catch the sun and slow it down because daylight time is not long enough causing working and eating to be cut short.

== Plot summary ==
The book begins with the issue of Te Ra, the sun, who moved across the sky too quickly causing shorter days for everyone. Māui gathers his four brothers and suggest they catch the sun and slow him down. Some of the brothers disagreed but helped him regardless. They made strong ropes out of flax to snare the sun where it rises. The brothers travelled to where the sun rises but only moving at night to ensure he didn't know they were coming. They found a pit in the ground where the sun had yet to rise and using clay, they built a wall of earth to hide themselves behind. When the sun rose, the light nearly blinded the brothers but Māui muttered a here (a Māori charm). The brothers threw ropes over the sun which tangled in Te Ra's hair and looped around his body. Māui then leapt onto the wall and hit the sun of the head with the magic jawbone from his grandfather. Despite the fight, Māui told Te Ra he wasn't going to kill him but that he'd just make him move more slowly. The harsh ropes on his body caused Te Ra to feel tired and weak so when the brother's released him, he slowly floated through the sky.

== Characters ==
- Māui – the hero
- Te Ra – the Sun

== Mythology ==
This book was inspired by Māori mythology. Oral storytelling is important to promulgate cultural traditions and values. Like many native people, the culture of the Māori was highly oratory. Maui's capture of Te Ra is a story that’s been handed down through the generations, to not only educate but entertain.

The book and the myth are similar with some differences. In the myth, Māui and his brothers decide to slow down Te Ra when they were making a hāngi for their evening meal and had just finished heating the stones, when the sun went down, and it quickly became too dark to see. Māui was annoyed with having to eat his food in the dark and hence the idea was put forth. Something else that is in the myth but not in Gossage's book is how collecting flax to create the ropes was a collective contribution, as the whole village helped. Māui also chanted a karakia (prayer) to invoke spiritual guidance and protection.

“Taura nui, taura roa, taura kaha, taura toa, taura here i a Tamanuiterā, whakamaua kia mau kia ita!”

While the book only mentions the use of clay, Maui and his brothers also collected water on their way to Te Ra which was used to soften the clay as they built the walls to shelter from the sun’s heat.

== Legacy ==
The book, despite being a myth, has some realistic truth to it. Today, Māui's story is brought to life among the nine carved pillars and the stories of the guides, when you visit Maunga Hikurangi for the world’s first sunrise. Maunga Hikurangi is the highest peak in the Raukumara Range and is recognised as the first point on the New Zealand mainland to greet the morning sun. Māori legends from the tribe native to this region, Ngāti Porou, say that when Māui fished up the North Island of New Zealand, Mount Hikurangi was the first point to emerge from the sea. Up on the mountain stands nine Whakairo (Māori carvings) depicting the legends of Māui and his whanau. The centrepiece represents Māui himself, while the other eight carvings are positioned to mark the points of the traditional compass. Created in 1999, under the tutelage of Derek Lardelli, to celebrate the new millennium, the whakairo stand as a tribute to the cultural heritage of Ngāti Porou, and as a legacy for future generations.

== Awards ==
In 2013, Gossage won the Storylines Gaelyn Gordon Award for a much-loved book.

== See also ==
- Māui
- Māori
- Te Ara
