= Hākuturi =

Creatures from Māori mythology

In Māori mythology, the hākuturi are guardians of the forest. They are responsible for guarding the forest, and to avenge any desecration of its sacredness. When Rātā cut down a tree without first making the proper incantations and rituals, the hākuturi rebuked him by re-erecting the tree. When he showed remorse, they felled the tree again and made it into a canoe for him in a single night. The hākuturi seem to have been regarded as birds or birdlike: one source calls them the children of Tāne, god of the forest and ancestor of birds (Orbell 1998:23–24). A Ngāti Kahungunu version (White 1887–1891, III:2) refers to 'the host of Haku-tiri, of Roro-tini, and of Pona-ua'. This last word would seem to imply some relationship to the Ponaturi (Tregear 1891:43).
