= Kinilau =

Figure in Hawaiian religion

In Hawaiian religion, Kinilau is the son of Menehune, son of Luanuʻu. Hawaiians claim descent from the youngest of the twelve sons of Kinilau-a-mano.

== See also ==
- Tinirau – general Polynesian
- Tinilau – Samoa
- Tinirau and Kae – Māori
