= The Fish of Māui =

1981 novel by Peter Gossage

The Fish of Māui/Te-Ika-a-Māui
- Book cover
- Author: Peter Gossage
- Translator: Merimeri Penfold
- Illustrator: Peter Gossage
- Language: English/Te Reo Māori
- Genre: Fiction
- Publication place: New Zealand
- Pages: 32 pp (Paperback)
- ISBN: 1869431340

The Fish of Māui, also known as Te-Ika-a-Māui, is a 1981 New Zealand children’s book by Peter Gossage, a New Zealand author. The book is retelling of the traditional Māori legend of how Māui fished up the North Island (Te Ika a Maui) of New Zealand when he sneaks onto his brothers' canoe after they have refused to take him fishing.

== Plot summary ==
The book introduces Māui, who has magical powers and is much better at everything than his brothers. As a result, his four foster brothers were jealous of his skills and set out one day to go fishing, without telling him. However, early the next morning Māui would hide himself in the bottom of his brother's canoe. The brothers called him Nukurau, the trickster, and had no clue he was in the canoe with them. The brothers travelled out into the water but before they could settle in an open space, Māui jumped up from his hiding space, telling them to go further. The brothers did as Atamai, the quick-witted, Māui said. Māui paddled by the light of Marama, the moon, so even when all his brothers fell asleep, he continued to wade in the water until morning, when he was finally satisfied. His brothers did not share their bait with Māui and so instead he struck himself on the nose and smeared his own blood all over the magic jawbone hook, given to him by his ancestors. When Māui swung his hook, it descended into the sea and caught onto what Māui thought was a big fish but was actually a Tekoteko of a whare. He was not landing a fish; he was fishing a land. Māui chanted a karakia that passed down the line as the fish fought him. His terrified brothers made no move to help but Māui hauled the line in and with will stronger than the fish's fury, Māui pulled the giant fish to the surface. Its tail stretched north, and his head lay in the south. Māui told his brothers he would go retrieve his hook from the sea and warned them not to damage the smooth, flat surface of the giant fish. The four brothers did not listen and hacked out their share of the fish. In no time, the once smooth back was a jagged mess of valleys and ranges. The fish of Maui was now a rugged land. This land was Te Ika a Maui, more commonly known as the North Island of New Zealand.

== Characters ==
- Māui - The trickster
- Roto - One of Māui's foster brothers.
- Mua - One of Māui's foster brothers.
- Pae - One of Māui's foster brothers.
- Taha - One of Māui's foster brothers.

== Mythology ==
Like many of Gossage's other publications, this book was inspired by Māori mythology and the legend of the North Island. Just like the book says, the Māori myth recites how Māui's brothers began carving out pieces of the huge fish, creating the many valleys, mountains, and lakes that you see today on the North Island. Over many thousands of years, those valleys and mountains became part of the landscape of New Zealand, Aotearoa, as we know it today and in time birds, plants, animals and people populated the giant fish of Māui. Since then, the magical hook, according to legend, became the cape which now forms the southernmost tip of Hawke's Bay. Te Rangihaeata of the Ngāti Toarangatira tribe dictated that if the brother's had not fought over the fish, then the land would have retained its fish shape. As well as this, in the myth, the whare that Māui's hook fastened onto was the underwater house of Tonganui, the grandson of Tangaroa, God of the sea.

When looked at today, the head of the fish sits on the southern end of the North Island, now recognised as Wellington, while the tail stretches to the very tip of the country in what we know as the Northland region. Just next to the tail is a wedge which is now the modern day Coromandel Peninsula.The left fin represents Taranaki and the right fin represents the East Coast.

== See also ==
- Māui
- Te Ika a Maui
- North Island
