= Tinirau and Kae =

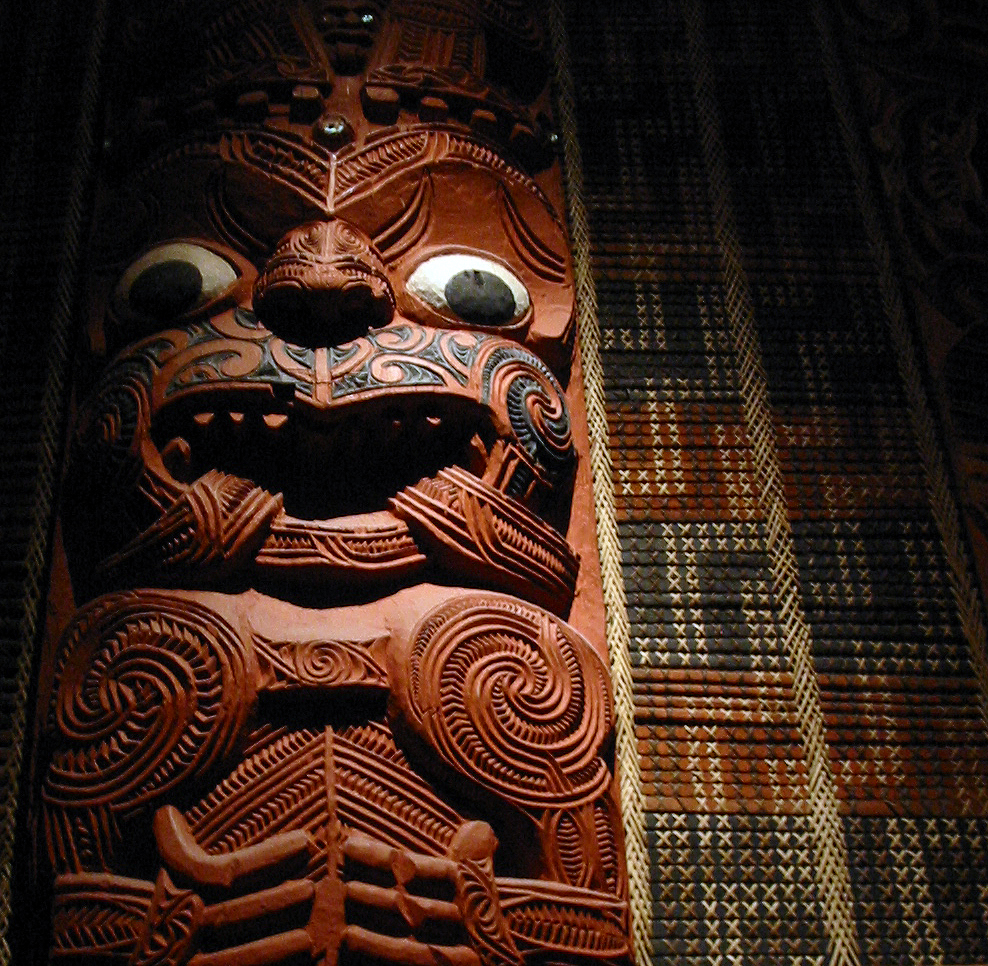
Carved house post from a 19th-century Māori meeting house.

In Māori mythology, Tinirau is a guardian of fish. He is a son of Tangaroa, the god of the sea. His home at Motutapu (sacred island) is surrounded with pools for breeding fish. He also has several pet whales.

Hinauri, sister to the Māui brothers, had married Irawaru, who was transformed into a dog by Māui-tikitiki. In her grief Hinauri throws herself into the sea. She does not drown but is cast ashore at the home of Tinirau, where she attracts his attention by muddying the pools he uses as mirrors. She marries Tinirau and uses incantations to kill his other two wives, who had attacked her out of jealousy.

When her child Tūhuruhuru is born, the ritual birth ceremony is performed by Kae, a priest. (Note: In some versions, Hinauri (or Hine-te-iwaiwa) and her child leave Tinirau, departing into the sky with Hinauri's brother, Rupe (alias Māui-mua) who transforms himself into a pigeon and carries her off into the sky. In other stories, the child is left with Tinirau, who raises him.) After this is done, Tinirau lends Kae his pet whale to take him home. In spite of strict instructions to the contrary, Kae forces the whale, Tutu-nui, into shallow water, where it dies, and is roasted and eaten by Kae and his people. When he learns of this Tinirau is furious and sends Hinauri with a party of women (often they are Tinirau's sisters) to capture Kae, who is to be identified by his overlapping front teeth. The sisters perform indecent dances to make him laugh. (Note: The proverb “Ka kata Kae” (Kae laughs) is used when a gloomy person is made to laugh, or when someone inadvertently reveals their guilt.) When he laughs, they see his crooked teeth. Then the women sing a magic song which puts Kae into a deep sleep, and carry him back to Motutapu. When Kae wakes from his sleep he is in Tinirau's house. Tinirau taunts him for his treachery, and kills him. Later, Tūhuruhuru is killed by the tribe of Popohorokewa for the death of Kae. In turn, Tinirau calls on Whakatau to destroy the Popohorokewa, which he did by burning them all in the house called Tihi-o-manono.

== South Island variant ==
In a South Island account, Tinirau, mounted on Tutunui, meets Kae, who is in a canoe. Kae borrows Tutunui, and Tinirau goes on his way to find Hine-te-iwaiwa, travelling on a large nautilus that he borrows from his friend Tautini. When Tinirau smells the south wind he knows that his whale is being roasted.

== See also ==
- Tinirau - general Polynesian
- Kinilau - Hawaiʻi
- Tinilau and ʻAe - Samoa
- Sinilau and Kae (and Longopoa) - Tonga
