= Ghosts and spirits in Māori culture =

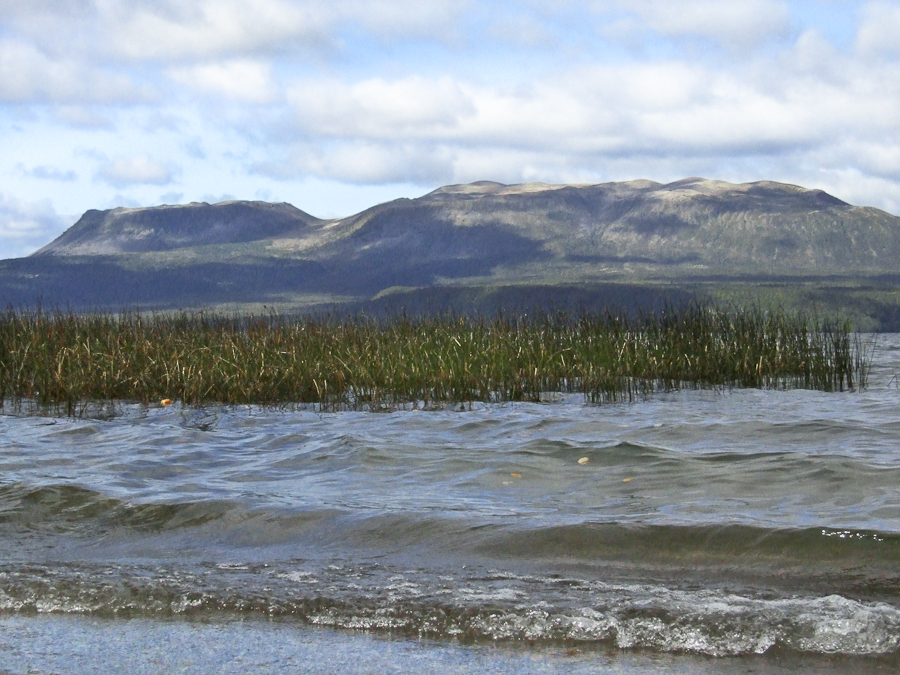
A phantom canoe was believed to have been seen by tourists at Lake Tarawera eleven days before Mount Tarawera erupted in 1886.

The topic of ghosts and spirits (kehua) in Māori culture is often considered a tapu subject, yet many Māori legends contain mentions of apparitions and paranormal occurrences. It is claimed that long deceased family members may appear to warn of upcoming danger, such as with the famous phantom canoe in 1886 that many reportedly saw on Lake Tarawera, that is believed to have been an omen for the volcanic eruption that occurred eleven days later.

Kikokiko are known in Māori belief as malevolent ghosts that take possession of living people, making them lose sanity. Taniwha are guardian monsters that reside in bodies of water such as rivers or lakes and can appear as sharks, whales, dragons or even floating logs.

== Death ==
Following a death, Māori custom requires the body of the dead be returned to its whānau (family) as soon as possible. The whānau is then called onto a marae for a tangihanga (funeral) to remove sadness and clear the spirits. The ghosts and spirits are called to join those who are already living in the afterlife. It is believed that if certain rituals are not conducted, the whānau of a dead person are likely to face stress and unhappiness and if the spirits are not satisfied, they may choose to take someone else.

Sometimes, when a person was nearing death, beyond hope of further living, a procedure known as tuku wairua was traditionally performed by a tohunga priest, which helped the spirit leave the body so it would not become restless and wander. In modern times, a relative familiar with the procedure may perform the tuku wairua; however priests or ministers, generally Christian, may still be called to give the dying person a blessing. Many Māori people believe that the spirits of the dead watch over the living. For this reason, Māori families will hold unveiling services and blessings of gravestones of those who have been gone for a year or longer as a way of remembering and paying respects to those who have died.

== Departing place of the spirits ==
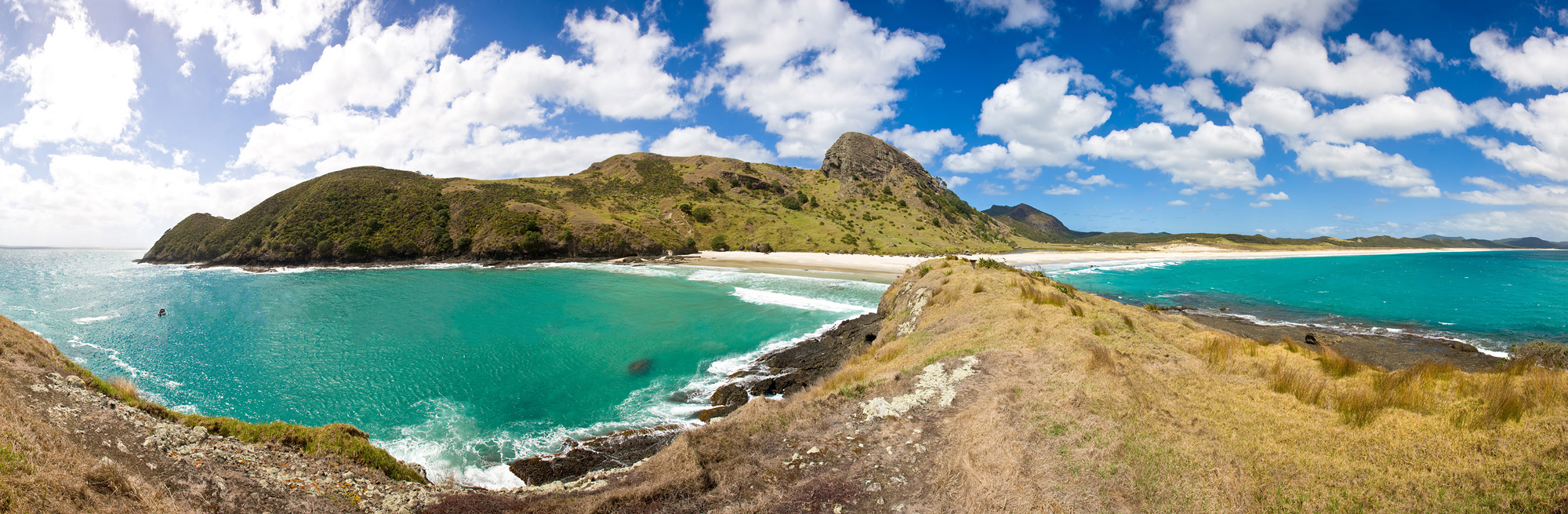
Spirits Bay is considered a sacred place in Māori belief.

Spirits Bay, believed to be one of the most haunted spots in New Zealand and a famous spot for supernatural beings, is considered a sacred place in Māori culture because according to legend, spirits of the dead depart to their ancestral home (Hawaiki) from a pōhutukawa tree at the tip of Cape Reinga. Upon reaching the tree, the spirits travel down a root to the sea below before uniting with their ancestors.

== Hilltop and forest spirits ==
In Māori traditional folklore, there were fairy folk and forest spirits. For instance, Maero is an evil fairy inhabiting forests in the South Island of New Zealand. Patupaiarehe are hilltop-living spiritual or otherworldly beings resembling humans in appearance. Turehu are pale-skinned ghostly people living in woodland areas.
