= Peter Gossage =

New Zealand author and illustrator

- Born: 22 October 1946; Remuera, Auckland
- Died: 30 July 2016 (aged 69)
- Citizenship: New Zealand
- Occupations: Writer, illustrator
- Spouse: Josephine (Tilly) Gossage
- Children: Marama, Ra, Tahu, Aroha and Star Gossage
- Writing career
- Language: English
- Years active: 1974–2016
- Genre: Fiction books
- Subject: Māori mythology
- Notable work: How Māui Slowed the Sun
- Notable awards: Storylines Gaelyn Gordon Award for a Much-Loved Book for How Maui Slowed the Sun

Peter Gossage (22 October 1946 – 30 July 2016) was a New Zealand author and illustrator. Known for his children's picture books based on Māori mythology, Gossage published over 20 books with deceptively simple storytelling popular inside and outside of classrooms. He is best known for his book How Māui Slowed the Sun. He worked on travelling displays outside of his books and also worked in television as a graphic and scenic artist on the TV2 show Happen Inn.

RNZ called Gossage "An author and illustrator responsible for helping popularise Māori tales in schools and homes."

== Early childhood ==
Peter Gossage was born in Remuera, Auckland, on 22 October 1946. As a child he was always interested in art, spent most of his leisure time building rafts down in Hobson Bay play fighting and mimicking military scenes. At school, Gossage despised maths. His nickname amongst his friends was Mekon, a reference from the Eagle comic of the 1950s and its antagonist, the Mighty Mekon. He recalled in an interview: "My mates called me Mekon because I had a broad general knowledge, academically, and we all got the Eagle." Gossage was born to a piano tuner father and artist mother. His mother Rita and sister Nola were both graduates of Auckland University's Elam School of Fine Arts.

== Early career ==
Gossage's first job after graduating from school was at an advertisement agency where he drew motifs for programmes. In 1964, Gossage traveled to Canada to study silk screening before returning home to work as a scenic artist and graphic designer at TV2.

We used to do television programme summary captions, a graphic on a bit of cardboard, twelve inches by nine inches, to show what programmes were on that night. I'd try to have a good range of styles and illustrations. We used a lot of Māori graphics.

Gossage would work in this role for the next 10 years before catching the eye of publisher, Charles Strachan, who suggested Gossage try creating a picture book. This suggestion was the birth of the New Zealand favourite, How Māui Found His Mother, published by Lansdowne in 1975. Gossage would release five more titles by 1985.

In March 1980, Gossage began working at the Auckland War Memorial Museum as a display artist. In 1987, he would channel his inner child, who loved to play with model soldiers and make war dioramas, to illustrate Kathryn Rountree's New Zealand Warriors series.

== Writing career ==
Gossage's first book published in 1975 was How Māui Found His Mother. The character, Māui, would appear in many more books of his and would be remembered as a quick-witted, mischievous trickster. Alongside his writing, Gossage is renowned for his very distinctive illustration style which drew children in and kept them enamored at each turn of a page. His books were published under the Penguin Random House New Zealand with 12 being successfully published and 10 still in print, 8 of which were put together to be published in a hardback edition. The first official copy of this edition arrived just after Gossage's death. His legacy lives on even after his death, as many New Zealanders remember him as a trailblazer in the 70s, when very few picture books were successful in communities. He was one of the first to try to tackle the unique brief locals were after but did so wonderfully. John Huria, senior editor at the New Zealand Council for Educational Research said Gossage's books were:

...a gateway for many children "to the Māori visual interpretation of the stories of Aotearoa."

Gossage died on 30/07/2016. His books sold tens of thousands of copies around New Zealand, continuing to sell well now even after his passing. Gossage's audience is not limited to a certain age or group of people, as they continue to be popular choices for teachers, tourists, children and everyone inbetween.

=== Criticism ===
Gossage mentioned in an interview with a New Zealand blogger that he had never really garnered any massive criticism for his books or his retellings of Māori mythology; however, on one occasion he approached Selwyn Muru from TV2 and asked, “Can you give us any advice?” to which Selwyn then replied with, “Why don't you Pakeha leave our culture alone?” He was not a fan of a Pakeha's entire catalogue being based on Māori culture.

== Personal life ==
Gossage was married to Josephine, known as Tilly to her friends and family. They met in an Auckland Hospital ward where they were being treated for mental health issues and were married in a 1971 Ratana wedding in St Mary's Bay where they wore purple, honouring each other's spirits.

Gossage had five children: Marama, Ra, Tahu, Aroha and Star Gossage. Josephine was from Pakiri. The pair were known as an eccentric couple. In a 2002 interview, Gossage was asked, "If you weren't a writer, what would you like to be?", to which he answered: "A demi-god. A happy husband."

== Publications ==
- 1975 – How Māui Found His Father and the Magic Jawbone, 36pp., ISBN 1869485785
- 1981 – The Fish of Māui, 32pp., ISBN 1869431340
- 1982 – How Māui Slowed the Sun, 36pp., ISBN 1869485734
- 1984 – How Māui Found the Secret of Fire, 35pp., ISBN 0143503790
- 1985 – How Māui defied the Goddess of Death, 36pp., ISBN 1869485742
- 1985 – The Black Knight, 32pp., ISBN 0864811101
- 1992 – Tahu, Ra and the Taniwha, 32pp., ISBN 1869480635
- 2001 – In the Beginning/I Te Timatanga, 32pp., ISBN 1869436121
- 2003 – Pania of the Reef, 32pp., ISBN 0143503553
- 2004 – Puhi-Huia and Pong, 40pp., ISBN 1869485025
- 2005 – Battle of Mountains, 32pp., ISBN 0143505637
- 2007 – Rona and the Moon, ISBN 1869780337
- 2012 – The Giant of Lake Wakatipu, 32pp., ISBN 0143505602
- 2016 – Māui and other Māori Legends, 208pp., ISBN 0143309293

== See also ==
- New Zealand literature
