= Hinauri =

Sister of Māui in Māori mythology

In Māori mythology, Hinauri is the sister of Māui and the wife of Irawaru. Māui becomes annoyed with Irawaru and stretches out his limbs, turning him into a dog. When Hinauri asks Māui if he has seen her husband, Māui tells her to call "Moi! Moi!" whereupon the poor dog runs up, and Hinauri, learning the truth, throws herself into the sea.

After drifting, Hinauri comes ashore at Wairarawa, where she is found by the brothers Ihuatamai and Ihuwareware. They restore her to health and take her as a wife, and Hinauri conceives a child by Ihuatamai. Ihuwareware tells the superior chief Tinirau of what has happened, and Tinirau takes Hinauri as a wife to live with him on Motutapu. There Hinauri is treated poorly by Tinirau's other wives, who attempt to kill her, so she chants incantations which kill them. Her brother Māuimua, also known as Rupe, comes searching for her and finds her on the day she gives birth, whereupon he flies her and her baby up to heaven to live with Rehua.

== See also ==
- Tinirau and Kae
- Māui (Māori mythology)
- Irawaru
