= Whakatau =

- Gender: Male
- Region: New Zealand
- Ethnic group: Māori

Genealogy
- Parents: Tūwhakararo and Apakura, or Rātā and Tongarautawhiri, or Tūhuruhuru
- Siblings: Tūwhakararo

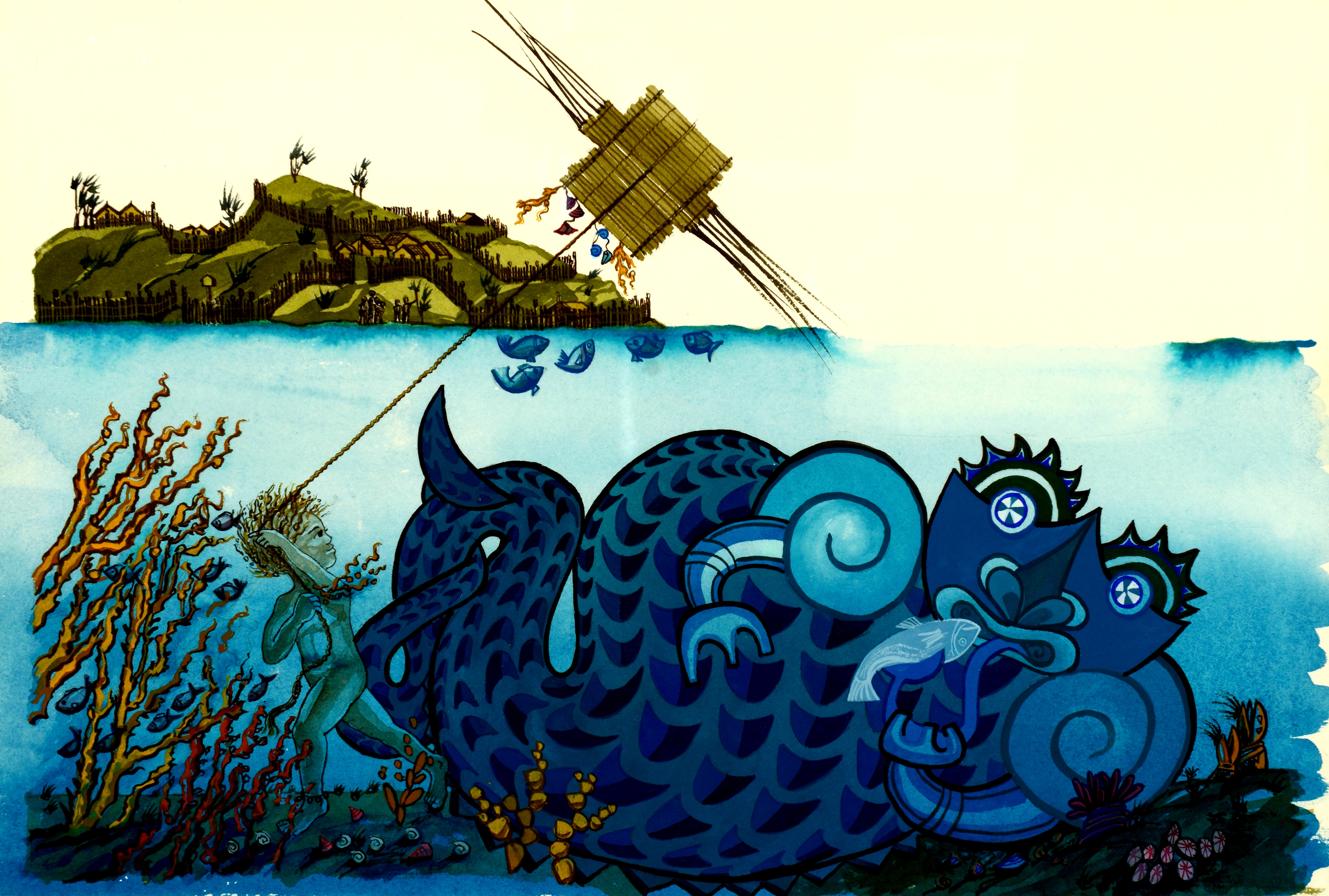
1988 depiction of Whakatau running along the seafloor flying his kite, under Rongotakawhiu's watch. The vague appearance of Papatūānuku can be seen as the island.

Whakatau (or Whakatau-pōtiki) was a supernatural person in Māori mythology.

One day Apakura threw her apron into the sea, and a sea atua named Rongotakawhiu took it and worked it into human form, and Whakatau was born. The atua taught him the arts of enchantment. As the child grew older, people saw kites flying at sea, but could not see who held the strings. Whakatau loved to fly kites, and would run along the floor of the ocean with his toy. One day, he came ashore and the people tried to catch him. Whakatau was too fast a runner and would let no one catch him except his mother Apakura. He then lived on land with her, and grew up into a famous hero.

In another account, Tūwhakararo was murdered by the men of the Ati Hapai tribe, and Whakatau set out on a quest to rescue the bones of his father, and to avenge his death. He assembled an army, and prepared his war canoes Whiritoa, Tapatapa-hukarere, Hakirere, Toroa-i-taipakihi, Mahunu-awatea, and others. The expedition set off, and Whakatau, with his best men, besieged a wharenui called Te Uru-o-Manono where the enemy were gathered. The house was burned and the people of Ati Hapai were wiped out.

In some accounts, Whakatau was a son of Tūhuruhuru (son of Hinauri), and a nephew of Tūwhakararo.
