= Makeatutara =

Father of Māui in Māori mythology

In Māori mythology, Makeatutara is the father of Māui. His wife is Taranga. He is a deity and guardian of the underworld. Makeatutara made mistakes as he recited the dedicatory (or baptismal) incantations over Māui, which made it inevitable that Māui would die. As a result, humankind is mortal.
