= Rātā (Māori mythology) =

Māori legend

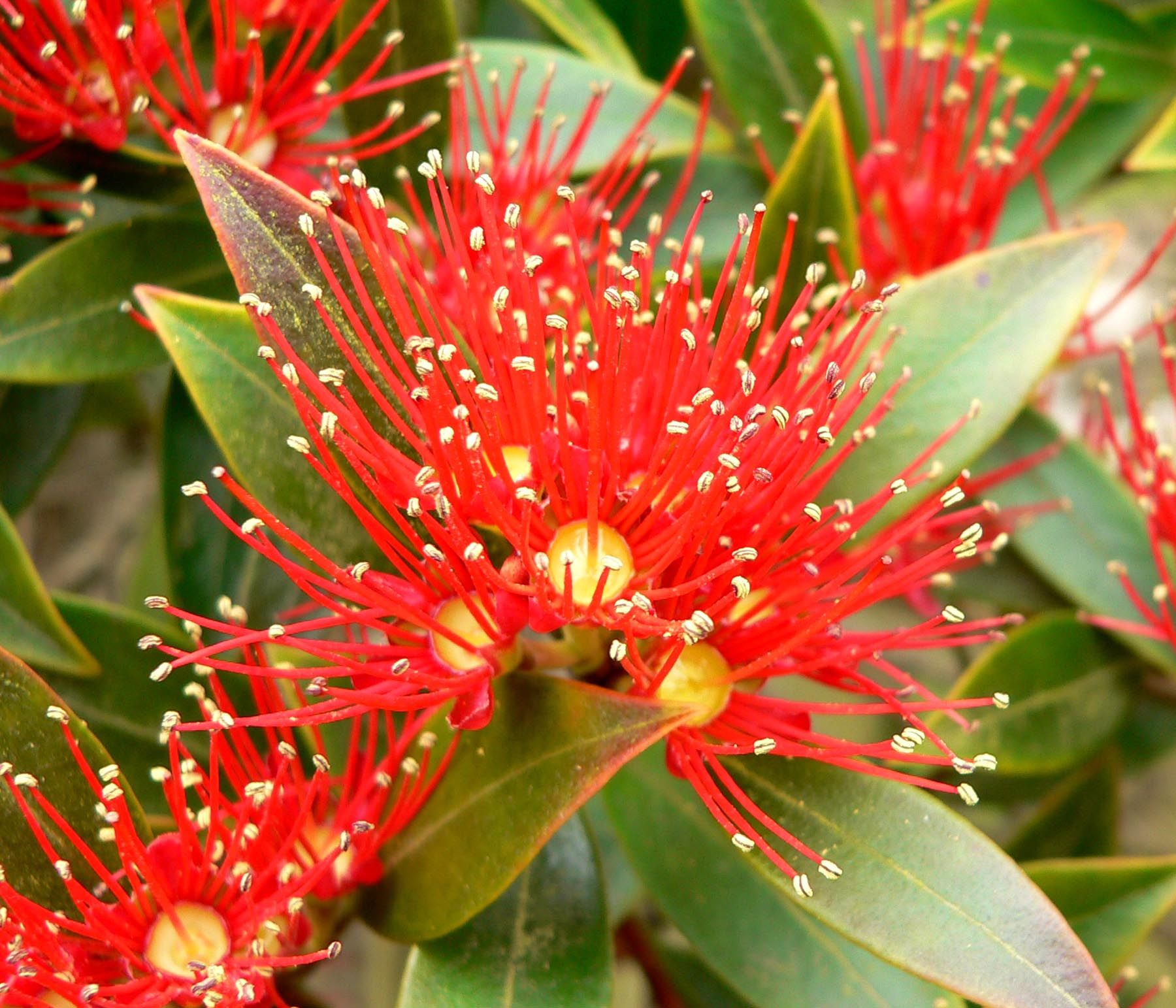
Rātā gave the flowers of the rātā tree their colour

In Māori mythology, accounts vary somewhat as to the ancestry of Rātā. Usually he is a grandson of Tāwhaki and son of Wahieroa. Wahieroa is treacherously killed by Matuku-tangotango, an ogre. Rātā sets out to avenge the murder, travelling to the home of Matuku, where a servant of the ogre tells him that Matuku comes out to devour people each new moon, and that he can be killed at the pool where he washes his face and hair. Rātā waits till the ogre comes out and is leaning over with his head in the pool. He grabs him by the hair and kills him. Matuku's bones are used to make spears for hunting birds.

Rātā searches for his father's bones so that he can afford them the proper respect. He learns that the Ponaturi have the bones in their village. He must build a canoe to get there. He goes into the forest, and fells a tree, and cuts off the top. His day's work over, he goes home, and returns the next morning. To his surprise he finds the tree standing upright and whole. Once again he cuts it down, but when he returns he finds the tree standing again. He hides in the forest, and hears the voices of the multitude of the hākuturi (forest spirits, called rorotini in one account), who set to work to re-erect the tree, putting each chip into its proper place. He runs out and catches some of the hakuturi, who tell him they re-erected the tree because he insulted Tāne, the god of the forest, by not performing the correct rituals before felling the tree. Rātā is ashamed, and expresses regret. Then the hākuturi make him a canoe, naming it Niwaru (alias Niwareka, Āniwaniwa, etc.)(Biggs 1966:450).

Rātā and his people launch the canoe and paddle off to find the Ponaturi. Arriving, Rātā cleverly surrounds them, kills their priests, and rescues his father's bones. The Ponaturi regroup and give chase. The battle goes badly until Rātā recites an incantation called Titikura that he overheard their priests recite while they were tapping together the bones of Wahieroa. In a flash all Rātā's dead warriors return to life and attack and slaughter all of the Ponaturi. Rātā is the father of Tūwhakararo, who is the father of Whakatau.

== See also ==
- Rata (Tuamotu mythology)
- Rata (Tahitian mythology)
- Laka (Hawaiian and other Polynesian mythology)
