= Taranga (Māori mythology) =

Mother of the Māori demigod Māui

- Māori mythology character

In-universe information
- Spouse: Makeatutara
- Children: Maui-taha; Maui-roto; Maui-pae; Maui-waho; Māui

In Polynesian mythology, Taranga is the mother of Māui. She had five children total, the other four were Maui-taha, Maui-roto, Maui-pae, and Maui-waho, with Māui being her fifth and final child. Her husband is Makeatutara. Māui was born prematurely, so Taranga wrapped his body in her hair and threw him into the waves. Some sea-creatures cared for him, hiding him in kelp until a storm sent him back to the beach. Māui was surrounded by swarms of flies, but his ancestor, Tamanui-ki-te-rangi, found him, brought him back to life, and educated him.

Māui arrived at his mother's village one day, and recognized his brothers. Taranga didn't know who he was until Māui reminded her of the circumstances of his birth. She then gave him the name Maui-tikitiki-a-Taranga (Maui-formed-in-the-top-knot-of-Taranga) and allowed the young Maui to sleep in her bed. Each morning, Taranga would disappear and eventually Māui followed her to the underworld by assuming the shape of a wood pigeon. Māui found her with his father, Makeatutara, a guardian of the underworld. Taranga introduced them and his father performed the dedicatory ritual over his son. Because Makeatutara made mistakes in the incantation, Māui was fated to die and thus humankind is mortal.

In some versions, Taranga is a man, the son of Murirangawhenua. He married Irawhaki, and begat the Māui brothers.
