= Fati (name) =

Fati may refer to the following people:

Given name

- Fati Abubakar, Nigerian photojournalist
- Fati Jamali (born 1988), Moroccan actress and TV presenter
- Fati Lami Abubakar (born 1951), former First Lady of Nigeria
- Fati Mariko (born 1964), Nigerien singer
- Fati Mohammed (born 1979), Ghanaian football goalkeeper

Middle name

- José Fati Tepano, Easter Island judge
- Sharif Fati Ali Al Mishad (born 1976), Egyptian prisoner in the United States

Surname

- Ansu Fati (born 2002), Spanish footballer
  - Braima Fati, his older brother
  - Miguel Fati, his brother
- Ença Fati (born 1993), Bissau-Guinean footballer

== See also ==
- Fathi
- Fathy
- Fethi
