= Tahiti and Society Islands mythology =

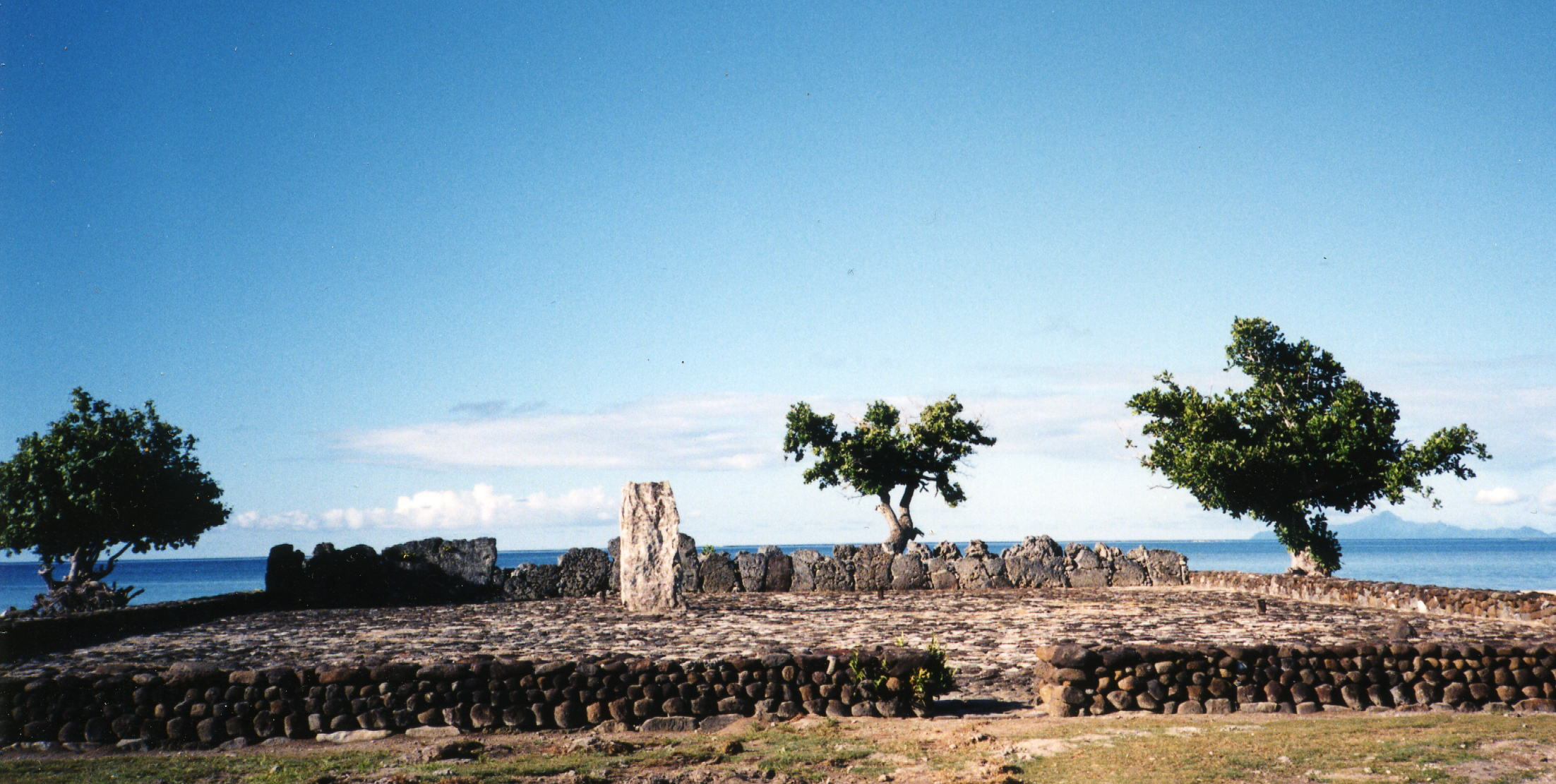
Taputapuātea, an ancient marae constructed of stone on Raʻiātea in the Society Islands.

Tahiti and Society Islands mythology comprises the legends, historical tales, and sayings of the ancient people of the Society Islands, consisting of Tahiti, Bora Bora, Raʻiātea, Huahine, Moʼorea and other islands. It is considered a variant of a more general Polynesian mythology, developing its own unique character for several centuries. The religion was officially suppressed in the 19th century, and ultimately abandoned by the natives in favor of Christianity.

== Prominent figures and terms in Tahiti and Society Islands mythology ==
- Fati
- Ro'o-i-Te-Hiripoi
- Ta'aroa
- Taonoui
- Tumu-nui
- Māui (Tahitian mythology)
- Roua
- Rata (Tahitian mythology)
- Pahuanui
- Pua Tu Tahi
- Aremata-Popoa and Aremata-Rorua
- 'Oro

== See also ==
- Polynesian mythology
- Ghosts in Polynesian culture
