= Vahieroa =

Vahieroa may refer to:

- Vahieroa (Tahitian mythology)
- Vahieroa (Tuamotu mythology)

== See also ==
- Wahieloa
