= Rata (name) =

Rata is a Polynesian name, which is reflected in the Māori, Tahitian and Tuamotu mythology. Also an alternate spelling for Ratha (راثا) an Arabic word or a name given.

Given names

- Rata Harrison (1935–2013), New Zealand rugby league player
- Rata Lovell-Smith (1894–1969), New Zealand artist

Surname

- Matiu Rata (1934–1997), New Zealand politician
- Te Rata (1877–1933), Māori king

== See also ==
- Rață, a Moldovan surname
- Rataj
- Ratha, an Arabic name
