= Fati =

Fati may refer to

- Fati (god), the god of the moon in Polynesian mythology
- Fati (name)
- Fati Municipality in Libya
- Amor Fati (disambiguation), multiple articles related to a philosophical concept
