= Fathi =

Arabic given name and surname

- Pronunciation: Arabic: [faːt.ħiː]
- Gender: Unisex
- Language: Arabic

Origin
- Origin: Arabic
- Region of origin: Arab world

Other names
- Alternative spelling: fethi
- Variant forms: Fetih (Turkish), Fathiu (Nigeria)
- Nickname: none
- Related names: Mansur, Nasr, Nasir

Fathi (Arabic: فَتْحِي fat·ḥiy/ fat·ḥī/ fat·ḥy) is an Arabic given name and surname in the possessive form which means "victorious, triumphant". It may refer to:

== People ==
=== Given name ===
- Fathi Abdel Rahman (born 1932), Egyptian boxer
- Fathi Aboud (born 1964), Libyan triple jumper
- Fathi Tawfiq Abdulrahim (died 2013), Yemeni politician and businessman
- Fathi Ahmed (born 1991), Finnish–Somali actor and comedian
- Fathi Ali (born 1940), Egyptian tennis player
- Fathi Arafat (1933–2004), Palestinian physician and chairman of the Palestine Red Crescent Society
- Fathi Baja, Libyan academic
- Fathi Bashagha (born 1962), Libyan politician
- Fathi Chebel (born 1956), French-Algerian footballer
- Fathi Derder (1970–2025), Swiss politician
- Fathi Eljahmi (1941–2009), Libyan imprisoned dissident
- Fathi Ghaben (1947–2024), Palestinian artist and educator
- Fathi Hamad (born 1961), Palestinian politician
- Fathi Hassan (born 1957), Egyptian sculptor and artist
- Fathi Al-Jabal (born 1963), Tunisian football manager
- Fathi Jabir (born 1980), Yemeni footballer
- Fathi Jamal (born 1959), Moroccan football coach
- Fathi Kameel (1955–2026), Kuwaiti footballer
- Fathi Al-Khoga (born 1984), Libyan futsal player
- Fathi Khorshid (1937–2018), Egyptian footballer
- Fathi Omar El-Kikhia (1901–1958), Libyan lawyer, politician, and diplomat
- Fathi Safwat Kirdar (1896–1966), Iraqi painter and sculptor
- Fathi Mabrouk (born 1951), Egyptian footballer
- Fathi Al-Majbari, Libyan politician
- Fathi Nasri (born 1958), Tunisian writer, poet, and scholar
- Fathi Osman (1928–2010), Egyptian author and scholar
- Fathi Razem (1949–2017), Palestinian politician
- Fathi Saleh (born 1939), Egyptian computer engineer
- Fathi Shaqaqi (1951–1995), Palestinian physician and politician
- Ahmad Fathi Sorour (1932–2024), speaker of the Egyptian People's Assembly
- Fathi Terbil (born 1972), Libyan lawyer and human rights activist
- Fathi Uraybi (1942–2015), Libyan freelance writer and artist
- Fathi Yakan (1933–2009), Lebanese Islamic cleric

=== Surname ===
- Ahmed Fathi (born 1957), Yemeni musician, composer and singer
- Albert Fathi (born 1951), Egyptian-French mathematician

== Fictional character ==
- Fatĥi, in Malatily Bathhouse

== See also ==
- Fathy
- faith
- Fethi
