= Switcher (disambiguation) =

Switcher may refer to:

- Switcher locomotive, a locomotive used in yards
- Video switcher, a vision mixer
- Switchers Trilogy, compilation of stories by Kate Thompson
  - Switchers (novel), by Kate Thompson
- Serial switcher, a person who continually moves his/her consumption from one company to another
- Switcha, a Bahamian cuisine beverage

== Technology ==
- Application switcher, a keyboard shortcut
- Shift Switcher, a Compiz Fusion plugin
- Switcher (computer program), for Apple Mac
- Network switch, a computer networking device that connects network segments
- Switched-mode power supply, a power supply that regulates its output using a switching regulator
