= Code (web series) =

Moroccan action web series

#Code
- Genre: Action, Mystery
- Created by: Anouar Moatassim
- Developed by: Anouar Moatassim; Zakaria Kassi Lahlou; Zineb Roachedi
- Written by: Anouar Moatassim
- Directed by: Anouar Moatassim
- Composer: Reda Tajmoute
- Country of origin: Morocco
- Original language: Moroccan Arabic
- No. of seasons: 1
- No. of episodes: 12

Production
- Executive producers: Dino Sebti; Driss Ennaji
- Producer: Inwi
- Production location: Casablanca
- Running time: 5-9 minutes
- Production company: SIGMA

Original release
- Network: YouTube
- Release: June 6 – July 2, 2016

#Code is a Moroccan action web series created by Inwi that premiered on June 1, 2016 on their YouTube channel. It is meant as a promotional content for the mobile operator, and was the second effort at making a web series after a 2-seasons web series called Switchers.

The series was distributed through Inwi social accounts in Facebook and YouTube.

== Plot ==
Karim, an engineer in a company, was about to reveal information about his employers evildoings, when he is caught up in a traffic accident leading to his death. But Karim has not disappeared yet and has one chance to complete the mission he started.

== Main cast and characters ==
- Youssef Ben Hayoun Sadafi as Karim
- Ghita Lahmamsi as Sofia
- Youssef La Gazouille as El Wafi
- Hamid El Hadri as Driss
- Youssef Benzakour as Imad
- Jalilo Essaidi as Fouad
- Alex Bego as Igor
- Fati Jamali as Imane
- Ahmed Aznague as Police chef
- Rachida Manar as Mother of Sofia
- Hamid Ezzouek as Father of Sofia
- Hamza Idrissi as Doctor
- Maha El Boukhari as Sarah

== Episodes ==
The web series was scheduled to run during the month of Ramadan, the YouTube views were updated as of 9 July 2016:

| No. | Original airdate | Duration | Viewers (YouTube) |
|---|---|---|---|
| 1 | 6 June 2016 | 5min45s | 1.5 million |
| 2 | 8 June 2016 | 9min33s | 0.9 million |
| 3 | 11 June 2016 | 9min38s | 0.7 million |
| 4 | 13 June 2016 | 6min41s | 0.7 million |
| 5 | 15 June 2016 | 6min59s | 0.6 million |
| 6 | 18 June 2016 | 7min14s | 0.4 million |
| 7 | 20 June 2016 | 6min14s | 0.7 million |
| 8 | 22 June 2016 | 6min16s | 0.4 million |
| 9 | 25 June 2016 | 7min04s | 0.2 million |
| 10 | 27 June 2016 | 7min53s | 0.3 million |
| 11 | 29 June 2016 | 6min32s | 0.2 million |
| 12 | 2 July 2016 | 6min22s | 0.3 million |

== Production ==
Inwi first effort at making a web series was a similar concept called Switchers, which ran for 2 seasons.

#Code was shot in several places around Casablanca in the course of 2 weeks.

== Marketing ==
The series uses extensive references to Inwi's mobile and Internet offers, in addition to services like "Beddel Sawtek", "Semme3ni" and their mobile game "z7am".

Inwi also partnered with phone manufacturer Samsung, radio station Hit Radio, and production company SIGMA.

In episode 4, Karim is seen playing "Z7am" a traffic runner mobile game that was released by The Wall Games in partnership with Inwi.
