= Midnight's Choice =

Fantasy novel by Kate Thompson

- First edition
- Author: Kate Thompson
- Cover artist: Darren Lock
- Language: English
- Series: Switchers Trilogy
- Genre: Fantasy
- Publisher: The Bodley Head
- Publication date: 1998
- Publication place: Ireland
- Pages: 167 pp
- ISBN: 0-370-32495-1
- Preceded by: Switchers
- Followed by: Wild Blood

Midnight's Choice is a fantasy novel for young adults, by Kate Thompson. It is the second book in the Switchers Trilogy, and continues the story of Tess and Kevin, two young Irish shapeshifters (or Switchers, as they are called in the novel). It also introduces the character of Martin, another Switcher, who is the book's main antagonist.

The audiobook narrated by Niamh Cusack was released in 2001.

== Plot ==
=== Setting ===
Midnight's Choice is set in the city of Dublin, in Ireland. The events of the book take place "a few days after New Year", although exactly which year is uncertain.

=== Plot introduction ===
Tess faces a terrible choice between the eternal purity of a phoenix's existence, and the darkness that is the unlife of a vampire.

=== Plot summary ===
In the form of a phoenix, Tess flies out of her room to join Kevin, who is now permanently in the shape of such a magical bird. She tries to ask Kevin what has happened to him since they last spoke, but her mind is overwhelmed by the purity and beauty of the phoenix's nature, and she instantly loses interest in asking questions. The following night, she becomes worried about the restless behaviour of her pet rat Algernon, and her animal-mind detects a telepathic summons being sent to all the rats in the city. Algernon breaks out of his cage and escapes into the sewers, and as a rat Tess follows him to an empty house filled with thousands of his kind. There, she discovers that the source of the mysterious call is a male Switcher. The next day, Tess investigates the house, and sees a red haired boy standing in the doorway of a house across the street. Somehow sensing that he is the Switcher, she resolves to speak to him when she gets the chance.

Upon reading a newspaper article, Tess discovers that the phoenix has been captured in the Phoenix Park, and is now on display in Dublin Zoo. Therefore, she sets off to visit the Switcher and ask for help in breaking her friend out of confinement. Tess finds the boy (Martin) sleeping in the darkness of his room, and tells him that she knows he is a Switcher. Martin agrees to help her, but only on the condition that she return to his house that night so that he can demonstrate his skill as a Switcher to her. When she does return, he takes her for a walk through the streets, and then demonstrates the truly awesome and horrible skill which he has learned by Switching into a vampire. Martin feeds on her blood, the shock of which stimulates Tess' survival instincts, and she Switches into the only form in which she will be safe from Martin: a vampire. Once she is in this form, all of Tess' revulsion toward the concept of vampirism vanishes, but Martin warns her not to kill her victim when she feeds, as doing so would arouse suspicion. After much hunting, the two come upon a young couple in a car, on whose blood they feed.

For the next few days, Tess behaves scornfully toward her parents, upsetting them greatly. At last when her mother mentions the phoenix, the memory of her time as one of those glorious, pure bird dispels the lingering aspects of the vampire personality, and she apologises for her behaviour. The family visit the zoo to see the bird, and there Tess meets Lizzie, who claims to be worried about something. The old woman informs her that the phoenix is a powerful force of good, and will change many lives, but according to the nature of the world, some dark force must have come into existence to balance out the presence of the phoenix. Upon entering the building in which the bird is caged, Tess is suddenly overcome by a feeling of joy and warmth, and realises that the bird is having this effect on everyone who sees it. Outside, she and her parents enjoy a game of Frisbee, all their arguments forgotten, not even becoming upset when Tess accidentally loses the Frisbee in the bushes. However, Lizzie tells Tess that she has "work to do", and is wasting time.

Tess visits Martin again, and he explains to her the gruesome circumstances of his father's death. She is horrified, but he seems not to care. He takes her into the crypt which he plans to make his home, and she realises that he has been using the rats to excavate this crypt. She tells him that she never wants to return to being a vampire, but Martin claims that now he has bitten her, she will become one of the undead as soon as she dies. He tells her that his fifteenth birthday is the following day, and, because he intends to remain a vampire, he offers her the chance to join him willingly. She refuses, claiming that if she chooses to become an immortal phoenix, she will never succumb to death or vampirism. So as to destroy Tess' confidence, Martin sends the city's rats to kill Kevin at the zoo, but the phoenix escapes with Tess's help. He and Martin confront each other in the park, and Tess steps between them, where she is confronted with the choice between becoming like either of them. Martin uses his hypnotic powers to coerce her, and in turn Kevin uses his purifying powers to draw her toward him. Tess alternates between allegiances and the struggle within her becomes so strong that it begins to damage her mind. As she tries desperately to choose her path, Tess suddenly remembers some prior advice given by Lizzie, and realises what she is doing wrong: She has been convinced that she must choose to be either a vampire or a phoenix, when in fact, the option of simply remaining human was never closed to her. Tess chooses to retain her humanity, and this somehow transforms both Martin and Kevin back into their human forms. Martin, his defences lowered, breaks down over the loss of his father, but when Tess tries to comfort him, he realises he is vulnerable and runs off into the trees. Tess follows, but slips on the Frisbee which she lost earlier.

Tess enters Martin's home in the form of a cat, and but doesn't see Martin there. She checks on Martin's mother, on whom Tess has realised that Martin had been feeding for a while before she met him. However it seems that his mother is still alive, though exhausted. Tess takes Kevin back to her home, where they discuss the events of the past few days. Kevin claims that because he and Martin balanced each other out, Martin's return to humanity meant that Kevin too lost his supernatural form. Their discussion is interrupted by the arrival of Algernon, who informs them that Martin has disappeared, and that his control over the rats of the city is broken. Tess and Kevin realise that Martin has chosen to remain human, and decide to help him through his newly exposed grief.

== Major characters ==
- Tess: The principal protagonist of the series. Tess is a Switcher, and is fourteen at the time of this book.
- Kevin: Formerly a Switcher, Kevin has passed his fifteenth birthday by the time of this book, and therefore no longer possesses the ability to change his shape. At the end of Switchers, Kevin chose to take on the form of a phoenix for the rest of his life. He spends most of Midnight's Choice in this form, but reverts to being human at the end of the story.
- Martin: The book's principal antagonist. Martin is a handsome, red-haired boy, and is only a few days away from his fifteenth birthday at the time of Midnight's Choice. After the death of his father, Martin began to transform himself into a vampire so as to avoid dealing with the pain of this loss.
- Elizabeth "Lizzie" Larten: An elderly former Switcher. In this book, she warns Tess that something evil (i.e. Martin's vampire self) has entered the city.

== Major themes ==
The principal theme of Midnight's Choice (as with all the books of the Switchers Trilogy) is the idea of 'coming of age', and the possibilities which teenagers face in the world as they grow up. In particular, this book explores the eternal struggle of good and evil, as well as the choice between the two which is faced by humans. The two supernatural creatures which appear as rivals in Midnight's Choice are drawn from two widely known, folkloric myths: That of the phoenix and that of the vampire. In the novel, these two characters are incarnations of good and evil respectively, and each advocates an alluring yet partly unfulfilling lifestyle. The vampire offers an eternal life of dark power and security from grief within the cold persona of the hunter, but which bars its subject from love or closeness. The phoenix, by contrast, offers a different kind of immortality, one of perfect, benevolent serenity and kindness, but one which also creates a certain level of detachment.

== Significance within the series ==
This is the only book of the Switchers Trilogy which takes place entirely in Dublin. Switchers begins in the city, but the important parts of the story occur mostly in the Arctic circle. The majority of Wild Blood is set in rural County Clare.

Near the end of the book, Tess' father is addressed as "Seamus", the first and only time in the series at which either of Tess' parents is referenced by name.

== Publication history ==
This book was first published in Great Britain in 1998, by The Bodley Head.
