= Piripiri (disambiguation) =

Piripiri, or piri piri, is a Capiscum cultivar.

Piripiri may also refer to:

== Places ==
- Piripiri, Piauí, Brazil
- Piripiri, Manawatū-Whanganui, New Zealand
- Piripiri Caves and Piri Piri School, in Waitomo District, New Zealand

== Plants ==
- Acaena (Māori: piripiri), a plant genus of the Southern Hemisphere
- Cyperus giganteus, a plant of Latin America

== See also ==
- Hinepiripiri, a figure in Māori mythology
