= Matoka-rau-tāwhiri =

In Māori mythology (South Island), Matoka-rau-tāwhiri is a wife of Wahieroa, and mother of Rātā.

When Matoka-rau-tawhiri was pregnant, she had a craving to eat the flesh of a tūī bird, and asked Wahieroa to catch one. Wahieroa did so. It was cooked and she ate it with relish. Some time later she asked him to bring her another. Wahieroa went into the forest with his slave, but could not find any tūī. The two men went further and further into the forest, until they came to the hunting grounds of Matuku-tangotango, who killed Wahieroa and captured his slave. Shortly after Wahieroa had been killed, Matoka-rau-tawhiri gave birth to a son, named Rātā (Reed 1963:178).

== See also ==
- Tāwhaki
