= Tahiti-tokerau =

Water-nymph in the mythology of the Tuamotu Islands, French Polynesia

In the Tuamotu Rata cycle, Tahiti-tokerau was a water-nymph whom Vahi-vero marries. She was abducted by Puna, king of the underworld and rescued by her husband. They then become parents of Rata.

== See also ==
- Rata (Tuamotu mythology)
- Rātā (Māori mythology)
- Laka (Hawaiian and other Polynesian mythology)
