= Secret Story (African TV series) =

French-language African reality television show

- Secret Story Afrique
- Genre: Reality television
- Based on: Secret Story
- Presented by: Jean-Michel Onnin; Stéphanelle
- Voices of: Keiffren Bondobari (as La Voix)
- Opening theme: I Wanna Chat (version 2024) by Booty Full
- Country of origin: French-speaking Africa
- Original language: French
- No. of seasons: 2

Production
- Production locations: Johannesburg, South Africa

Original release
- Network: Canal+ Pop
- Release: 15 June 2024 – present

Secret Story Afrique (titled on-screen as Secret Story), is a French-language reality competition television show, based on the French television show Secret Story.

Like the original version, although the show is not directly inspired from Big Brother created by producer John de Mol Jr. in 1999, it does have a similar concept while including his own game mechanics and is also produced and owned by Big Brother's production company Endemol Shine Group.

The show follows a group of contestants from all over African French who live together, isolated from the outside world in a house called Maison des Secrets (House of Secrets), fitted with cameras and microphones in each room.

Each week, a contestant is voted out by the spectators. They also have a secret that they must keep, while also discovering that of the others.

== Season 1 ==
The show's first season aired on Canal+ Pop from 15 June 2024 to 10 August 2024. The hosts were Jean-Michel Onnin and Stéphanelle, with Gabonese actor Keiffren Bondobari as la Voix. There was also a Live 24/7 available on a separate television channel.
Awa Sanoko from Côte d'Ivoire won this season on Day 56.
The season was filmed in Johannesburg, South Africa, in the same house Big Brother Mzansi season 4 was filmed in, earlier the same year.

=== Housemates ===
Every Housemate entered the House on Day 0.

==== Ak-Rame ====
Ak-Rame Adechokan is a 27-year-old model from Benin. He lives in Cotonou, where he also works as a digital marketing strategist. He was evicted on Day 49.
Secret: "I am the guardian of the Treasure." : on Day 1, Ak-Rame has been given a key that symbolises his personal jackpot. He must hide that key every day in a different spot of the house, to keep it away from the hunter of the Treasure (namely Tobias, unbeknownst to Ak-Rame).

==== Ange ====
Ange Patrick Koffi is a 28-year-old model from Côte d'Ivoire. He reached the final and ended up at the fourth place on Day 56.
Secret: "We are a fake couple." : Ange shares his secret with Bernika, whom he met at the moment of entering the House. The two housemates then entered the House pretending to be in a relationship.

==== Awa ====
Awa Sanoko is a 29-year-old model from Côte d'Ivoire. She won the final on Day 56.
Secret: "I am one of the world's most beautiful models." : Awa has been elected Miss Model of the World in 2015.

==== Bériche ====
Bériche is 32 years old, and lives in the Republic of the Congo. She was evicted on Day 35.
Secret: "I am a sleepwalker."

==== Bernika ====
Bernika "Nika" Bonane is a DJ from Burkina Faso. She was fake evicted on Day 35, then spent a week in the Secret Room, and was eventually evicted on Day 49.
Secret: "We are a fake couple." : Bernika shares her secret with Ange, whom she met at the moment of entering the House. The two housemates then entered the House pretending to be in a relationship.

==== Emmanuel ====
Emmanuel Muma is a 45-year-old telecommunications engineer from Bamenda, Cameroon. He is the oldest Housemate of the season. He reached the final on Day 56, where he finished in third place.
Secret: "I am the only survivor of a plane crash." : Emmanuel survived the 2019 Busy Bee Congo Dornier 228 crash, in which the other 21 occupants of the plane died. Emmanuel is the only Housemate to reach the final with his secret undiscovered.

==== Grâce & Gloire ====
Grâce Charly & Gloire Yvan Dossou-Yovo are a two-in-one housemate. These identical twin brothers live in Benin and are 35 years old.
Secret: "We are twin brothers." : Gloire entered the House on his own on Day 0, while Grâce went to the Secret Room, where he followed his brother's adventure on a screen. The twins would swap places every few days, with Grâce entering the House and Gloire hiding in the Secret Room, and kept on doing so until their secret was discovered.

==== Kaaty ====
Kadiatou "Kaaty" Diallo is 28 years old and lves in Conakry, Guinea. She is a football enthusiast. Kaaty reached the final on Day 56, and ended up as the runner-up of the season.
Secret: "I have weighed up to 170 kilos."

==== Kitary ====
Mouhamed Kitary Harouna Coulibaly, professionally known as Kitary, is a 27-year-old singer from Niger. He was evicted on Day 21.
Secret: "I am the child of a nationwide famous singer." : Kitary's mother is Fati Mariko, a famous singer in Niger.

==== Ma & Mota ====
Marne Aïssatou "Ma" & Ndeye Mota Sembene, dubbed Ma & Mota, are a two-in-one Housemate. These 28-year-old identical twin sisters are from Senegal, and work as influencers. They were evicted on Day 28.
Secret: "We are twin sisters." : Mota entered the House on her own on Day 0, while Ma went to the Secret Room, where she followed her sister's adventure on a screen. The twins would swap places every few days, with Ma entering the House and Mota hiding in the Secret Room, and kept on doing so until their secret was discovered.

==== Maïmouna ====
Maïmouna Keita is a 27-year-old model from Mali, and is the incumbent Miss Mali. She reached the final on Day 56, and came fifth.
Secret: "I found out at the age of 18 that my aunt was my mother." : Maïmouna was adopted as an infant by her biological father's sister and never learned about it until she was 18.

==== Marlène ====
Marlène Kekely Gonçalves is a 30-year-old actress from Togo. She left the House on Day 2 due to health issues, and came back on Day 7. She was eventually evicted on Day 14.
Secret: "I survived a terrorist attack." : Marlène survived the Grand-Bassam shootings in 2016, while she was visiting the place and staying in a hotel.

==== Tobias ====
Tobias Rakotomanga is a 27-year-old professional swimmer and influencer who lives in Madagascar. He walked from the show on Day 7.
Secret: "I am the hunter of the Treasure." : Upon entering the House on Day 0, Tobias received the mission to look for the key to the treasure, that a guardian was hiding from him. The guardian in question was Ak-Rame, unbeknownst to Tobias.

==== Tracy ====
Tracy Camile Dja Djédjé is a 27-year-old interior designer from the Democratic Republic of the Congo. She was evicted on Day 42.
Secret: "I am a Wag." : A Wag refers to the wife or the girlfriend of a professional athlete. Tracy is the wife of Ivorian football player Brice Dja Djédjé.

==== Yann-Amir ====
Yann-Amir Ambiamawene, sometimes dubbed Amir by other Housemates, is 28 years old and comes from Gabon. He was evicted on Day 42.
Secret: "I can see the future."

=== Secrets ===
Name	Country	Age	Secret	Discovered by	Status
Awa Sanoko	Ivory Coast	29	"I am one of the world's most beautiful models."	Ak-Rame (Day 28)	Winner (Day 56)
Kaaty Diallo	Guinea	28	"I have weighed up to 170 kilos."	Ak-Rame (Day 35)	Runner-up (Day 56)
Emmanuel Muma	Cameroon	45	"I am the only survivor of a plane crash."	Undiscovered	Third place (Day 56)
Ange Koffi	Ivory Coast	28	"We are a fake couple." (with Bernika)	Kaaty (Day 3)	Fourth place (Day 56)
Maïmouna Keita	Mali	27	"I found out at the age of 18 that my aunt was my mother."	Awa (Day 46)	Fifth place (Day 56)
Bernika Bonane	Burkina Faso	26	"We are a fake couple." (with Ange)	Kaaty (Day 3)	Evicted (Day 49)
Ak-Rame Adechokan	Benon	27	"I am the guardian of the Treasure."	Kaaty (Day 35)	Evicted (Day 49)
Yann-Amir Ambiamawene	Gabon	29	"I can see the future."	Undiscovered	Evicted (Day 42)
Tracy Dja Djédjé	Democratic Republic of the Congo	27	"I am a Wag."	Kaaty (Day 21)	Evicted (Day 42)
Bériche	Republic of the Congo	32	"I am a sleepwalker."	Undiscovered	Evicted (Day 35)
Grâce & Gloire Dossou Yovo	Benin	35	"We are twin brothers."	Kitary (Day 14)	Evicted (Day 35)
Ma & Mota Sembene	Senegal	28	"We are twin sisters."	Awa (Day 9)	Evicted (Day 28)
Kitary Coulibaly	Niger	27	"I am the child of a nationwide famous singer."	Grâce (Day 14)	Evicted (Day 21)
Marlène Gonçalves	Togo	30	"I survived a terrorist attack."	Undiscovered	Evicted (Day 14)
Tobias Rakotomanga	Madagascar	27	"I am the hunter of the Treasure."	Undiscovered	Walked (Day 7)

=== Nominations table ===
	Week 1	Week 2	Week 3	Week 4	Week 5	Week 6	Week 7	Week 8	
Up for eviction	Bériche; Kaaty; Maïmouna	Bériche; Kaaty; Marlène	Kaaty; Kitary; Tracy	Ak-Rame; Bernika; Ma & Mota	Bériche; Bernika; Grâce & Gloire; Tracy	Ange; Awa; Tracy; Yann-Amir	Ak-Rame; Bernika; Kaaty	Ange; Awa; Emmanuel; Kaaty; Maïmouna	
Awa	Not nominated	Not nominated	Ma & Mota ?	Ak-Rame; Ma & Mota	Not nominated (4th place)	Nominated (3rd place)	Kaaty; Ak-Rame; Bernika	Winner (Day 56)	
Kaaty	Nominated	Nominated	Nominated	Emmanuel; Ma & Mota	Not nominated (2nd place)	Not nominated (2nd place)	Awa; Ange; Bernika	Runner-up (Day 56)	
Emmanuel	Kaaty; Bériche; Maïmouna	Marlène ?	Tracy ?	Ak-Rame; Ma & Mota	Not nominated (2nd place)	Not nominated (1st place)	Awa; Ange; Maïmouna	Third place (Day 56)	
Ange	Unknown (Note: These votes were not broadcast in the Daily Show.)	Ma & Mota ?	Unknown	Ak-Rame; Ma & Mota	Not nominated (3rd place)	Nominated (4th place)	Kaaty; Ak-Rame; Bernika	Fourth place (Day 56)	
Maïmouna	Nominated	Not nominated	Immune	Ak-Rame; Ma & Mota	Not nominated (1st place)	Not nominated (2nd place)	Kaaty; Ak-Rame; Bernika (Note: Maïmouna's votes count double.)	Fifth place (Day 56)	
Bernika	Not nominated	Not nominated	Kitary; Tracy	Nominated	Nominated (5th place)	Secret Room	Awa; Ange; Kaaty	Evicted (Day 49)	
Ak-Rame	Unknown	Tracy; Marlène	Tracy ?	Unknown	Not nominated (3rd place)	Not nominated (1st place)	Awa; Ange; Maïmouna	Evicted (Day 49)	
Yann-Amir	Unknown	Unknown	Ma & Mota ?	Unknown	Not nominated (1st place)	Nominated (4th place)	Evicted (Day 42)		
Tracy	Not nominated	Not nominated	Ak-Rame ?	Immune	Nominated (6th place)	Nominated (3rd place)	Evicted (Day 42)		
Bériche	Nominated	Nominated	Tracy ?	Unknown	Nominated (6th place)	Evicted (Day 35)			
Grâce & Gloire	Kaaty; Tracy; Awa	Awa ?	Kitary; Tracy	Ak-Rame; Ma & Mota	Nominated (Grâce: 5th place; Gloire:4th place)	Evicted (Day 35)			
Ma & Mota	Immune	Not nominated	Tracy ?	Emmanuel; Bériche	Evicted (Day 28)				
Kitary	Kaaty; Bériche; Bernika	Marlène; Kaaty	Bériche	Evicted (Day 21)					
Marlène	Not nominated	Nominated	Evicted (Day 14)						
Tobias	Kaaty; Bériche; Maïmouna	Walked (Day 7)							
Notes	(Note: Ma & Mota are immune due to Ma winning la Voix's dancing competition.) (Note: Marlène was not eligible for nomination since she had temporarily left the House for hospitalisation.)	None	(Note: Kaaty received immediate nomination during the prime-time show.) (Note: Marlène, after being evicted, chose to immunise Maïmouna.)	(Note: Kitary, after being evicted, chose to immunise Tracy.) (Note: Bernika receives immediate nomination for having broken one of la Voix's Ten Commandments.) (Note: Ange, Awa, Gräce & Gloire, Maïmouna, Tracy and Yann-Amir win the Olympiads organised by la Voix and are therefore immunised.)	(Note: This week is themed "tied destinies": the Housemates are grouped into pairs and face quiz challenges to earn points. The two pairs with the fewest points are nominated. The nominated pairs are Bernika & Grâce and Bériche & Tracy. Finally, due to Grâce & Gloire being a two-in-one Housemate, Gloire joins Grâceamong the nominated Housemates.) (Note: La Voix announces that only the Housemate with most votes will be saved from eviction. Eventually, the two Housemates with the fewest votes (Bériche and Grâce & Gloire) are indeed evicted, while Bernika, who received the most votes, is fake evicted and joins a Secret Room for the next week, unbeknownst to the other Housemates, including Tracy.)	None			
Walked	Tobias	None							
Survived Eviction	Kaaty; ~~47.2%~~; ~~to save~~ Maïmouna; ~~30.4%~~; ~~to save~~ Bériche; ~~22.4%~~; ~~to save~~	Kaaty; 37.7% to save Bériche; 32% to save	Kaaty; 42.7% to save Tracy; 42% to save	Ak-Rame; 42.4% to save Bernika; 33.3% to save	Tracy; 32.4% to fake evict	Awa; 50.7% to save Ange; 25.2% to save	Kaaty; 40.5% to save	Awa; 52.8% to win	
Evicted	None (Note: Eviction cancelled due to Tobias walking.)	Marlène; 30.3% to save	Kitary; 15.3% to save	Ma & Mota; 24.3% to save	Bernika; 35.1% to fake evict	Yann-Amir; 14.8% to save Tracy; 9.3% to save	Bernika; 34.3% to save Ak-Rame; 25.2% to save	Kaaty; 22.2% to win	Emmanuel; 21.5% to win
Evicted	None	Marlène; 30.3% to save	Kitary; 15.3% to save	Ma & Mota; 24.3% to save	Bériche; 27.4% to fake evict Grâce & Gloire; 5.1% to fake evict	Yann-Amir; 14.8% to save Tracy; 9.3% to save	Bernika; 34.3% to save Ak-Rame; 25.2% to save	Ange; 1.9% to win	Maïmouna; 1.6% to win

== Season 2 ==
The second season of Secret Story Afrique was confirmed on 23 March 2025 in a social media post from Canal+ Afrique calling for contestants. The opening date was later confirmed as 4 October 2025.

Similarly to the first season, Daily Shows are broadcast from Monday to Friday at 18:15 GMT; while Prime-Time Shows were broadcast each Saturday at 20:30 GMT. The two hosts are still Jean-Michel Onnin and Stéphanelle, and La Voix is still played by Keiffren Bondobari.

The season ran from 4 October to 30 November 2025. The winner was Moctar Mamadou, from Niger.

=== Contestants ===
Unless otherwise specified, every Housemate entered the House on Day 1.

==== Ahinandje ====
Mankandjou Ahinandje David Orlando Covi is a 30-year-old content creator and comedian from Benin. He was excluded on Day 15. He has dwarfism.

Secret: "We are a couple.": one of the Housemates, Josée, is Ahinandje's girlfriend.

==== Bonaventure ====
Bonaventure Lokou is a 27-year-old physiotherapist, sport coach, and model from Togo. He was evicted on Day 43.

Secret: "I am an international rugby player.": Bonaventure plays rugby for Togo's national team.

==== Christopher ====
Julien Christopher Moufonda is 22 years old, and comes from the Republic of the Congo. He was evicted on Day 29.

Secret: "I am the Master of Time.": Christopher secretly gets shown videos from moments in the House, and decides if he wants to disclose them to the rest of the Housemates.

==== Cynthia ====
Cynthia is 26 years old and comes from Senegal. She was ejected from the House on Day 6.

Secret: "I am a rare birth phenomenon.": Cynthia was born "with the caul", which happens to 1 in 80,000 births.

==== Delly ====
Delly Dryce Ayinkamiye is 23, and comes from Burundi. She was evicted on Day 22.

Secret: "We swapped identities.": Delly shares this secret with Gracy, with whom she swapped identities (name, age, country) just before entering the House of Secrets.

==== Félicia ====
Félicia Laureen Um is a 23-year-old student and model from Cameroon. She was evicted on Day 43. She is an amputee, and has a prosthetic right leg.

Secret: "I am an armwrestling champion.": Félicia is a double bronze medallist in female para-armwrestling at the Riyadh 2023 World Combat Games.

==== France ====
Marie France Munyampundu Gusenga, professionnally known as France Mpundu, is a 26-year-old singer from Rwanda. She entered the House on Day 2 and placed fourth in the Final on Day 57.

Secret: "I am a nationwide famous singer.": France Mpundu is a famous singer in Rwanda.

==== Gracy ====
Gracy Leonick Marivelo is a 22-year-old singer from Madagascar. She got evicted on Day 50.

Secret: "We swapped identities.": Gracy shares this secret with Delly, with whom she swapped identities (name, age, country) just before entering the House of Secrets.

==== Hulda ====
Hulda Géraldine Bouda is a 25-year-old journalist from Burkina Faso. She got evicted on Day 15.

Secret: "My age defies time.": Hulda was born on 29 February, and therefore only celebrates her birthday every four years.

==== Joël ====
Joël Mukendi, professionally known as Jordan Mukendi, is a 25-year-old model and actor from the Democratic Republic of the Congo, living in Johannesburg. He entered the House on Day 8, and placed fifth in the Final on Day 57.

Secret: "I am a polyglot."

==== Josée ====
Josée is 33 years old, and comes from Benin. She was evicted on Day 36.

Secret: "We are a couple.": one of the Housemates, Ahinandje, is Josée's boyfriend.

==== Moctar ====
Moctar Mamadou is a 33-year-old entrepreneur from Niger, currently living in Senegal. He won the Final on Day 57.

Secret: "I am descended from a princely lineage."

==== Moussa ====
Moussa Koita is a 25-year-old influencer from Mali. He entered the House on Day 0, and placed second in the Final on Day 57.

Secret: "I entered the House 24 hours before the other Housemates.": Moussa entered the House on Day 0 (3 October 2025).

==== Nadine ====
Nadine Lambou is a 40-year-old make-up artist from Cameroon. She was evicted on Day 22.

Secret: "I was declared dead.": Nadine has been the victim of medical negligence while in the emergency room for a stroke. She was mistakenly declared dead after CPR was performed, even though her heart had restarted.

==== Ouaidou ====
Ouaidou Kouloubara is a 21-year-old student pilot from Chad. He was evicted on Day 36.

Secret: "I am a stutterer."

==== Papus ====
Papus Benze Keita or Kemo Keita, formerly known as Papi Flex, is a 30-year-old contorsionist from Guinea, currently residing in Wingene, Belgium. He was evicted on Day 29.

Secret: "My name is featured in the Guinness Book of Records.": Papus holds the male record for the "fastest time to cram into three boxes of decreasing size", since 2025.

==== Sarah ====
Sarah "Bulby" Kouadio is 27 years old and comes from Côte d'Ivoire. She placed third in the Final on Day 57.

Secret: "I eat objects": Sarah suffers from pica, an eating disorder that causes her to crave eating non-nutritional objects and materials (in her case, wood).

==== Vy ====
Sylvie Linda "Vy Diamond" Sossa is a 29-year-old singer and music producer from Gabon. She was evicted on Day 8.

Secret: "I have been the muse of a famous singer.": Vy has been in a relationship with Beninese singer Fanicko, to whom she inspired a song.

=== Secrets ===
Name	Country	Age	Secret	Discovered by	Status
Moctar Mamadou	Niger	33	"I am descended from a princely lineage."	Moussa (Day 29)	Winner (Day 57)
Moussa Koita	Mali	25	"I entered the House 24 hours before the other Housemates."	France (Day 36)	Runner-up (Day 57)
Sarah Kouadio	Côte d'Ivoire	27	"I eat objects."	Moussa (Day 40)	Third place (Day 57)
France Mpundu	Rwanda	26	"I am a nationwide famous singer."	Moussa (Day 29)	Fourth place (Day 57)
Joël Mukendi	Democratic Republic of the Congo	25	"I am a polyglot."	Sarah (Day 29)	Fifth place (Day 57)
Gracy Marivelo	Madagascar	22	"We swapped identities." (with Delly)	Moctar (Day 4)	Evicted (Day 50)
Félicia Um	Cameroon	23	"I am an arwrestling champion."	Undiscovered	Evicted (Day 43)
Bonaventure Lokou	Togo	27	"I am an international rugby player."	Undiscovered	Evicted (Day 43)
Josée	Benin	33	"We are a couple." (with Ahinandje)	Moctar (Day 24)	Evicted (Day 36)
Ouaidou Kouloubara	Chad	21	"I am a stutterer."	Undiscovered	Evicted (Day 36)
Papus Keita	Guinea	30	"My name is featured in the Guinness Book of Records."	Undiscovered	Evicted (Day 29)
Christopher Moufonda	Republic of the Congo	22	"I am the Master of Time."	Moctar (Day 15)	Evicted (Day 29)
Nadine Lambou	Cameroon	40	"I have been declared dead."	Moussa (Day 19)	Evicted (Day 22)
Delly Ayinkamiye	Burundi	23	"We swapped identities." (with Gracy)	Moctar (Day 4)	Evicted (Day 22)
Hulda Bouda	Burkina Faso	25	"My age defies time."	Undiscovered	Evicted (Day 15)
Ahinandje Covi	Benin	30	"We are a couple." (with Josée)	Undiscovered	Ejected (Day 15)
Vy Diamond	Gabon	29	"I have been the muse of a famous singer."	Undiscovered	Evicted (Day 8)
Cynthia	Senegal	26	"I am a rare birth phenomenon."	Undiscovered	Ejected (Day 6)

	Week 1		Week 2	Week 3	Week 4	Week 5	Week 6	Week 7	Week 8	
Up for eviction	Cynthia; Sarah; Vy	Sarah; Vy	France; Hulda; Moctar; Nadine	Delly; Moctar; Nadine; Ouaidou	Christopher; Moussa; Ouaidou; Papus	France; Josée; Ouaidou; Sarah	Bonaventure; Félicia; Gracy; Moctar	Gracy; Joël; Moussa	France; Joël; Moctar; Moussa; Sarah	
Moctar	Safe		Nominated	Nominated	Safe	Safe	Nominated	Safe	Winner	
Moussa	Safe		Immune	Safe	Nominated	Safe	Safe	Nominated	Runner-up	
Sarah	Nominated		Safe	Safe	Safe	Nominated	Immune	Safe	Third place	
France	Safe		Nominated	Safe	Safe	Nominated	Immune	Safe	Fourth place	
Joël	Absent		Safe	Safe	Safe	Safe	Safe	Nominated	Fifth place	
Gracy	Safe		Safe	Safe	Safe	Safe	Nominated	Evicted		
Félicia	Safe		Safe	Safe	Safe	Safe	Evicted			
Bonaventure	Safe		Safe	Safe	Safe	Safe	Evicted			
Josée	Safe		Safe	Safe	Safe	Evicted				
Ouaidou	Safe		Safe	Nominated	Nominated	Evicted				
Papus	Safe		Safe	Safe	Evicted					
Christopher	Safe		Safe	Safe	Evicted					
Nadine	Immune		Nominated	Evicted						
Delly	Safe		Safe	Evicted						
Hulda	Safe		Evicted							
Ahinandje	Safe		Ejected							
Vy	Nominated	Evicted								
Cynthia	Ejected									
Notes		(Note: Since Cynthia had been ejected, the audience have to vote between Sarah and Vy.)	(Note: Ahinandje was ejected by La Voix.) · (Note: Both France and Hulda should have been evicted, but due to Ahinandje being ejected, only Hulda eventually left the House, as she was the one with the fewest votes.)							
Walked/Ejected	Cynthia	None	Ahinandje	None						
Evicted	None	Vy; 33,2 % to save	Hulda; 3,5 % to save	Nadine; 17,6 % to save Delly; 4,8 % to save	Papus; 9,5 % to save Christopher; 7,1 % to save	Josée; 17,9 % to save Ouaidou; 5,5 % to save	Félicia; 12,6 % to save Bonaventure; 2,2 % to save	Gracy; 12,3 % to save	Moussa; 33,4 % to win	Sarah; 18,8 % to win
Evicted	None	Vy; 33,2 % to save	Hulda; 3,5 % to save	Nadine; 17,6 % to save Delly; 4,8 % to save	Papus; 9,5 % to save Christopher; 7,1 % to save	Josée; 17,9 % to save Ouaidou; 5,5 % to save	Félicia; 12,6 % to save Bonaventure; 2,2 % to save	Gracy; 12,3 % to save	France; 0,8 % to win	Joël; 0,4 % to win
Survived	None	Sarah; 66.8%	Moctar; 51% Nadine; 25.2% France; 20.2%	Moctar; 58.8% Ouaidou; 18.8%	Moussa; 51.5% Ouaidou; 31.9%	Sarah; 38.6% France; 38%	Moctar; 61.7% Gracy; 31.5%	Moussa; 70.4% Joël; 17.2%	Moctar; 45.6%	
