= Manu-kura =

Manu-kura was a famous warrior in the Tuamotuan version of the Rata cycle of Polynesian mythology. His home was in the ocean.

He married Pupura-to-te-tai, the daughter of Puna, king of the Underworld. When Rata met him, they had a contest of magic girdles that Rata won, claiming Pupura as his prize. He took her to his home, where she stayed while he continued his quest to avenge his father.
