= Fethi =

Fethi is the Turkish spelling of the Arabic name Fathi (Arabic: فَتْحِي fat·ḥiy/ fat·ḥī/ fat·ḥy) which means "victorious, triumphant". Notable people with the name include:

== Given name ==
- Féthi Baccouche (born 1960), Tunisian long-distance runner
- Fethi Benslama (born 1961), Paris-based Tunisian psychoanalyst
- Colonel Fethi Bey (1888–1919), Turkish nationalist, journalist and war hero
- Fethi Boucetta (born 1963), Algerian Guantanamo detainee
- Fethi Demircan (born 1938), Turkish footballer and manager
- Fethi Ghariani (born 1964), Tunisian volleyball player
- Fethi Gürcan (1922–1964), Turkish major and equestrian
- Fethi Haddaoui (1961–2024), Tunisian actor
- Féthi Harek (born 1982), Algerian footballer
- Fethi Heper (1944–2025), Turkish footballer
- Fethi Jamal (born 1959), Moroccan footballer and coach
- Fethi Laabidi, Tunisian football manager
- Fethi Missaoui (born 1974), Tunisian boxer
- Fethi Nourine (born 1991), Algerian judoka
- Ali Fethi Okyar (1880–1943), Turkish diplomat
- Ahmed Fethi Pasha (1801–1858), Ottoman marshal, ambassador and industrialist
- Fethi Safwat Qirdar (1896–1966), Iraqi painter and sculptor
- Fethi Sekin (1973–2017), Turkish police office killed on duty
- Fethi Tarbel (born 1972), Libyan lawyer and activist
- Fethi Zghonda, Tunisian musician and composer

== Surname ==
- Ibrahim Faraj Yasser Fethi (born 1984), Egyptian athlete

== See also ==
- Fathi
- Fethi Paşa Korusu, park in Istanbul
