= The New Policeman =

2005 children's fantasy novel by Kate Thompson

- First edition
- Author: Kate Thompson
- Cover artist: Paul Hess
- Language: English
- Series: Liddy
- Genre: Children's fantasy novel
- Publisher: The Bodley Head
- Publication date: May 2005
- Publication place: United Kingdom
- Pages: 407 pp (first edition)
- ISBN: 037032823X
- OCLC: 441364138
- LC Class: PZ7.T3715965 Ne 2007

The New Policeman is a children's fantasy novel by Kate Thompson, published by Bodley Head in 2005. Set in Kinvara, Ireland, it features a teenage boy, J. J. Liddy, who learns that time is leaking from the human world into Tir na nOg, the land of the fairies. It inaugurated a series that is sometimes referred to as the Liddy series.

Thompson and The New Policeman won two important annual awards, the Whitbread Children's Book Award and the Guardian Children's Fiction Prize.

The novel also won the inaugural Irish BA Award for Children's Books in 2006.

HarperCollins published the first U.S. edition under its Greenwillow Books imprint in February 2007.

A Chinese-language edition was published in 2008 with illustrations and music.

== Series ==
There are three novels in the Liddy series, summing more than 1100 pages in their first editions.

- The New Policeman (Bodley Head, May 2005, 0-370-32823-X)
- The Last of the High Kings (Bodley Head, June 2007, 0-370-32925-2)
- The White Horse Trick (Red Fox, April 2010, 978-1-86230-941-8)

As of September 2011, HarperCollins/Greenwillow has published U.S. editions of all three.
