= Kate Thompson (author) =

British-Irish writer (born 1956)

Kate Thompson (born 10 November 1956) is a British Irish writer best known for children's novels. Most of her children's fiction is fantasy but several of her books also deal with the consequences of genetic engineering.

== Biography ==
Katharine Anna Thompson was born in Halifax, Yorkshire, the youngest child of the social historians and peace activists E. P. Thompson and Dorothy Towers. She has lived in Ireland since 1981 and many of her books are set there. She worked with horses and travelled in India, then settled in 1984 in Inagh in the west of Ireland with her partner Conor Minogue. They have two daughters, Cliodhna and Dearbhla. She is an accomplished fiddler with an interest in Irish traditional music, which is reflected in The New Policeman.

She won two major annual awards for The New Policeman (Bodley Head, 2005), set in modern Kinvara and the Irish mythological Tír na nÓg: the Guardian Children's Fiction Prize and the Whitbread Children's Book Award. It also won the Dublin Airport Authority Children's Book of the Year Award for 2005.

She has won the Bisto Children's Book of the Year Award four times, for The Beguilers, The Alchemist's Apprentice, Annan Water and The New Policeman. Creature of the Night was shortlisted for the 2008 Booktrust Teenage Prize and the 2009 Carnegie Medal.

== Works ==
For adults

- There is Something (1992), poetry
- Down Among the Gods (1997)
- Thin Air (1999)
- An Act of Worship (2000)

Illustrated books

- Highway Robbery (2008)

Children's novels

- Switchers Trilogy

Switchers (1997)
Midnight's Choice (1998)
Wild Blood (1999)

- Missing Link or Fourth World trilogy

The Missing Link (2000)
Only Human (2001)
Origins (2002)

- The Beguilers (2001)
- The Alchemist's Apprentice (2002)
- Annan Water (2004)
- New Policeman or Liddy trilogy

The New Policeman (2005)
The Last of the High Kings (2007)
The White Horse Trick (2010)

- The Fourth Horseman (2006)
- Creature of the Night (2008)
- Wanted! (2010)
