= Switchers (novel) =

1994 book by Kate Thompson

- Red Fox edition 1998
- Author: Kate Thompson
- Cover artist: Darren Lock
- Language: English
- Series: Switchers Trilogy
- Genre: Fantasy
- Publisher: Aran Press
- Publication date: 1994
- Publication place: Ireland
- Pages: 201
- Preceded by: None
- Followed by: Midnight's Choice

Switchers is the first book of the Switchers Trilogy by British-Irish Kate Thompson. Originally published in Ireland in 1994, it was first published in Great Britain by The Bodley Head in 1997, then in the United States by Hyperion in 1998. The audiobook narrated by Niamh Cusack was released in 1997.

Switchers introduces Tess and Kevin, the two main characters of the series. The story begins in Dublin, although most of the book is set in the Arctic circle.

The first book by this award-winning writer, it was described as "unmissable" and "spellbinding" by the Sunday Telegraph while in the Guardian it was called "one of the best books of the year". It was shortlisted for the Smarties Book Award in 1998.

== Plot ==
=== Plot introduction ===
Two young Irish shapeshifters (or Switchers) face the menace of an encroaching Ice Age caused by monstrous creatures in the Arctic.

=== Synopsis ===
Having recently moved to Dublin, Tess finds solitude in her power to Switch (shapeshift), escaping city life in favour of the animal world. However, she is troubled by a boy named Kevin, who constantly follows her home when she gets off the school bus, and claims to need her help. He soon reveals that he is also a Switcher, and that he has joined her on several of her recent excursion as an animal. However, Kevin is almost fifteen years of age, and once a Switcher turns fifteen, they lose their powers (something of which Tess was not aware). After much prodding, Tess agrees to follow Kevin to a house owned by an elderly former Switcher named Lizzie, who reveals that enormous, ice-dwelling Arctic slugs called krools have been roused from a millennia-long slumber by recent oil drilling in the area of their hibernation. Now that they are wakeful, they have begun to lower the temperature of the Earth so as to make it more comfortable for themselves, and will not stop until they have brought the entire planet into a new Ice Age. Only Tess and Kevin have the power to stop this.

In the forms of whales the two Switchers swim to the Arctic, where they rest as polar bears. During a dream, Tess suddenly realises the meaning of Lizzie's advice about "being what isn't". She explains to Kevin that because they have been so focussed on what exists in the here and now, they have closed their mind to alternative possibilities, such as Switching into creatures which once existed and are now extinct. Armed with this knowledge, the two transform themselves into mammoths, in which form they continue their journey. A krool sees the mammoths approaching, and resolves to consume them to appease its hunger. As its enormous body rears up to swallow them, however, Tess makes a sudden leap of imagination by Switching into a dragon. Kevin follows suit, and together they melt the krool with their fiery breath. Unfortunately, an American military helicopter sees them, and, mistaking them for UFOs, attempts to destroy them with missiles. The creatures evade these attacks, and begin to move about the Arctic, killing all the krools they can find, thus causing the snowstorms all over the world to die down.

While Tess and Kevin are returning to Ireland, the war-planes pursue them once more, this time attacking with a napalm bomb. They swerve away from the explosion, Switching into birds as they do so, but Kevin's Switch comes a few seconds too late, and he is caught in the blast. Tess waits in the sky above the bomb-site until the dawn of Kevin's fifteenth birthday, but it is clear that he died in the explosion. She returns to Dublin, and speaks to Lizzie, who is not nearly as upset about Kevin's death as Tess had expected. Lizzie explains that she does not know whether there is an afterlife or not and therefore is not in a position to think about where Kevin now is. Tess returns home, and her parents are overjoyed to have her back. However, they notice that she has gone through considerable changes during her absence, and is more isolated than ever before. For the next several months, she considers what to become when she turns fifteen, and finds a downside to almost every option. Tess becomes increasingly lonely as time passes, until one night, she is visited by Kevin, now permanently in the form of a phoenix. Her friend made an immense leap of faith as he was swept up in the explosion, allowing him to survive because phoenixes by nature rise from their own ashes when killed. The book ends as Tess prepares to become a phoenix and fly with Kevin over the city.

== Major characters ==
- Tess: The principal protagonist of the series. Tess is a Switcher, and is thirteen during the events of this book.
- Kevin: Another Switcher, Kevin spends more time as a rat than as a human. He is in his late fourteenth year during the events of the book, and so is confronted with the terrifying choice of what form to take when he Switches for the last time.
- Elizabeth "Lizzie" Larten: An elderly widow and former Switcher who owns many cats.
- Krools: The krools are the main antagonists of the book. They are enormous slugs which thrive in extreme cold, and hibernate for thousands of years at a time in frozen regions such as the Arctic. If awoken, they rampage across the world, eating everything in their path until their hunger is satisfied, after which they set about freezing the planet so as to make it more hospitable to their kind.

== See also ==
- Midnight's Choice
- Wild Blood
- Switchers Trilogy
