= Vahieroa (Tuamotu mythology) =

Mythological figure

In Tuamotu mythology, Vahieroa marries Matamata-taua or Tahiti-to'erau, and on the night of the birth of their son, the great Tuamotuan hero, Rata, the parents go fishing and are snatched away by the demon bird belonging to Puna, king of Hiti-marama, "an island north of Pitcairn and Elizabeth but long since swallowed in the sea."

The bird Matatata‘ota‘o bites off the chief's head and swallows it whole. The wife is placed head downward as a food holder in the house of Puna's wife Te-vahine-hua-rei (Beckwith 1970:261).

== See also ==
- Vahi-vero
- Wahieroa - Māori
- Wahieloa - Hawaii
- Vahieroa (Tahitian mythology)
