= José Fati Tepano =

Chilean judge

José Fati Tepano is the first Rapa Nui male to serve as a titular judge after completing the training program imparted by the Judicial Academy of Chile.

== Background ==
José Fati Tepano, an Easter Island native, was born to Corina Tepano Tuke. He is a former student of the Lorenzo Baeza Vega School, and became a lawyer upon earning a Bachelor of Legal and Social Sciences from the University of Chile.

== Judicial career ==
In 2015, Tepano graduated from the 67th Training Program of the Judicial Academy of Chile. Thereafter, he served as an alternate judge in the jurisdictions of Iquique, Santiago, Valparaíso and Puerto Montt. While Jacobo Hey Paoa (first Rapa Nui male to earn a law degree and become an attorney) served as an alternate or subrogated judge for the Easter Island Court, Tepano is considered the first Rapa Nui titular judge after having undergone the Judicial Academy of Chile's training. He ascended to the bench in Taltal (Antofagasta Region, Chile) in 2017.
