= Wild Blood (novel) =

Fantasy novel by Kate Thompson

- First edition cover 1999
- Author: Kate Thompson
- Cover artist: Darren Lock
- Language: English
- Series: Switchers Trilogy
- Genre: Fantasy
- Publisher: The Bodley Head
- Publication date: 1999
- Publication place: Ireland
- Pages: 167
- Preceded by: Midnight's Choice

Wild Blood (1999) is a fantasy novel by British-Irish writer Kate Thompson. It concludes the stories of Tess, a young Irish shapeshifter (or "Switcher", as they are called in the novel), and Kevin, a former Switcher. It also introduces several other characters, such as Tess's three cousins and their father Maurice. The plot deals with the events leading up to Tess's fifteenth birthday, the day on which all Switchers lose their powers forever and must choose a permanent form in which to spend the rest of their lives.

The audiobook narrated by Frances Tomelty was released in February 2002.

== Plot ==
=== Setting ===
The (very short) first chapter of this book takes place in Dublin, however the majority of the book is set in County Clare, in Western Ireland. The story begins a few days before Tess' fifteenth birthday.

=== Plot introduction ===
Tess is sent to stay with her cousins while her parents are on holiday, but unfortunately finds that her fifteenth birthday will fall while she is still away from home. As she struggles with the choice of what permanent form to take when she loses her powers; a choice in which a mysterious and chilling force soon takes an interest.

=== Plot summary ===
At her cousins' farm, Tess discovers that the house is infested with rats, which enrages her (easily angered) uncle Maurice, who is planning to sell the nearby wood for development. Tess' cousin Orla protests, but when she mentions 'Uncle Declan', Maurice becomes furious, and terrifies them all into silence.

The next morning, Orla claims that she is going to see their uncle Declan, but Tess declines the offer to join her. Kevin (who has come to help Tess through her birthday) poses as an exterminator, and Maurice agrees to pay him £100 to get rid of the rats. Kevin sets about his work, playing a flute and pretending to lure the rats in a manner similar to that of the Pied Piper; in fact he is using his knowledge of the rats' telepathic language to send out a sort of evacuation order. Unfortunately, Maurice finds the corpse of a rat a few days later and takes this as proof that Kevin did not complete his contract. He therefore decides not to pay Kevin, and orders the youth to leave.

While Maurice is showing a property developer around the woods, Tess explores the area with her cousins. She is suddenly dazzled by a flash of light, and when she recovers the three children have disappeared. Maurice and the developer arrive moments later, and they all see Kevin standing nearby, seemingly implicating him as a kidnapper. Maurice commands his wife not to call the police, after which he sets out to find the children. Tess asks her aunt Deirdre about Declan, and is shocked to learn that he is Maurice's long-dead twin brother.

When Tess finds Kevin, he is adamant that he has not been anywhere near the woods since Maurice ordered him to leave. Tess explains the situation, and he informs her of his belief that an ancient, magical presence may be abroad in the woods, one which even they, with their experience of the supernatural world, have never imagined. In the form of a rat, Tess summons the rats of the area to see if they know anything of her cousins' disappearance. One white rat (identifying herself as "Cat Friend") transmits an image of four pairs of feet, which Tess recognises as Colm's, Orla's, Brian's and, unfortunately, Kevin's. Returning to the farm, Tess again asks about Uncle Declan, and Deirdre reveals that twenty years previously, Maurice's brother Declan disappeared near where the children went missing. The loss of his twin traumatised Maurice, and he spent days searching for Declan in the woods.

Tess tracks down Cat Friend, but is surprised when the rat provides her with an image of her cousins and Kevin walking straight through the face of a crag. At Cat Friend's suggestion, Tess becomes a rat and holds onto Cat Friend's tail, allowing Cat Friend to pull her through the rock-face. Inside, Tess finds an enormous fairy sidhe, within which she finds her missing cousins along with Kevin and another boy. Orla introduces the boy as Uncle Declan, and Kevin explains to Tess that the person she saw kidnapping her cousins was in fact Declan, who used a glamour to disguise himself.

Declan tells Tess that he and Maurice were both Switchers in their younger days, and that on their fifteenth birthday they agreed to become members of the Tuatha Dé Danaan so that they could retain their powers; however, at the last moment, Maurice broke his promise and remained human. Ever since then, Declan has resented his brother for abandoning him, and has harassed him in various forms. Declan goes on to explain that all Switchers are descended from the Tuatha de Danaan, which is why they possess the ability to change their forms. When Declan states that his kind are forced to return to Tír Na nÓg when their homes are destroyed, Tess realises that Maurice had intended to sell the land in the hope that Declan would be banished from his life forever, and that Declan is therefore holding Maurice's children hostage. However, Orla speaks up, claiming that her father loves Declan, and moved by her words, Declan agrees to speak to his brother. They find each other in the woods, and reveal the years-old sorrow borne by each at the loss of the other, Maurice explaining that he didn't abandon Declan, but simply hesitated when he considered what their disappearance after their transformation would do to their parents, the hesitation causing him to pause just long enough for him to miss his chance to transform. The rift between them is healed, and Declan agrees to let the children go, as long as Maurice promises not to sell the land, a condition to which Maurice happily agrees.

Once the children are safely with their father, Declan offers to show Tess the possibilities which face her if she chooses to become like him. She agrees, but promises Kevin that she will return to speak to him before her time is up. With Declan, Tess discovers the true extent of her powers and her heritage: She learns how to Switch other objects, how to control the weather, and how to ride the wind, as well as dancing with her immortal ancestors on Ben Bulben. With the moment of her fifteenth birthday only a few minutes away, Tess rides the wind back to where Kevin waits, informing him of her choice to remain a fairy. However, having spent the past few hours considering everything, Kevin insists that this is the wrong choice, and that she should remain human. He reminds her of one of Declan's prior statements about fairies adapting to human perceptions, and tells her that becoming like Declan may make her nothing more than "a figment of someone else's imagination". Furthermore, he claims that with their knowledge of the animal world, he and Tess can fight for the world's animals, and protect them from the ever-more-dangerous human race. Tess agrees, and chooses to live out a mortal life as a human. Despite Declan's original fury at this rejection, he accepts Tess' choice.

== Publication history ==
Wild Blood was first published in Great Britain by The Bodley Head in 1999.

== Reception ==
Kirkus Reviews wrote: "The story develops slowly compared to the first two installments, and stands alone only by virtue of repeated back filling, but readers will see how tempting each of Tess’s options are, and how her previous experiences influence her eventual choice." Sally Estes of Booklist wrote that while the "scenes of Tess in her various animal personae, as well as the overall feeling of dread that permeates the story, are well handled", the conclusion is "heavy-handed and overly tidy." Tina Hudak of the School Library Journal wrote that the novel "will appeal to pre-adolescents especially, as Tess must decide between her own narcissistic desires or being a voice for the earth's wild creatures" and that it "illuminates the complex psychological dilemmas of changing family relationships."

== See also ==
- Switchers
- Midnight's Choice
- Switchers Trilogy
- Kate Thompson
