= Roua =

Polynesian god

In Tahiti and Society Islands mythology, Roua (or Rahoua or Tubua), is the creator god of the Tuamotus. He is the father of Fati, the god of the Moon, and all the stars by Taonoui.
