= Creature of the Night (novel) =

Young adult novel by Kate Thompson

- First edition
- Author: Kate Thompson
- Language: English
- Genre: Young adult
- Publisher: Bodley Head
- Publication date: 5 June 2008
- Publication place: United Kingdom
- Pages: 256
- ISBN: 978-0-370-32929-1
- OCLC: 213382225

Creature of the Night is a young adult novel by Kate Thompson. It was first published by Bodley Head on 5 June 2008. It was shortlisted for the Carnegie Medal and the 2008 Booktrust Teenage Prize.

== Plot summary ==
Bobby, the fourteen-year-old narrator, is a thief and a hooligan. When his mother moves him and his young brother to a cottage near Ennis in County Clare his only thought is how to get back to a life of crime in Dublin. Eventually he steals a Skoda car and goes back, only to find things have changed and he has no place there. He reluctantly returns to the cottage and is given work by a local farmer.

The cottage they are living in is on a path between two fairy forts. The family is warned by the farmer's mother to put out a bowl of milk every night, but they consider this a mere superstition. Being deprived of the milk, a little old fairy woman comes through the dog flap into the kitchen. Dennis, Bobby's brother, sees and accepts her, but for Bobby it is a baffling and rather frightening mystery.

== Reception ==
The Irish Times comments that Kate Thompson "conveys extraordinarily well not only Dublin's mean streets but country rhythms, and how city trends are infecting every town in Ireland". The Guardian comments that in the novel, "all events are true to the characters involved and help to reveal something about them". Bookheads describe Thompson's storytelling as "poetically insightful".
