= Wahieroa =

Māori mythological figure

In Māori mythology, Wahieroa is a son of Tāwhaki, and father of Rātā.

Tāwhaki was attacked and left for dead by two of his brothers-in-law, jealous that their wives preferred the handsome Tāwhaki to them. He was nursed back to health by his wife Hinepiripiri. She helped him back to their house, and brought home a long piece of timber for the fire, to keep him warm. Shortly afterwards, a son was born to them, and named Wahieroa. The name, meaning 'long piece of firewood', was chosen to fix in their son's mind the wrong that had been done to Tāwhaki, in order that one day Wahieroa might avenge him.

In another version, Tāwhaki told his people to collect firewood, and went himself to gather some. The others were lazy, and brought back little wood, but Tāwhaki returned with a long piece of timber on his shoulder. When he saw what the others had brought, he threw it down, and the noise startled them. Tāwhaki told his wife to call their child Wahieroa when it was born, to remind them of the incident. The child was raised with care, and when he grew to adulthood he married Tonga-rau-tāwhiri. When she was pregnant, she had a craving to eat the flesh of a tūī bird, and asked Wahieroa to catch one. Wahieroa did so. It was cooked and she ate it with relish. Some time later she asked him to bring her another. Wahieroa went into the forest with his slave, but could not find any tūī. The two men went further and further into the forest, until they came to the hunting grounds of Matuku-tangotango, who killed Wahieroa and captured his slave. Shortly after Wahieroa had been killed, Matoka-rau-tawhiri gave birth to a son, named Rātā, who would one day avenge the death of Wahieroa.

== See also ==
- Wahieloa – Hawaii
- Vahieroa (Tahitian mythology)
- Vahieroa (Tuamotu mythology)
- Vahi-vero – Tuamotu
