= Pahuanui =

Creature in Tahiti and Society Islands mythology

In Tahiti and Society Islands mythology, Pahuanui or Pahuanuiapitaaiterai is a sea monster.
