= Puna (mythology) =

In the Polynesian narrative of the Tuamotus archipelago in the South Pacific, Puna is the king of Hiti-marama or of Vavaʻu, depending on the story.

In one story, Vahieroa weds Matamata-taua, also called Tahiti To‘erau. On the night of their son Rata's birth, the parents go fishing. They are snatched away by the demon bird belonging to the Puna, king of Hiti-marama, "an island north of [present-day] Pitcairn and Elizabeth but long since swallowed in the sea." The bird Matatata‘ota‘o bites off the chief's head and swallows it whole. The wife is placed head downward as a food holder in the house of Puna's wife Te-vahine-hua-rei (Beckwith 1970:261).

In a second version, Vahi-vero is the son of Kui, a demigod of Hawaiki, and a goblin woman named Rima-roa. Kui plants food trees and vegetables and is also a great fisher. The goblin woman Rima-roa robs his garden; he lies in wait and seizes her, and she bears him the son Vahi-vero. Vahi-vero visits a pool from which the beautiful Tahiti-tokerau daily emerges. Kui teaches him how to lie in wait and seize her, and never let her go until she says his name. Having mastered her, he finds that Puna, king of Vavau, is his rival.

Vahi-vero goes by way of the pool to the place where Puna guards the girl in a house with round ends, and leaves her sister Huarehu in her place, taking Tahiti-tokerau away with him. Tahiti-tokerau bears him the boy Rata. Puna comes in shark form for vengeance and kills Vahi-vero before taking his wife back. He turns her eyes into lights for her sister to make sennit (magi-magi) and her feet into supports for the sister's work basket.

== In popular culture ==
The Warcraft III: Reign of Chaos map, Defense of the Ancients, features Pugna, a hero inspired by Puna.

Puna is the boss for the South Pacific section of Tomb Raider III.
