= Aremata-Popoa and Aremata-Rorua =

Tahitian myth

In the Tahitian story of Rata 'Aremata-Popoto ("tidal wave") and 'Aremata-Roroa ("long wave") are two ocean-dwelling monsters that Rata must overcome. These formidable beings personify the terrifying power of the sea, serving as the final gatekeepers that the hero must outsmart or defeat to ensure the safety of his voyage.

== See also ==
- Rātā (Māori mythology)
- Laka for the Hawaiian equivalent
