= Youssef Ben Hayoun Sadafi =

Moroccan actor, model and fighter

- Born: 22 December 1990 (age 34); Agadir, Morocco
- Occupation(s): Actor, Model, Fighter
- Years active: 2014–present

Youssef Ben Hayoun Sadafi (Arabic: يوسف بن حيون صدافي) born (22 December 1990-) in Agadir is a Moroccan actor, model and fighter. He rose to popularity through the TV series Thousand and One Nights on Medi 1 TV playing the role of "Farès", and later during his participation in Arab casting, an Arabic talent show.

== Biography ==
Born in Agadir of a Moroccan father and an Italian mother, Ben Hayoun Sadafi grew up in Marrakesh, before travelling to Italy to study when he was 18.

=== Model ===
Ben Hayoun Sadafi began a career in modeling when he was almost in his twenties. He appeared in campaigns and photo shoots for brands such as Johnnie Walker and Wings of Freedom in addition to a shoot for the Ministry of Tourism to promote domestic tourism in Russia.

=== Actor ===
Ben Hayoun Sadafi's first appearance on Moroccan TV, was as "Farès" in the Moroccan series "1001 Nights" in 2011. He also participated in Arab Casting, a talent show aired on Abu Dhabi TV "Chorouq", and served as Nabila Benatia's bodyguard during the shooting of reality TV Allo Nabila in Marrakech.

He had the main role in the Inwi action webseries #code, which premiered on 1 June 2017.

=== Fighter ===
Ben Hayoun Sadafi began martial arts at the age of 4, starting with taekwando and continuing aged 12 with kickboxing and later, Brazilian jiu-jitsu. In 2012, he won the gold medal in Brazilian jiu-jitsu in Morocco and Tunisia
