= Taonoui =

Tahiti and Society Islands goddess

In Tahiti and Society Islands mythology, Taonoui is the mother by Roua of Fati and all the stars.
