= Wahieloa =

Hero in Hawaiian religion

In Hawaiian religion, Wahieloa is a hero associated with the Kahaʻi and Laka epics.

Variations of his name in other Polynesian languages include Wahieroa (Māori), Vahieroa (Tahiti, Tuamotus), Vaʻieroa (Cook Islands), Fafieloa (Samoa), and Vahieʻoa (Marquesa).

== See also ==
- Wahieroa – Māori
- Vahieroa (Tahitian mythology)
- Vahieroa (Tuamotu mythology)
- Vahi-vero – Tuamotu
