= Jacobo Hey Paoa =

Chilean attorney and politician

Jacobo Hey Paoa is the first Rapa Nui male to earn a law degree and become an attorney.

== Family ==
His parents, Urbano Edmunds Hey and Carolina Paoa Rangitopa were from Rapa-Nui. Urbano, who once served as the mayor of Hanga Roa, was the son of Henry Percy Edmunds and Sofia Catalina Renga No'i No'i Hereveri Vaka. From 1904 to 1929, Edmunds was the manager of the Scottish-Chilean company Williamson Balfour Agency—a sheep-raising and nitrates merchant that created the Island Exploitation Company. In addition to Urbano, Edmunds fathered Juan Edmunds Rapahango from a prior marriage. Rapahango was the father of politician Pedro Edmunds Paoa, and each would serve as the Mayor of Easter Island (Rapahango: 1973-1979, 1990-1992; Paoa: 1994-2008, 2012-ongoing).

== Educational background and legal career ==
Jacobo Hey Paoa traveled from Easter Island and settled in Santiago, Chile, at thirteen. He had difficulty adjusting to his new life, as he did not speak Spanish and was enrolled at an experimental school with unconventional teaching methods. Later, as an adult, Paoa himself entered the educational field. He graduated from the José Abelardo Núñez Higher Normal School as a Normalist Professor and eventually became the educational institution's director. In 1974, he began studying law at the University of Chile. He earned a Master's in Labor Law and Social Security—even receiving an exchange scholarship from the Rotary Club to study in Chicago, Illinois.

== Political life ==
By 1983, he returned to Easter Island. He served as the Provincial Governor from 1990 to 2000 during the governments of the center-left Concertación coalition until his resignation. He was instrumental in preparing the Indigenous Law 19.253 and its subsequent modification to restore the land to the members of the Rapa Nui people. He currently serves as Secretary of the Court, Notary, and Conservator of the Island's Real Estate. In certain instances, he is even called upon to serve as an alternate or subrogated judge for the Easter Island Court.
