= Vahieroa (Tahitian mythology) =

Mythological son of wife

In Tahitian mythology, Vahieroa is a son of Tafa'i and his wife Hina, and is born at his father's house in the Tapahi hills of Mahina in north Tahiti. He weds Maemae-a-rohi, sister of the ruling chief Tumu-nui.

When Tumu-nui sails with his supporters in the canoes Matie-roa and Matie-poto to recover his daughter Hau-van'a who has sailed away to marry King Tu-i-hiti of Hiti-au-revareva, a giant clam attacks them, and the entire party of Tumu-nui is swallowed up. His younger brother 'Iore-roa (big rat) and his brother-in-law Vahieroa go to seek him and are swallowed in their turn. Vahieroa's wife Maemae-a-rohi, who has been left as regent, rears her son Rata and herself sails with Tumu-nui's wife, leaving her son as regent in her place, and on her return is drawn in by the clam just as her son arrives to rescue her and restore the bones of the other voyagers (Beckwith 1970:260-261).

== See also ==
- Wahieroa - Māori
- Wahieloa - Hawaii
- Vahieroa (Tuamotu mythology)
- Vahi-vero - Tuamotu
