= Kui (Māori mythology) =

Character in Māori mythology

Kui was a chthonic demigoddess and the wife of Tuputupuwhenua in Māori mythology. They supposedly live underground and when a new house is built, a tuft of grass is offered to them.

Kui is also the name of the father of Vahi-vero and the grandfather of Rata in the Tuamotu islands.
