= Rata (Tuamotu mythology) =

In the Tuamotu islands, the telling of the full cycle of the legend of Rata takes several evenings to tell.

The legend begins with his grandfather Kui, a demigod who marries Puehuehu. Their son Vahi-vero was stolen by two wild ducks that carry him to a distant island where two witches Nua and Mere-hua imprison him. Kui eventually rescues his son, captures the witches, and kills the ducks.

Once Vahi-vero reaches adulthood, he falls in love with a water-nymph Tahiti-tokerau, whom he persuades to marry him. She, however, is abducted by Puna, king of the underworld. Following his father's advice, he swims down to the underworld and rescues her while Puna is away. Shortly thereafter, Tahiti-tokerau becomes pregnant and gives birth to Rata.

Not long after the birth of Rata, Puna returns and learns that Tahiti-tokerau had been rescued. He summons the shark Matuku-tagotago who attack Vahivero and Tahiti-tokerau while they are crabbing. The shark swallows them and takes them back to Kororupo where Tahiti-tokerau is buried head down in the sand.

The orphan Rata is raised by his grandfather. When he learns of his parents' fate, he builds a large canoe to find them. Using his grandfather's magical adze, he enters the forest and chops down a tree. Overnight, however, goblins had restored the tree. He ambushes them and forces them to complete his canoe, which they accomplish in a single night. Rata then begins his quest to find his parents, which includes various adventures including defeating champion warrior Manu-kura in a contest for the hand of his wife, princess Pupura-to-te-tai, Puna's daughter. As he nears Puna's land, he must overcome various monsters, including Matuku-tagotago, the shark that had killed his father, whom he cuts out of Matuku's belly. Rata, with the help of his servant Taraka, finally kills Puna, rescues his mother and restores her to health. They all return home.

== See also ==
- Rata (Tahitian mythology)
- Rātā (Māori mythology)
- Laka (Hawaiian and other Polynesian mythology)
