= Fathi Nasri =

Tunisian poet and scholar

- Born: July 7, 1958 (age 67); Tunisia
- Education: BA and PhD in Arabic language and literature
- Occupations: Writer, poet, scholar
- Years active: 1994–present

Fathi Nasri (Arabic: فتحي النصري), a Tunisian writer, poet and scholar, was born in 1958. He has published more than five poetry collections, including his first collection "Jarrar al-Layl". He has also published numerous literary research and studies in Arabic literature and poetry.

== Education and career ==
Fathi Nasir was born in Tunisia on July 7, 1958. He studied at the Higher Institute of Teachers in Tunis and obtained a bachelor's degree in Arabic Language and Literature in 1983, then he obtained a Certificate of Proficiency in Research in 1993. In 2003, Nasri earned his PhD in Arabic Language and Literature. He works as a lecturer and has been the Dean of the Arabic Language Department at the Faculty of Humanities and Social Sciences in Tunis since April 2011. He is also a researcher specializing in Arabic Literature. Nasir began his career in Arabic poetry in 1994, when he published his first collection of poetry, "The Hopeless Said". A year later, he published his second collection of poetry "Voices of the House". Nasri has published so far more than five poetry collections, in addition to numerous literary research papers, critical and analytical studies on Arabic literature and poetry. In 2020, He published the book "My Friend, Rida Lenin .. Papers from the Biography of Jabal Matoub" issued by the Meskeliani Publishing and Distribution House, which is an autobiography of Nasri. In his book, Nasri discussed about some topics and ideas, including a critical reading of the party the newspaper, the university in Tunis, and also the events of the Tunisian revolution in 2011, and many other topic which are mostly controversial.

== Works ==
- "The Hopeless Said" (original title: Kalat Al Ba'eesa), 1994
- "The Voices of the House" (original title: Aswat Al Manzal), 1995
- "Aerosol Biography" (original title: Seerat Al Habaa), 1999
- "Jars of the Night" (original title: Jerrar Al-Lail), 2006
- "Miniature" (original title: Munamnmat), 2012
- "The Poems" (original title: Al Ash'aar), 2013
- "As someone who missed an appointment and doesn't want to Give Up" (original title: Mithla man Fawata Maa'edan wala Yoreedo An Yay'as), 2015
- "My Friend, Reda Lenin ... Papers from the Biography of Jabal Matoub" (original title: Sadiqi Reda Lenin .. Awraq Min Serat Jabal Matoub), 2020
