= Tumu-nui =

Mythological Tahitian figure

Tumu-nui is the name of several figures in Tahitan mythology.

In the creation myth of the Society Islands, Ta'aroa creates Tumu-nui and his wife Paparaharaha as foundations for the Earth. Ta'aroa commanded them to approach one another, but they both refused as each had a fixed place in the earth.

This is also the name of the uncle of the hero Rata. He was king of Tahiti. When he was lost at sea, his nephew Rata became king.
