= Fathi Uraybi =

Libyan writer (1942–2015)

- Born: 15 March 1942; Al-Sabri, Benghazi, Libya
- Died: 2 April 2015 (aged 73)
- Education: Arri Academy (1969); Visnews (1978); Arab Center for Radio and Television Training (1988)
- Occupations: Writer, editor-in-chief photographer, photojournalist, film director, television director, film producer, television producer, radio producer, lecturer, graphic designer and digital artist
- Writing career
- Language: Arabic
- Genres: non-fiction, technical articles
- Notable awards: Best Photographic Production – «Fan Al-Taswir» magazine (1986); Golden Award – Arab Image Exhibition (1990); Al-Fateh Al-Azim Appreciation Award for Arts and Literature (1999); Honorary certificate and shield – General Press Authority (2010)
- Website: www.kraassi.com

Fathi Uraybi (Arabic: فتحي العريبي; 15 March 1942 – 2 April 2015) was a Libyan freelance writer and artist. He offered his services in multiple fields; including photography, filmmaking, education, and graphic design. He was the editor-in-chief of Kraassi magazine, which is the leading electronic magazine that discusses chairs in literature and art in the Arabic language, and, later, in all world languages. He directed and produced six cinematographic films and seven television programs, contributed in the establishment of some of the departments of the Libyan television, and hosted over 60 exhibitions locally and abroad. He also served as a lecturer of two courses at Garyounis University. Additionally, he was a member of many clubs, associations and syndicates.

== Education ==
Uraybi completed a number of courses in the fields of filmmaking and writing. He learned about cinematography and montage at Arri Academy in 1969 in Germany, screenwriting and directing at Visnews in 1978 in London, and screenwriting at Arab Center for Radio and Television Training in 1988 in Damascus. He was recognized for his exceptional work by the latter two firms at which he was taught. Firstly, he was ranked first by Visnews for his documentary film, "Life in Wax," which is about the wax museum in London, Madame Tussauds. Secondly, he obtained a Certificate of Appreciation with Distinction for screenwriting "The Red Flower," which is a film about a young boy who offers his shoe-cleaning services for people on the streets.

== Career ==
Photography and Cinematography: In his early years, Uraybi worked as a photojournalist for «Al-Haqiqa» Benghazi newspaper, which was for a period of four years, namely from 1964 to 1968, and then for «Al Iza’a» and «Libya Al-Haditha» magazines in the city of Tripoli. He then shifted to the field of cinematography, in which he specialized in the production of newsreels and documentary films, and served as the representative of the Illustration Magazine of Libya, which was issued by the Department of Media and Culture of the Ministry of Information in Libya. Moreover, Uraybi was entrusted by the management of Libyan television to establish its cinematography department and technical laboratories. In addition, Uraybi organized over 60 solo as well as collective exhibitions within Libya and abroad. Few of these exhibitions took place in Arab cities, such as Damascus, Baghdad, Alexandria, Cairo and Tunis, while others in foreign cities, including Athens, Rome, Valletta, Paris, London and Leicester. His first exhibition ever was held in Benghazi 1965, which was among the complementary activities organized by Annajma Football Club. More of his contributions in the field included directing a series of short cinematographic films.

Specialized teaching: Uraybi, too, specialized in the field of education. He was appointed lecturer by Garyounis University, in which he taught "Preparing for Radio and Television Programs" course in 1985, and "Photography" course in 1997.

Art: After spending many years working as a freelancer, Uraybi decided to devote his time to organizing his photographic archives and independently pursue his profession in the fields of art and photography. He designed book covers and posters, and used his computer to leaning graphic art in his art studio, which he referred to as "Piegon’s Nest" in 1975.

He took part in other cultural activities, which included the following:

- “Zawiya: Spaces – in the Field of Visual Arts” in «Arab Culture» monthly magazine, Benghazi.
- "Zawiya: The Literature of Visual Arts” in «Al Iza’a» monthly magazine, Tripoli.
- He was responsible for the cultural and artistic domains of «Al-Jamahiriya» daily newspaper, Tripoli.
- He has his photographs published on a weekly basis on the last page of «Al-Shams» daily newspaper, Tripoli.
- He had his photographs and articles published in a number of magazines, including «Al-Bayt, » «Al-Mirayah» and «La, » and newspapers, including «Al-Fatih, » «The Green March» («Al-Zahf Al-Akhdar»), «Akbaar Benghazi, » «Al-Mo’tamar» and «Al-Majaal.»
- He wrote technical articles and other articles about visual art for «Akhbar Al-Adab» newspaper, Cairo, and «Fan Al-Taswir» magazine, Beirut.

He was a member of many associations, syndicates and clubs, which, he believed, had no positive impact on his literary and artistic career. He formed part of the following entities:

- Union of Libyan Writers, Benghazi
- The General Association of Journalists, Benghazi
- The General Association of Libyan Artists, Benghazi
- The General Union of Photographers, Painters and Calligraphers, Benghazi
- The Camera Club, London
- Malta Photographic Society, Valletta
- Damascus Photography Club, Damascus
- Iraqi Society for Photography, Baghdad
- Atelier Camclub Alexandria, Alexandria
- Egypt Salon of Photography, Cairo

== Works ==
Uraybi published books in the fields photography and cinematography, which include:

- “The Only Audience” (original title: Al-Mutafarij Al-Wahid), Jeel Wa-Risalah magazine, Benghazi, 1975, and Al-Kashfiyah magazine, Benghazi, 1975.
- "A Guide to the Art of Photography and Visual Art" (original title: Al-Dalil Ila Fan Al-Surah Wa-Al-Tashkil), Dar Al-Jamahiriya publishing house, Misurata, 1998.
- "A Guide to Photography Equipment" (original title: Dalil Aghizit Al-Taswir Al-Daw’i), Dar Al-Jamahiriya publishing house, Misurata, 1998.
- "The History of Photojournalism on the Battlefield" (original title: Tarikh Al-Taswir Al-Sahafi Fi Sahaat Al-Qital), Dar Al-Jamahiriya publishing house, Misurata, 1998.
- "The Third Eye: Methods and Approaches by Renowned Photographers in the Field of Photography” (original title: Al-Ayn Al-Talita: Asalib W-Manahij Fi Al-Taswir Al-Daw’i Ind-a Ash-har Al-Musawirin Fi-l ‘Alam), GBC Libya, Benghazi, 2006.
- "A Simple Guide to Photography using a Digital Camera" (original title: Al-Dalil Al-Muyasar Lil-Taswir Bil-Kamira Al-Raqamiya), Public Cultural Organization, Tripoli, 2010.
- "The Second Dimension of the Conflict" (original title: Al-Bo’d Al-Tani Lil-Qadiyah), General Establishment for Publishing, Distribution and Advertising, Tripoli, 1984. The book discuses the Israeli–Palestinian conflict with young girls and boys.

=== Unpublished manuscripts ===
- "Hadil, the White Dove: An Analytic and Literary Study” (original title: Hadil Al-Hamamah Al-Bayda’: Dirasa Adabiyah W-Tashkiliya)
- “The Sound of the Wind: Creative Arab Women” (original title: Sawt Al-Rih Nisa’ Arabiyat Mubdi’at)
- “The Statue of Liberty: A Documentary Study” (original title: Timthal Al-Huriyah Dirasah Tasgiliya Hawl-a Haza Al-Timthal)
- “Others and I: A Biography of Fathi Uraybi” (original title: Al-Akharun W-‘Ana Sirah Zatiya Lil-Fanaan)
- “Visual Spaces: Readings in Visual Art” (original title: Fada’at Tashkiliya: Qira’at Fi-l Fan Al-Tashkili), Al-Koan Bookshop publications.
- "The Nation of Women: Creative Arab Women in the Fields of Literature and Art” (original title: Dawlat Al-Nisa’: Mubdi’at Arabiyat Fil-Adab W-Al-Fan).
- “Mrs. Fairouz: A Brief Biography and a Rare Selection of her Songs and Pictures” (original title: Al-Sayidah Fairouz: Lamahat Min Sirataha Al Faniyah Wa-Mukhtarat Min Aghaniha Wa-Suwaraha Al-Nadirah).
- “Ayin in the Songs of Umm Kulthum” (original title: Al-‘Ain Fi Oghniyit Al Sayidah Umm Kulthum). The book lists the song lyrics sung by the Egyptian singer, Umm Kulthum, about the Arabic alphabet, Ayin, and references the songwriters and composers of the songs.

== Filmography ==
=== Films ===
- "Just Dreams" (original title: Mujarad Ahlam) (1971)
- “The Ticking of a Clock” (original title: Daqat Al-Sa’a) (1972)
- “Children are Children” (original title: Al-Atfal Atfal) (1972)
- “The Beehive and the Honey” (original title: Al-Khaliyah W-Al-Asal) (1973)
- “Returning to Bisan” (original title: Al-Awda Ila Bisan) (1974)
- “The Lecture” (original title: Al-Muhadara) (1975)

=== Television programs ===
- “Our New Life” (original title: Hayat-una Al-Jadidah) – documentary program (1970)
- “Constructive Path” (original title: Tariq Al-Bina’) – documentary program (1971)
- “The Songs of Life” (original title: Aghani Al-Hayah) – music program (1973)
- “Colors” (original title: Alwan) – miscellaneous program (1974)
- “We Know and We Don’t” (original title: Arfin W-Mish Arfin) – children program (1975)
- “The Rainbow” (original title: Qus Qazah) – cultural program (1985)
- “Visible Dimensions” (original title: Ab’ad Mar’iya) – cultural program (1987)

=== Broadcasts ===
- A 30-minute tape recording issued weekly – 150 episodes, 1981–1985.
- “Visual Dimensions” (original title: Ab’ad Tashkiliya) directed by Nabil Uraybi and issued daily for 15 minutes, LJB Benghazi Radio, 1997.

== Awards ==
- He was awarded for the best photographic production by Fan Al-Taswir magazine, Beirut, 1986.
- He was nominated for the Golden Award for professionally portraying the topic of “Childhood” at Arab Image Exhibition, Baghdad, 1990.
- He was nominated for Al-Fateh Al-Azim Appreciation Award for Arts and Literature for his pioneering role in the art of photography, 1999.
- He was awarded an honorary certificate and shield for his pioneering role in the field of journalism by the General Press Authority, 2010. This tribute was the first of its kind in the history of Libyan press.
