= Fathi Saleh =

Egyptian computer engineer and heritage expert

- Born: 22 January 1939; Cairo, Egypt
- Education: Cairo University, University of Paris
- Known for: Founding and directing CULTNAT, documenting cultural and natural heritage using new technologies
- Awards: First-ranking prize for Information Technology from the Arab Towns Organisation
- Scientific career
- Fields: Computer engineering
- Workplaces: Cairo University, Center for Documentation of Cultural and Natural Heritage, Bibliotheca Alexandrina

Fathi Saleh (born 22 January 1939) is an Egyptian professor of computer engineering at Cairo University. He founded the Center for Documentation of Cultural and Natural Heritage (CULTNAT), affiliated with Bibliotheca Alexandrina and supported by the Ministry of Communications and Information Technology. He is a member of the Supreme Council of Culture and leads the Association for the Documentation, Preservation and Valorisation of Euro-Mediterranean Cultural Heritage (Herimed). He was the Cultural Counsellor at the Embassy of Egypt in Paris and the Ambassador of Egypt to the UNESCO from 1995 to 1999. His work primarily involves the application of new technologies in cultural and natural heritage.

== Early life and education ==
Saleh was born in Cairo, Egypt, on 22 January 1939. He received a B.Sc. degree in electrical engineering from Cairo University in 1960. He worked for the Egyptian broadcasting organisation until 1966, then moved to France for doctoral studies. He earned his Ph.D. degree in computer engineering from the University of Paris in 1970. Afterwards, he returned to Cairo University as an associate professor of computer engineering.

== Career and research ==
Saleh was the director of the Center for Documentation of Cultural and Natural Heritage (CULTNAT) from 2000 to 2010. CULTNAT is a research centre that documents and preserves the cultural and natural heritage of Egypt and the Arab world using technologies like digital imaging, geographic information systems, virtual reality, and multimedia. CULTNAT is part of Bibliotheca Alexandrina and is supported by the Ministry of Communications and Information Technology. CULTNAT has worked on several projects, including the Eternal Egypt website, the Memory of the Arab World project, the Coptic Heritage project, the Islamic Heritage project, and the Natural Heritage project.

Saleh is a member of the Supreme Council of Culture in Egypt. He leads the Association for the Documentation, Preservation and Valorisation of Euro-Mediterranean Cultural Heritage (Herimed), an organisation that promotes cooperation and exchange among Mediterranean region countries in the field of cultural heritage. He also teaches computer engineering at Cairo University.

From 1995 to 1997, Saleh worked as a cultural counsellor at the Embassy of Egypt in Paris. He then served as the ambassador of Egypt to UNESCO from 1997 to 1999. In this role, he attended international conferences and meetings related to culture, education, science, and communication. He contributed to the development of the World Heritage Convention and the Convention for the Safeguarding of the Intangible Cultural Heritage.

== Awards and honours ==
In 2010, the Arab Towns Organisation awarded Saleh the first-ranking prize for Information Technology for his work with CULTNAT. He has received additional awards from national and international organisations for his work in cultural and natural heritage.

== Bibliography ==
- IEEE Circuits and Systems Society (1981). 1981 IEEE International Symposium on Circuits and Systems: Proceedings, Radisson Chicago Hotel, Chicago, Illinois, April 27-29, 1981. IEEE Circuits and Systems Society. p. 94.
- Swamy, M.N.S. (1975). Proceedings of the Eighteenth Midwest Symposium on Circuits and Systems, August 11-12, 1975, Concordia University, Montreal, Quebec, Canada. Western Periodicals Company.
- Saleh, Fathi (20 May 2011). "A Virtual Representation of the Egyptian Cultural Heritage". Virtual Archaeology Review. 2 (4). Universitat Politecnica de Valencia: 45. doi:10.4995/var.2011.4549. hdl:10251/139377. ISSN 1989-9947.
