= Fethi Ghariani =

Tunisian volleyball player (born 1964)

Personal information
- Nationality: Tunisian
- Born: 12 May 1964 (age 60)

Sport
- Sport: Volleyball

Fethi Ghariani (born 12 May 1964) is a Tunisian volleyball player. He competed in the men's tournament at the 1988 Summer Olympics.
