= Vahi-vero =

In Tuamotu mythology, Vahi-vero is the son of the demigod Kui and a goblin woman named Rima-roa.

Kui plants food trees and is also a great fisherman. The goblin woman Rima-roa robs his garden; he lies in wait and seizes her and she bears him the son Vahi-vero.

Vahi-vero visits a pool from which the beautiful Tahiti-tokerau daily emerges. Kui teaches him how to lie in wait and seize her and never let her go until she pronounces his name. Having mastered her, he finds that Puna, king of Vavau, is his rival. He goes by way of the pool to the place where Puna guards the girl in a house with round ends, and brings her back with him, leaving her sister Huarehu in her place. Tahiti-tokerau bears to him the boy Rata. Puna comes in shark form to avenge himself, kills Vahi-vero and takes his wife back and makes of her eyes lights for her sister to do sennit work by and of her feet supports for the sister's work basket (Beckwith 1970:261).

== See also ==
- Vahieroa (Tuamotu mythology)
- Wahieroa - Māori
- Wahieloa - Hawaii
- Vahieroa (Tahitian mythology)
