= Pua Tu Tahi =

In the mythology of Tahiti, Pua Tu Tahi was one of the giant monster clams of the deep in the legend of Rata.

== Bibliography ==
- R.D. Craig, Dictionary of Polynesian Mythology (Greenwood Press: New York, 1989), 217;
- T. Henry, Ancient Tahiti (Bernice P. Bishop Museum: Honolulu, 1928), 469-95
