= Fathy =

Fathy is a given name and a surname. Notable people with the name include:

- Fathy Salama (born 1951), Egyptian musician
- Hamdy Fathy (born 1994), Egyptian footballer
- Hassan Fathy (1900–1989), Egyptian architect

== See also ==
- Fathi
