= Rață =

Rață is a Moldovan surname that may refer to

- Andrew Rayel (born Andrew Rață in 1992), Moldovan producer and DJ
- Bogdan Rață, Romanian sculptor
- Mariana Raţă, Moldovan journalist
- Vadim Raţă (born 1993), Moldovan football player
