= Fethi Benslama =

French-Tunisian psychoanalyst, academic and essayist

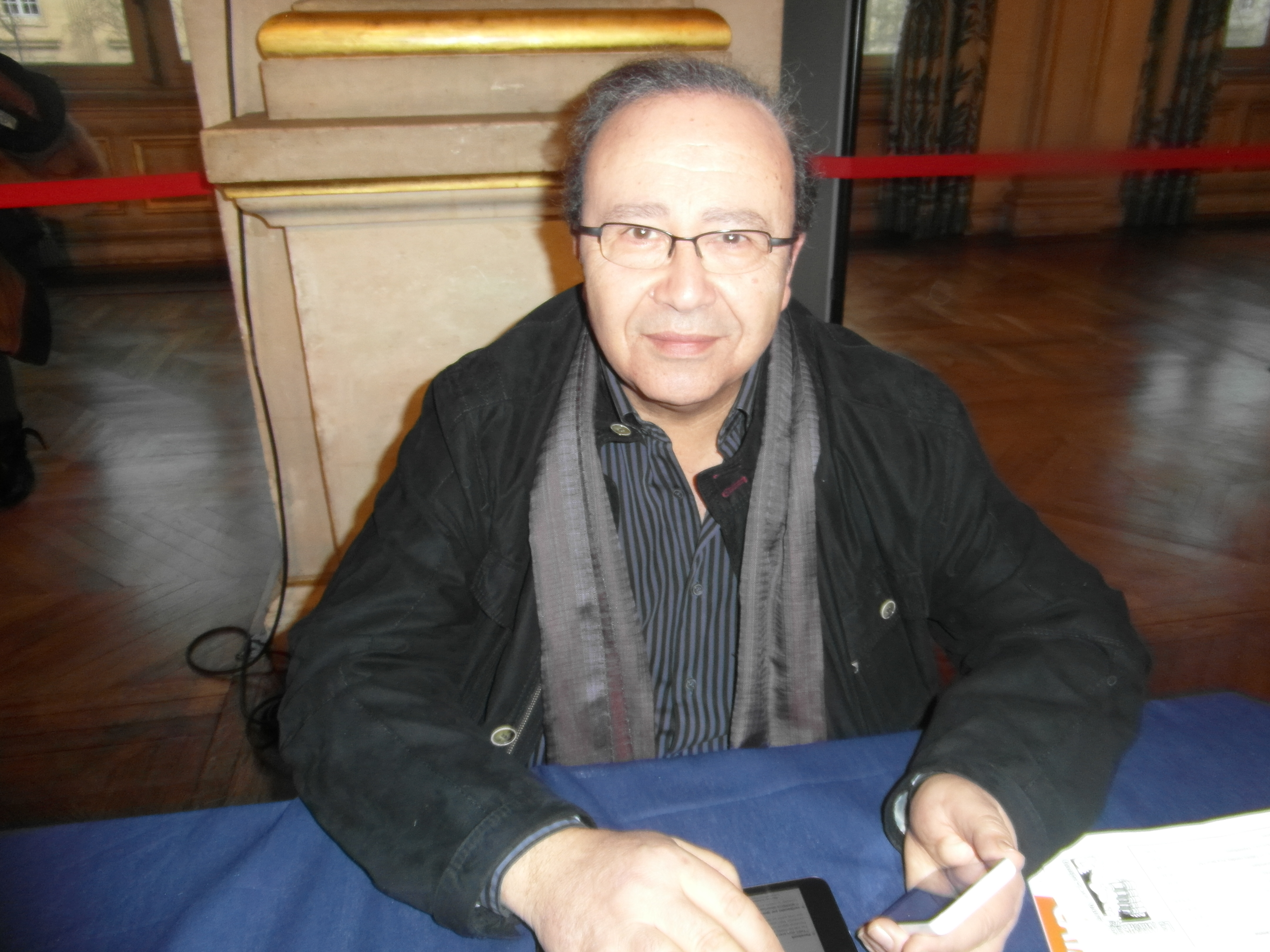
- Fethi Benslama in 2015
- Born: July 31, 1951; Salakta, Tunisia
- Occupation: Psychoanalyst

Fethi Benslama (born 1951) is a French psychoanalyst of Tunisian origin. He is a Professor of Psychopathology at Paris Diderot University, and the author of several books about political Islam.

== Early life ==
Fethi Benslama was born on July 31, 1951 in Salakta, Tunisia.

== Career ==
Benslama is a psychoanalyst. He is a Professor of Psychopathology at Paris Diderot University, and a member of the Tunisian Academy of Sciences, Letters, and Arts. He has authored several books about political Islam, including one about the Arab Spring. He has argued that radical Islam shares elements with religious cults, but he adds that it is partly based on a shared "Islamic identity myth" born out of the reality of war. He has also argued that terrorists kill for the sake of "jouissance," not to act upon suicidal ideation.

Benslama is the co-founder of a deradicalization center for French youths who return to France after visiting Syria. In the wake of the 2016 Nice truck attack, he called for the press to stop publishing the pictures and names of terrorists to avoid their "glorification".

== Works ==
- Benslama, Fethi (1994). Une fiction troublante : de l'origine en partage. La Tour d'Aigues: Editions de l'Aube. ISBN 9782876781542. OCLC 32166993.
- Benslama, Fethi; Tazi, Nadia, eds. (1998). La virilité en Islam. Paris: Éditions de l'Aube. ISBN 9782876784048. OCLC 40431283.
- Benslama, Fethi (2002). La psychanalyse à l'épreuve de l'islam. Paris: Aubier. ISBN 9782700724264. OCLC 401524225.
- Benslama, Fethi (2005). Déclaration d'insoumission : à l'usage des musulmans et de ceux qui ne le sont pas. Paris: Flammarion. ISBN 9782082105248. OCLC 420238914.
- Benslama, Fethi (2011). Soudain la révolution ! : de la Tunisie au monde arabe : la signification d'un soulèvement. Paris: Denoël. ISBN 9782207111529. OCLC 762540744.
- Benslama, Fethi (2014). La Guerre des subjectivités en Islam. Paris: Lignes. ISBN 9782355261282. OCLC 881813224.
- Benslama, Fethi, ed. (2015). L'idéal et la cruauté : subjectivité et politique de la radicalisation. Paris: Lignes. ISBN 9782355261480. OCLC 932068846.
- Benslama, Fethi (2016). Un furieux désir de sacrifice : le surmusulman. Paris: Seuil. ISBN 9782021319095. OCLC 950464909.
