= Hinepiripiri =

Māori legend

In Māori mythology, Hinepiripiri occurs in some versions of the legend of Tāwhaki as Tāwhaki's wife and the mother of Wahieroa (Reed 1963:165).

Hinepiripiri nursed Tāwhaki back to health after he was attacked and left for dead by two of his brothers-in-law, jealous that their wives preferred the handsome Tāwhaki to them. Hinepiripiri helped him back to their house, and brought home a long piece of timber for the fire, to keep him warm. Shortly afterwards, a son was born to them, and named Wahieroa. The name, meaning 'long piece of firewood', was chosen to fix in their son's mind the wrong that had been done to Tāwhaki, in order that one day Wahieroa might avenge him (Reed 1963:165).
