= Amor Fati =

Amor fati is a Latin expression meaning 'love of fate', and refers to seeing everything that happens, including suffering and loss, as good or necessary.

Amor Fati may also refer to:

== Music ==
- Amor Fati (Peccatum album), 2000
- Amor Fati, an album by Sarasara, 2016
- Amor Fati, an album by Guerilla Poubelle, 2013
- Amor Fati, an album by Mich Gerber that featured Imogen Heap
- Amor fati, album by Bertrand Cantat, 2017
- "Amor Fati", a 1996 song by Gary Lachman
- "Amor Fati", a song by Washed Out from the 2011 album Within and Without
- "Amor Fati", a song by Epik High from the 2014 album Shoebox
- "Amor Fati", a song from the soundtrack of Ms. Hammurabi
- "Amor Fati", a song from the film Blood & Chocolate
- "Amor fati", the theme song of South Korean TV show Miss Trot
- "Amor fati", an orchestral music composition by Giorgos Koumendakis, 2007

== Other uses ==
- Amor fati, a 1946 collection of essays on life in Bergen-Belsen by Abel Herzberg
- "The Sixth Extinction II: Amor Fati", a 1999 episode of The X-Files
- Amor Fati, a 2003 art work by sculptor Michael Warren
- Amor Fati (film), a 2005 short film featuring Predrag Bjelac
- Amor Fati #1, a 2013 art work by Shane Guffogg
- Amor Fati (TV series), a 2021 South Korean TV series
- "Amor Fati" (The White Lotus), a 2025 episode of The White Lotus
