= Fati (god) =

Polynesian god of the Moon

In Tahiti and Society Islands mythology, Fati (or Faiti) is the god of the Moon and a son of Taonoui and Roua.

== See also ==
- List of lunar deities
