= Matuku-tangotango =

Mythological Māori monster

Matuku came out of his cave

In Māori mythology, Matuku-tangotango (Matuku) is an ogre who kills Wahieroa the son of Tāwhaki. In some versions, Matuku lives in a cave called Putawarenuku. Rātā, the son of Wahieroa, sets off to avenge his murdered father, and arrives at last at Matuku's village. He hears from Matuku's servant that at the new moon his master can be killed at the pool where he washes his face and hair. When the new moon has come, Rātā waits until the ogre comes out of his cave and is leaning over with his head in the pool. He grabs him by the hair and kills him. Rātā then sets off to rescue his father's bones from the Ponaturi. A South Island version names the islands where Matuku lives as Puorunuku and Puororangi and also states that Rātā nooses Matuku as he comes out of his lair to perform certain rituals (Tregear 1891:232, 399-400).

== Names and epithets ==
- Matuku (bittern)
- Matuku-tangotango ('tangotango' perhaps means 'dark as night', or 'ominous')
- Matuku-takotako (South Island dialect).
