= Fati Mariko =

Nigerien singer (born 1964)

- Born: Fatimata Gandigui Mariko; 1964 (age 61–62)
- Occupation: Singer

Fatimata Gandigui Mariko, better known as Fati Mariko (born 1964), is a Nigerien singer. She rose to prominence as the singer for the band Marhaba.

== Life ==
Mariko received her education in Niamey and Bougouni and developed her typing skills before becoming a musician. Her hit song "Djana-Djana", produced with the group Marhaba and released in 1986, brought her first fame. Mariko has sustained her career as a singer for many decades, sometimes partnering with male stars and hip-hop groups in her productions. Her music is mainly derived from Zarma-Songhay ritual and folk music. She is known for combining tradition with modern influences. One of her songs was a suggestion by a local hospital. It was written about Niamey's National Hospital and the song invites people to support the "Hôpital".

Mariko sings in French and in various native languages of Niger, including Hausa, Djerma, and Fula. Her albums include Issa Haro and Inch Allah.

In 2024, Mariko was employed by the Italian embassy in Niger to help them celebrate the 40th anniversary of their Keita project which is an Italian-Nigerian cooperation. Mariko sang in French but with a number of songs well known in Italian.
