= Rata (Tahitian mythology) =

Mythological Tahitian king

Rata, in Tahitian mythology, is said to have become king of Tahiti when his uncle, king Tumu-nui, and his father Vahieroa are swallowed by a great clam, Pua Tu Tahi, while they are on their way to Pitcairn. When he reaches adulthood, Rata plans to avenge his father. As in the Tuamotuan version, Rata identifies a tree to build his canoe, but it is protected by forest elves. After he captures them they build it for him in a single night. While en route for Pitcairn, Rata and his crew are sucked down into the same clam, but they use their spears to cut the monster open. They rescue the remains of Rata's father and uncle and bury them back in Tahiti. After recovering from their adventure, Rata sets out for further adventures. See also Aremata-Popoa and Aremata-Rorua.

== See also ==
- Rata (Tuamotu mythology)
- Rātā (Māori mythology)
- Laka (Hawaiian and other Polynesian mythology)
