= Fati Jamali =

Moroccan actress

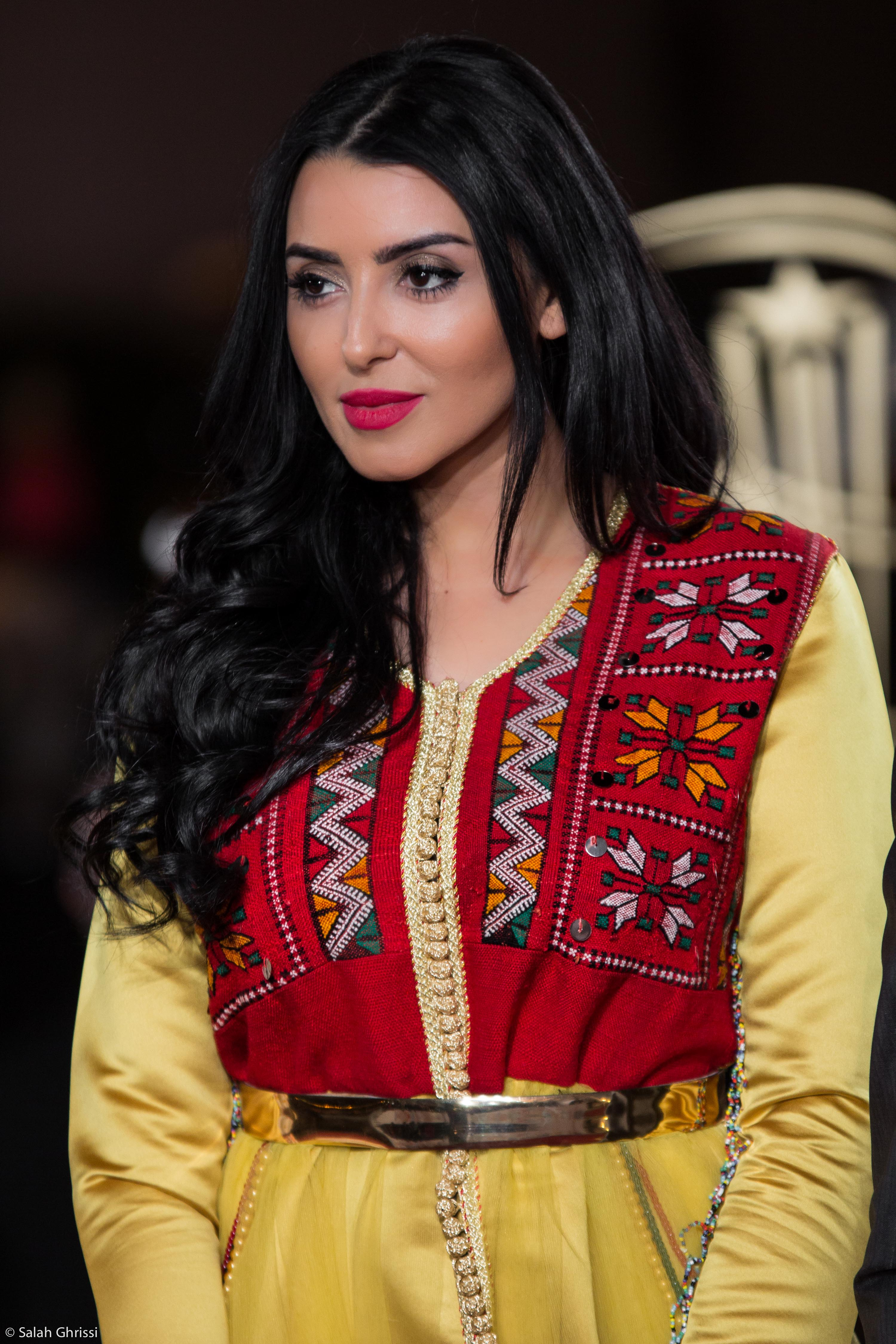
- Born: 14 November 1988 (age 36); Casablanca
- Citizenship: Morocco
- Occupation(s): Model, Beauty pageant contestant, Actor

Fati Jamali (born 14 November 1988) is a Moroccan actress, singer and a television presenter best known as Miss Arab Beauty 2014.

== Acting credits ==
=== Cinema ===
Year	title	director
2018	Adi Ask	Eyüp Dirlik
2019	Les égarés	Said Khallaf
2020	30 Millions	Rabii Chajid

=== Television ===
Year	Title	Notes
2014-2015	Mille et une nuits	Fantasy series : 60 episodes
2016	Hyati	Drama series : 30 episodes
2018	Qoloob Taeha	Drama series : 30 episodes
2019	Domoue Warda	Drama series 30 episodes
2019	Wlad Lahlal	Drama series : 9 episodes
2019-2021	Al Madi La Yamout	Drama series : 60 episodes
2020	Souhlifa 2	Comedy series : 30 episodes
2021	Al Boyot Asrar	Drama series : 30 episodes
2022	Awlad Al Darb	Drama series : 30 episodes
2023	Casa Street	Miniseries by Shahid : 8 episodes

== Discography ==
=== Singles ===
- Ghalta Kbira
- Afwan
- Je l'aime à mourir (Moroccan version)
- Muhur (with Atif Zinachi)
- Tab Tab
- Kid Nsa
- Louhini Ya Laryah ft Bassou (A Comedy series theme)

== TV Host ==
Year	Title
2016	Ramez Plays With Fire
2023	Fasil Wa Nowasil
