= Laka =

Figures in Hawaiian/Polynesian mythology

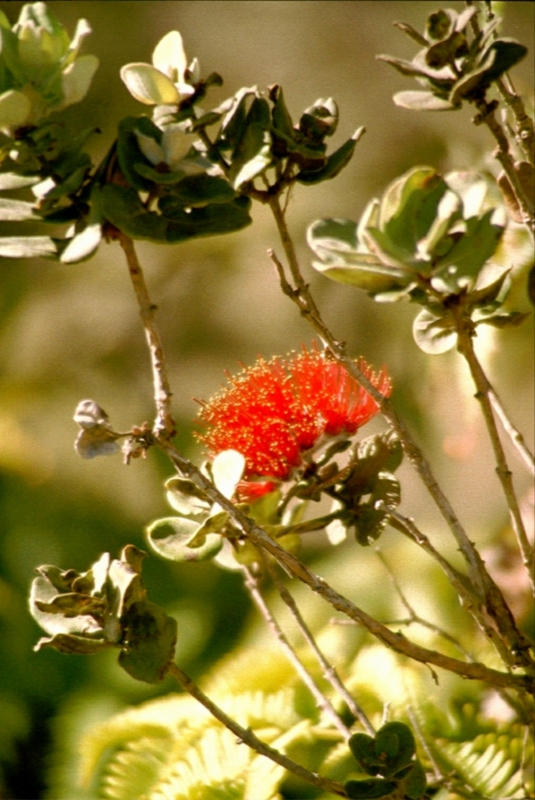
Red lehua blossom (Metrosideros polymorpha).

In Hawaiian mythology, Laka is the name of two different popular heroes from Polynesian mythology. (In other parts of Polynesia they are known as Rātā, Rata, Lata, Ata, or Lasa).

In one Hawaiian legend, Laka is the daughter of the Ali'i nui Wahieloa and Hoʻolaukahili, grandson of Kahaʻinuiahema. He plans to sail to Hawaii to avenge the murder of his father, but his canoe-building is thwarted by the little gods of the forest. Because of his offerings to the great gods, however, they give him two outriggers that binds together for his long voyage. He and his companions successfully steal the bones of his father from the cave of Kai-kapu.

== Hawaii ==
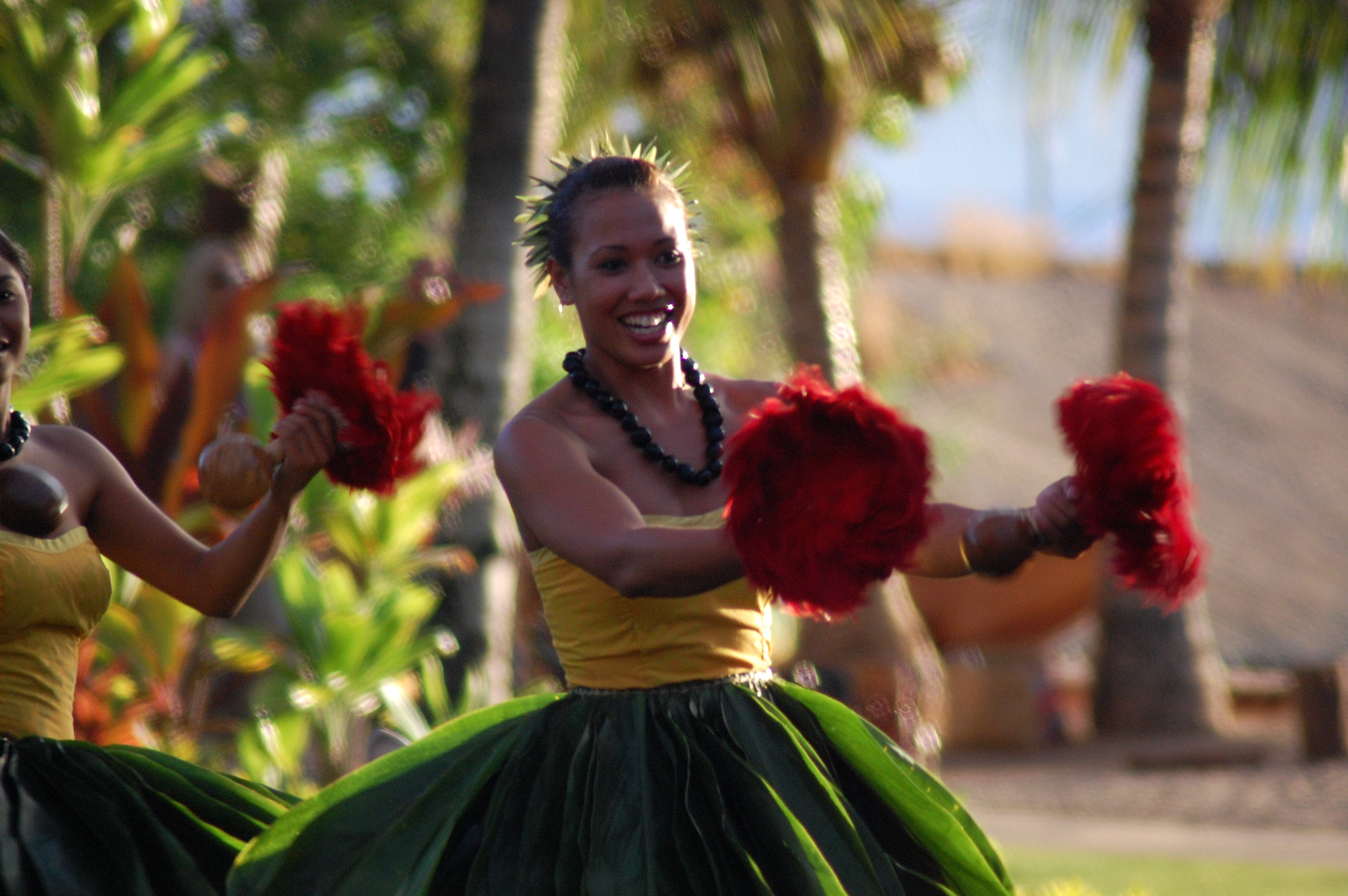
Hula dancers in a Luau in Lāhainā, in traditional kī leaf skirts

Four deities of this name can be differentiated:

1. Ku-ka-ohia-LAKA, male patron of the hula-dance Ku-ka-ohia is the god of Hula dancing and canoe building. He is married to Hina-lula-ohia. In temple, he is shown as a feather god and worshiped with the other Ku gods. He is associated with ohia lehua tree, and the flowers are used for decorations on altars during performances.
2. Papa-o-LAKA, the ʻaumakua world of Kumu-Honua
3. LAKA, goddess of forest growth. Laka is the goddess of Hula. Laka is said to be the inspiration a person thinks of while they dance. She is what causes the movement while the dancer is moved. She is also the goddess of the forest. She has reproductive energy which is said to help the forest grow and thrive. Laka is associated with the Lama tree, the Maile Vine, and the a’ali’i plant. They are her kinolau, which means they are the form she can be found in. These are very cherished and treated with high levels of respect.
4. LAKA, son of Wahie-loa

== Marquesas ==
In the Marquesan version of the myth, Aka is a great voyager, grandson of Tafaki. He made a historic voyage to Aotona (Rarotonga) in what are now the Cook Islands to obtain the highly prized feathers of a red parrot as gifts for his son and daughter. The voyage was done in a great outrigger canoe named Va'ahiva that had 140 rowers. Of these, 100 die of hunger before they reach Aotona, where they capture enough parrots to fill 140 bags with their feathers.

== Samoa ==
In Samoa, where this hero's name is Lata, he is a great canoe builder originally from Fiji. He builds a huge outrigger canoe on the island of Ta'u and sails to Savai'i, where a mountain is named after him. From there, he sails to Tonga where he teaches the inhabitants better ways to build canoes.

== Tonga ==
In Tonga, he is Lasa, who captures the chief of the forest elves, Haelefeke, and compels him to help him build a great canoe and pilot it to Fiji. En route, they are tested by various demons.

== See also ==
- Rātā (Māori mythology)
- Rata (Tahitian mythology)
- Rata (Tuamotu mythology)
- Domesticated plants and animals of Austronesia
