= Switchers Trilogy =

Fantasy book series by Kate Thompson

- Omnibus, Random House 2004
- Switchers (1997); Midnight's Choice (1998); Wild Blood (1999)
- Author: Kate Thompson
- Genre: Fantasy; Young adult
- Publisher: The Bodley Head (UK); Hyperion (US)
- No. of books: 3

The Switchers Trilogy is a fantasy book series for young adults, written by British-Irish author Kate Thompson. The series is mainly set in Ireland. The leading characters are teenagers with the power to shapeshift (or "Switch") into the forms of animals and various supernatural creatures.

== Major characters ==
- Tess: An only child who lives with her parents in Dublin city. Tess is thirteen at the beginning of the first book, and the final book deals with the events which precede her fifteenth birthday, concluding with her turning fifteen. Tess is a Switcher (shapeshifter), as well as being the principal protagonist of the series. She is initially reluctant to accept the existence of the supernatural world which her powers make open to her, and her rather narrow view of the world limits the array of forms which she can take. However, as the books progress, she becomes increasingly open-minded, and her range expands greatly. Throughout the series, Tess struggles with the choice of what to become when she makes her final, irreversible Switch on her fifteenth birthday.
- Kevin: Another Switcher. When he discovered his ability to Switch, Kevin used the animal world as a means of escape from his unfulfilling human life, eventually deciding to leave behind humanity altogether. In Switchers, he appears as a shabbily dressed teenager living on the streets. He assumes the form of a phoenix at the end of this book- albeit out of necessity; he had been hit by a missile while in the form of a dragon and a phoenix was the only form he could think of to save his life-, but Tess finds a way to transform him back into a human at the end of Midnight's Choice, Kevin subsequently coming to accept his human status.
- Elizabeth "Lizzie" Larten: A widowed woman living alone in a semi-rural part of Dublin. Lizzie was once a Switcher herself, but evidently chose to remain human by the time she lost the gift on her fifteenth birthday. She owns many cats, uses atrocious grammar, and is rather eccentric in her views. She acts as Tess's confidante and adviser in matters relating to Tess's powers as a Switcher.

=== The Switching Power ===
The term "Switching" is used in the series as a euphemism for shapeshifting. Most of the series' main characters either possess this gift or did at one point, and are referred to as "Switchers". The power is not limited to creatures of the current age or of the natural world, and can be used to assume the form of animals long-since extinct or of supernatural creatures. However, unless the Switcher is aware of their power's potential as such, these fantastical dimensions of the gift remain untapped. At sunrise on their fifteenth birthday, all Switchers lose their power, and are forever bound to the form in which they exist at that moment. No explanation is ever given for this phenomenon.

Toward the end of the first book, Lizzie reveals that all children are born with the ability to Switch, but that unless they discover it before they turn eight (the age at which their minds begin to conform to the ideas presented by others) it remains dormant within them and never surfaces again. Therefore, very few children ever learn to use the power.

In Wild Blood, the final book of the series, the Switching power is revealed to originate from interbreeding between humans and members of the Tuatha Dé Danann, who were well known for their shapeshifting abilities. This book also reveals that Switchers can choose to become like their fairy ancestors, and so retain their gift beyond their fifteenth birthday, but such a transformation permanently cuts them off from the human world.

== Books ==
=== Switchers (1997) ===
Originally published in Ireland in 1994, Switchers was first published in Ireland by Aran Books in 1994, then in the United States by Hyperion in 1998. The audiobook narrated by Niamh Cusack was released in 1997.

In the novel, a lonely teenage girl named Tess finds solace in using her ability to 'Switch' to explore the animal world. When she meets Kevin, another Switcher, he reveals to her that an enormously powerful force is threatening to usher in a new Ice Age. Kevin and Tess alone have the power to stop this terrible threat. Before she knows what is happening, Tess finds herself leaving behind her comfortable home and her parents to journey with Kevin to the Arctic circle, where they must face the fearsome and ancient krools.

=== Midnight's Choice (1998) ===
Midnight's Choice was published in the United Kingdom by Bodley Head in 1998. The audiobook narrated by Niamh Cusack was released in 2001.

With Kevin happily settled into the form of a phoenix, Tess turns her attention to helping a depressed fellow Switcher named Martin to choose his path when he turns fifteen. But Martin's habits of Switching are unconventional, for he has taken refuge from his grief and loneliness in the cold, dark persona of a vampire. Soon Tess is in a race against time to save Martin, and herself, from the darkness of the vampire world.

=== Wild Blood (1999) ===
Wild Blood was published in the United Kingdom by Bodley Head in 1999, then by Hyperion in the United States in 2000. The audiobook narrated by Frances Tomelty was released in February 2002.

Tess' fifteenth birthday looms ahead, the day when she must soon decide on one, permanent form which she will wear for the rest of her life. Her choice is not made any easier when her parents send her to stay with her cousins in Clare during her birthday. While at her cousins' house, Tess discovers that there is something strange and frightening lurking in the nearby woods, beckoning her to join it in its otherworldly domain.

== Major themes ==
The primary focus of the series is the idea of "coming of age", and the possibilities with which teenagers are faced in the modern world. This theme recurs throughout many of Kate Thompson's books. The series also deals with various mythological creatures such as vampires, phoenixes and fairies, as well as shapeshifters (referred to as 'Switchers' in the books). The idea of choice is another a central theme of the series. Another theme that could be read between the lines, but is stated at the end of the third book, is that the world is in danger and the new generation needs to protect the planet.

== Publication history ==
The three books were published in one volume by Random House in 2004.

== Reception ==
The Switchers Trilogy received very favourable reviews from The Irish Times, as well as from The Sunday Telegraph and Books for Keeps.
