= List of Māori waka =

This is a list of waka (canoes) that voyaged between Hawaiki and New Zealand according to Māori oral traditions. The list represents a compilation of different traditions from around New Zealand. The accounts give several different uses for the waka. More than 40 were migration canoes that carried Polynesian migrants and explorers from Hawaiki to New Zealand. Others brought supplies or made return journeys to Hawaiki. Te Rīrino was said to be lost at sea. The vessels were probably twin-hulled canoes (waka hourua) or large outrigger canoes.

== List of waka ==
Name	Landing place	Traditional regions	Associated iwi or hapū
Aotea	Aotea Harbour	Manawatū-Whanganui, Taranaki, Waikato	Ngā Rauru, Ngāruahine, Ngāti Maru (Hauraki), Ngāti Maru (Taranaki) / Te Iwi o Maruwharanui, Ngāti Ruanui (Ngā Rauru Kītahi), Pakakohi, Tamahaki, Tamakana, Tangāhoe, Te Āti Haunui-a-Pāpārangi, Te Atiawa (Te Atiawa ki Whakarongotai, Te Atiawa Taranaki, Te Atiawa o Te Whanganui-a-Tara), Te Korowai o Wainuiārua, Uenuku
Aotearoa	Kāwhia	Bay of Plenty, Waikato	-
Arahura	South Island	South Island	Ngāi Tahu
Āraiteuru	Shag Point	South Island	Ngāi Tahu
Arautauta	Waiōtahe	Bay of Plenty	Whakatōhea, Te Ūpokorehe
Arawa	Tauranganui, Whangaparaoa, Maketu	Bay of Plenty, Waikato	Ngāti Kea / Ngāti Tuarā, Ngāti Mākino, Ngāti Pikiao, Ngāti Rangiteaorere, Ngāti Rangitihi, Ngāti Rangiwewehi, Ngāti Rongomai, Ngāti Tahu – Ngāti Whaoa, Ngāti Tarāwhai, Ngāti Te Ata, Ngāti Tūrangitukua, Ngāti Tūwharetoa, Ngāti Whakahemo, Ngāti Whakaue, Ngāti Whare, Tapuika, Te Whānau-ā-Apanui, Tūhourangi, Uenuku-Kōpako, Waitaha (Bay of Plenty)
Hīnakipākau-o-te-rupe	Bay of Plenty	Bay of Plenty	-
Horouta	Wherowhero Lagoon	Gisborne	Ngāi Tāmanuhiri, Ngāti Porou ki Hauraki / Ngati Porou ki Harataunga ki Mataora, Ngāti Porou, Rongowhakaata, Te Aitanga a Hauiti
Kahutara	New Plymouth	Taranaki	-
Kāraerae	North Island	South Island	-
Kurahaupō	Takapaukura / Tom Bowling Bay	Northland, Taranaki	Muaūpoko, Ngā Wairiki Ngāti Apa, Ngāi Takoto, Ngāti Apa ki te Rā Tō, Ngāti Kurī, Ngāti Ruanui, Ngāti Tūmatakōkiri, Pakakohi, Rangitāne (Rangitāne o Manawatū, Rangitāne o Te Matau-a-Māui, Rangitāne o Wairau, Rangitāne o Tamaki nui a Rua), Rongomaiwahine, Tangāhoe, Taranaki, Te Kawerau ā Maki, Te Wairoa
Mahangaatuamatua	Tauranga	Bay of Plenty	-
Māhuhu-ki-te-rangi	Pārengarenga, Whangaroa, Tākou Whangaruru, Kaipara Harbour, Rangaunu Harbour	Auckland, Northland	Ngāti Wai (Ngāti Rehua, Ngāti Whātua (Ngāti Whātua o Kaipara, Ngāti Whātua Ōrākei, Te Uri-o-Hau, Te Roroa), Te Rarawa
Mānuka	South Island	South Island	-
Māmari	Hokianga Harbour	Northland	Ngāpuhi (Ngāti Hine), Te Aupōuri, Te Rarawa
Mātaatua	Tākou Bay	Bay of Plenty, Northland	Ngāi Te Rangi, Ngāpuhi, Ngāti Awa, Ngāti Manawa, Ngāti Pūkenga ki Waiau, Ngāti Pūkenga, Ngāti Rāhiri Tumutumu, Tūhoe, Ngā Pōtiki / Ngā Pōtiki ā Tamapahore, Ngāti Whakahemo, Te Ūpokorehe, Te Whānau-ā-Apanui, Whakatōhea
Matahourua	Wellington, Mana Island, Whanganui, Pātea	Manawatū-Whanganui, Northland	Ngāpuhi, Ngāti Rangi
Moekākara	Kawau Island, Motu Kōkako, Goat Island	Bay of Plenty, Auckland, Northland	Ngāti Manuhiri, Ngāti Te Ata, Te Ākitai Waiohua, Te Kawerau ā Maki
Motumotuahi	Whanganui	Taranaki	Ngā Rauru, Ngāti Ruanui
Ngātokimatawhaorua	Whangapē Harbour, Hokianga Harbour	Northland	Ngāpuhi (Ngāti Hine), Te Aupōuri, Te Patukirikiri, Te Rarawa
Nuku-tai-memeha	Whakatāne, Whāngārā	Gisborne	Ngāti Porou
Nukutere	Ahuahu	Gisborne, Bay of Plenty	Ngāti Porou, Te Whakatōhea, Tūhoe, Whakatōhea
Ōkoki	New Plymouth	Taranaki	-
Ōtūrereao	Ōhiwa	Bay of Plenty	-
Pangatoru	Whanganui	Taranaki	Ngā Rauru, Ngāti Ruanui
Riukākara	Mangōnui	Northland	-
Ruakaramea	Herekino	Northland	Ngāpuhi (Ngāti Hine), Ngāti Wai (Ngāti Rehua)
Tahatuna	Mōhakatino	Taranaki	Ngāti Tama
Taikōria	New Plymouth	Taranaki	Ngāti Kurī
Tainui	Whangaparaoa, Bay of Plenty, Kāwhia	Waikato, Auckland, Bay of Plenty, Taranaki	Waikato, Ngāti Maniapoto, Hauraki, Ngāti Raukawa, Ngāti Toa, Ngāti Rārua, Ngāti Koata, Ngāi Tai, Ngāti Hikairo
Tākitimu	Tauranga, Whangaokeno / East Island, Tolaga Bay, Gisborne, Māhia Peninsula, Wairoa, Mōhaka River	Hawke's Bay, Bay of Plenty, South Island	Kāti Māmoe, Ngāi Tahu / Kāi Tahu, Ngāi Tāmanuhiri, Ngāi Te Ohuake, Ngāti Hauiti, Ngāti Hineuru, Ngāti Kahungunu (Maungaharuru Tangitū, Ngāti Kahungunu ki Heretaunga, Ngāti Kahungunu ki Tamakinui a Rua, Ngāti Kahungunu ki Tamatea, Ngāti Kahungunu ki Te Whanganui-a-Orotu, Ngāti Kahungunu ki Wairarapa, Ngāti Whitikaupeka, Te Hika o Papauma), Ngāti Pāhauwera, Ngāti Pāoa, Ngāti Rākaipaaka, Ngāti Ranginui, Ngāti Ruanui, Ngāti Ruapani / Ngāti Ruapani ki Waikaremoana, Ngāti Tamakōpiri, Ngāti Whakahemo, Pakakohi, Rongomaiwahine, Rongowhakaata, Tangāhoe, Tapuika, Te Aitanga a Hauiti, Te Aitanga-a-Māhaki, Te Āti Haunui-a-Pāpārangi, Te Wairoa, Waitaha (Te Waipounamu/South Island)
Tauira	Te Kaha	Bay of Plenty, Northland	Te Whakatōhea, Te Whānau-ā-Apanui
Tāwhirirangi	Bay of Plenty	Bay of Plenty, South Island	-
Te Aratauwhāiti	Whakatāne	Bay of Plenty	Ngāti Ngāinui
Te Aratāwhao	Hawaiki (departing from Bay of Plenty)	Bay of Plenty	-
Te Hoiere	South Island	South Island	Ngāti Kuia
Te Kōhatuwhenua	Taranaki	Taranaki	Ngā Rauru, Ngāti Ruanui
Te Paepae-ki-Rarotonga	Matatā	Bay of Plenty	Ngāti Tuwharetoa
Te Rangimātoru	Ōhiwa	Bay of Plenty	Tuhoe (Ngāi Tūranga), Te Hapū-oneone
Te Rangiuamutu / Tairea	Taranaki	Taranaki	Ngā Rauru, Ngāti Ruanui
Te Rīrino	Boulder Bank (departing from Mahaena)	Taranaki	-
Te Wakaringaringa	Taranaki	Taranaki	Ngā Rauru, Ngāti Ruanui
Te Wakatūwhenua	Cape Rodney	Northland	-
Tinana / Te Māmaru	Tauroa Point	Northland	Te Rarawa, Ngāti Kahu
Tokomaru	Tongapōrutu	Taranaki	Ngāti Maru (Hauraki), Ngāti Maru (Taranaki) / Te Iwi o Maruwharanui, Ngāti Mutunga (Ngāti Mutunga (Taranaki), Ngāti Mutunga o Wharekauri), Ngāti Tama (Ngāti Tama ki Te Tau Ihu, Ngāti Tama ki Te Upoko o Te Ika, Ngāti Tama Kopiri, Ngāti Tama ki Taranaki, Ngāti Tama ki Te Waipounamu), Te Atiawa (Te Atiawa ki Whakarongotai, Te Atiawa Taranaki, Te Ātiawa o Te Waka-a-Māui, Te Atiawa o Te Whanganui-a-Tara), Te Kawerau ā Maki
Tōtara-i-kāria	Mōtītī Island	Bay of Plenty	Ngāti Tuwharetoa
Tūnui-ā-rangi	Motu Kōkako	Auckland, Northland	Ngāi Tāhuhu
Tūwhenua	Bay of Plenty	Bay of Plenty	-
Uruaokapuarangi	Boulder Bank, Clutha River	South Island	Te Kāhui Waitaha, Te Kāhui Tipua, Te Kāhui Roko
Waipapa	Doubtless Bay	Northland	-

== See also ==
- Māori migration canoes
- List of iwi
- Lists of marae in New Zealand
