= Pre-Māori settlement of New Zealand theories =

Pseudohistorical theories of New Zealand settlement

The mainstream view of the Polynesian settlement of New Zealand and the Chatham Islands as representing the end-point of a long chain of island-hopping voyages in the South Pacific.

Since the early 1900s, it has been accepted by archaeologists and anthropologists that Polynesians (who became the Māori) were the first ethnic group to settle in New Zealand (first proposed by Captain James Cook). Before that time and until the 1920s, however, a small group of prominent anthropologists proposed that the Moriori people of the Chatham Islands represented a pre-Māori group of people from Melanesia, who once lived across all of New Zealand and were replaced by the Māori. While this claim was soon disproven by academics, it was widely incorporated into school textbooks during the 20th century, most notably in the School Journal. This theory has been followed by modern claims of a pre-Māori settlement of New Zealand. Today, such theories are considered to be pseudohistorical and negationist by scholars and historians.

Today, speculation about pre-Māori settlers may include conspiracy theories opposing academic research. Some public figures have used these theories to undermine Māori status as first settlers.

== Māori oral traditions ==
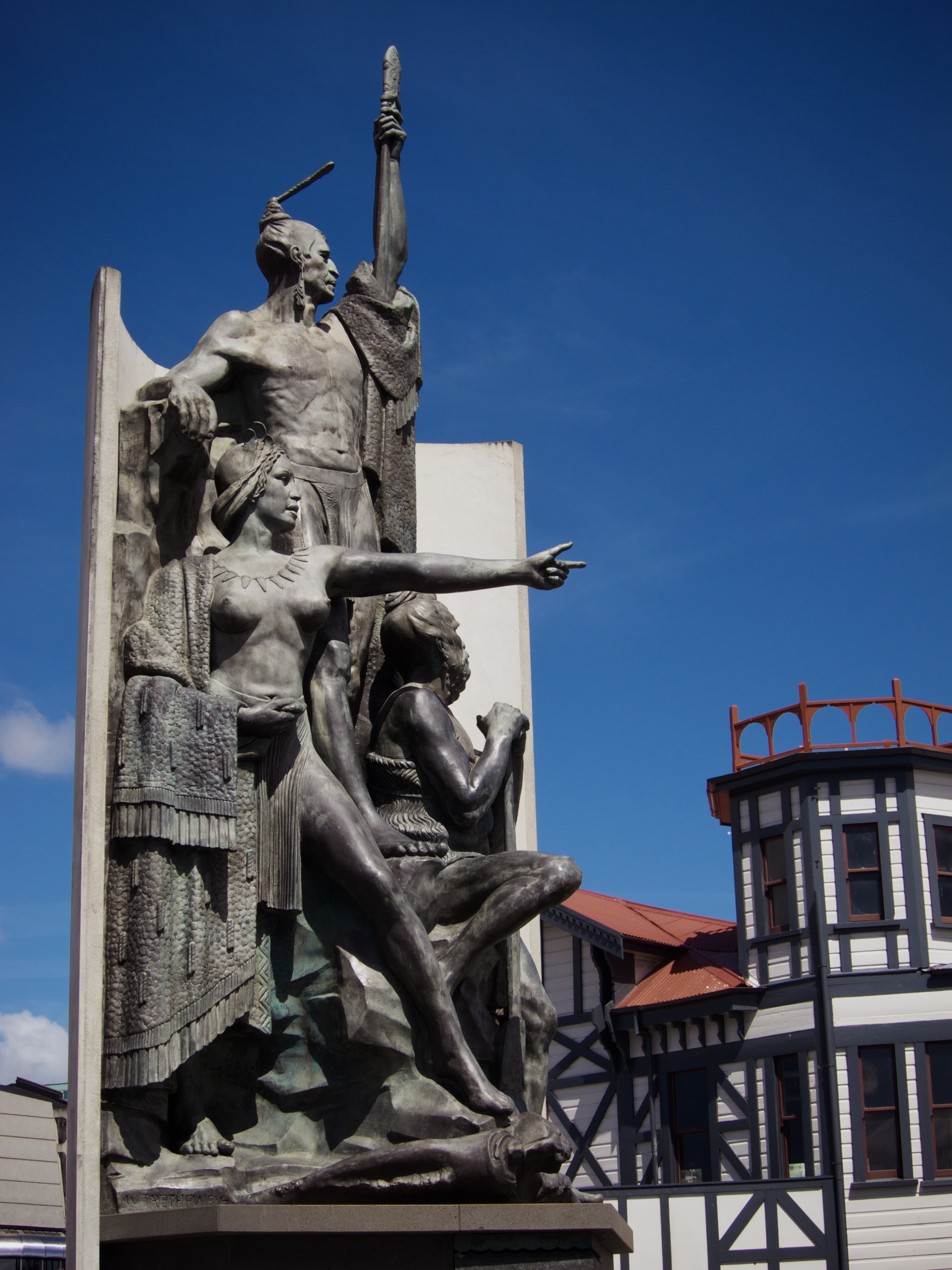
Statue of the legendary explorer Kupe

Māori traditions speak of spirits, fairy folk, giants, and ogres living in parts of New Zealand when Māori arrived. The pale-skinned patupaiarehe are perhaps the most well-known, of which Ngāti Kura, Ngāti Korakorako, and Ngāti Tūrehu are said to be sub-groupings. In oral tradition, patupaiarehe taught weaving and net-making to the Māori, and could not come out during the day. Ponaturi were similar in that they could not tolerate sunlight, so they lived in the ocean.

In south Westland, Kāti Māhaki ki Makaawhio's Te Tauraka Waka a Maui Marae is named in honour of a tradition stating that Māui landed his canoe in Bruce Bay when he arrived in New Zealand. In a myth collected from Lake Ellesmere / Te Waihora, Māui threw a giant to the sea and buried him underneath a mountain to create the area around Banks Peninsula.

Kupe and Ngahue were both contemporaries famous for exploring New Zealand before notable migration voyages began. The latter discovered pounamu, the former introduced the first dogs (kurī) and created Lake Grassmere / Kapara Te Hau to drown Te Kāhui Tipua – who were described as 'giants' or 'ogres' living in Marlborough at the time. Both Kupe and Ngahue returned to Hawaiki, though Ngahue came back with the Arawa after a war with Uenuku.

Other Māori traditions exclude the existence of other humans in New Zealand upon their arrival. A well-known story is how Māui fished up the North Island out of the Pacific Ocean, which Te Rangi Hīroa of Ngāti Mutunga suggests might be a way to say he 'discovered' the island out of the blue, though the rest of the myth is fanciful in saying parts of his canoe became various areas of the two islands.

In the traditions of Ngāi Tahu's Waitaha descendants, Rākaihautū of the Uruaokapuarangi was the first man to set foot in the South Island by digging up the many lakes and waterways and filling them with fish. He brought with him the ancestors of the groups Te Kāhui Tipua, Te Kāhui Roko, and Te Kāhui Waitaha. According to Sir Āpirana Ngata of Ngāti Porou, Rākaihautū did not go south at all, but rather his legend was brought down there. Some accounts may say he is an ancestor of Toi through a daughter that stayed behind in Te Patunuioāio, who himself is an ancestor of Kāti Māmoe, Te Kāhea, Ngāpuhi, Ngāti Rāhiri Tumutumu, and Hāwea in some tellings. Hāwea might have alternatively been a different tribe that arrived on the Kapakitua before or at a similar time to Waitaha before merging with them, with other ancient tribal groupings possibly including the Maero and Rapuwai.

In Ngāi Tūhoe traditions, Toi's 'ancestor' Tīwakawaka was the first to settle the country aboard Te Aratauwhāiti, "but only his name is remembered". A man named Kahukura took Toi's own canoe, the Horouta, and returned to Hawaiki. He sent kūmara back to the new lands with the canoe.

== Early European speculation ==
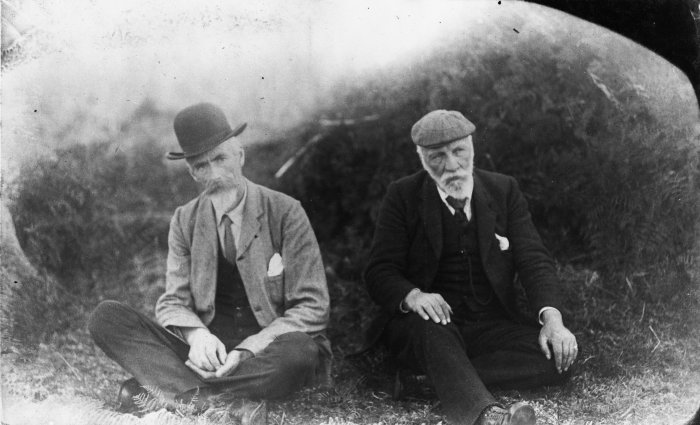
Ethnographers Elsdon Best and Percy Smith, the two most prominent academic proponents of pre-Māori settlement.

Julius von Haast suggested in 1871 that an early Polynesian people who hunted the moa preceded the Māori, who introduced agriculture and lived in small villages. Ideas about Aryan migrations became popular during the 19th century, and these were applied to New Zealand. Edward Tregear's The Aryan Maori (1885) suggested that Aryans from India migrated to southeast Asia and thence to the islands of the Pacific, including New Zealand.

Two works published in 1915, Percy Smith's book The Lore of the Whare-wānanga: Part II and Elsdon Best's journal article "Maori and Maruiwi" in the Transactions of the New Zealand Institute, theorised about pre-Māori settlement. Their work inspired theories that the Māori had displaced a more primitive, at least part-Melanesian pre-Māori population of Moriori in mainland New Zealand – and that the Moriori of the Chatham Islands were the last remnant of this earlier race. Articles in three issues of the New Zealand School Journal in 1916 followed, saying that Moriori preceded Māori people, that they were Melanesian, and that Māori had driven them from mainland New Zealand to refuge in the Chatham Islands. Historian Michael King said that "for hundreds of thousands of New Zealand children, the version of Moriori history carried in the School Journal and other publications which drew from that source, reinforced over 60-odd years by primary school teachers, was the one that lodged in the national imagination". In 2010 three special editions of the School Journal were published to correct the inaccuracies, and the New Zealand government officially apologised for the journal's errors in settlement of the Moriori Waitangi Tribunal claim.

From the 1920s, H. D. Skinner and others overturned the hypothesis about a pre-Māori people by showing the continuation and adaptation of the Archaic (early east Polynesian) culture into the Classic Māori culture. This negated the need for pre-Māori settlement in models of prehistoric New Zealand. Since this time archaeology has become a more professional and scientifically rigorous practice and the model of Polynesians arriving in an uninhabited New Zealand and adapting to its environment has not fundamentally changed.

== Recent revivals of pre-Māori settlement theories ==
Some have continued to speculate that New Zealand was discovered by Melanesians, Celts, Greeks, Egyptians or the Chinese, before the arrival of the Polynesian ancestors of the Māori. Some of these ideas have been supported by politicians, such as former ACT party MP Muriel Newman. Don Brash, formerly leader of the National Party and then of ACT, said in 2017 that Māori were preceded in New Zealand by the Moriori, whom they slaughtered. An earlier proponent of the theory of a pre-Polynesian European settlement of New Zealand was white supremacist and Holocaust denier Kerry Bolton. In his 1987 pamphlet Lords of the Soil, he states that "Polynesia has been occupied by peoples of the Europoid race since ancient times". Other books presenting such theories include The Great Divide: The Story of New Zealand & its Treaty (2012) by journalist Ian Wishart, and To the Ends of the Earth by Maxwell C. Hill, Gary Cook and Noel Hilliam, which claims without evidence that New Zealand was discovered by explorers from ancient Egypt and Greece.

Historians and archaeologists dismiss any such theories. Michael King wrote in his history of New Zealand, "Despite a plethora of amateur theories about Melanesian, South American, Egyptian, Phoenician and Celtic colonisation of New Zealand, there is not a shred of evidence that the first human settlers were anything other than Polynesian", and Richard Hill, professor of New Zealand Studies at Victoria University of Wellington, said in 2012, "Not one of [the theories] has ever passed any remote academic scrutiny." Hugh Laracy of the University of Auckland called them "wild speculation" that has been "thoroughly disposed of by academic specialists". Historian Vincent O'Malley regards the theories as having a political element, seeking to cast doubt on the status of Māori as the first people of New Zealand and as Treaty of Waitangi partners. Amateur archaeologist Garry Law regards the theories as having a racist element, seeking to undermine Waitangi Tribunal claims.

=== Claims of evidence ===
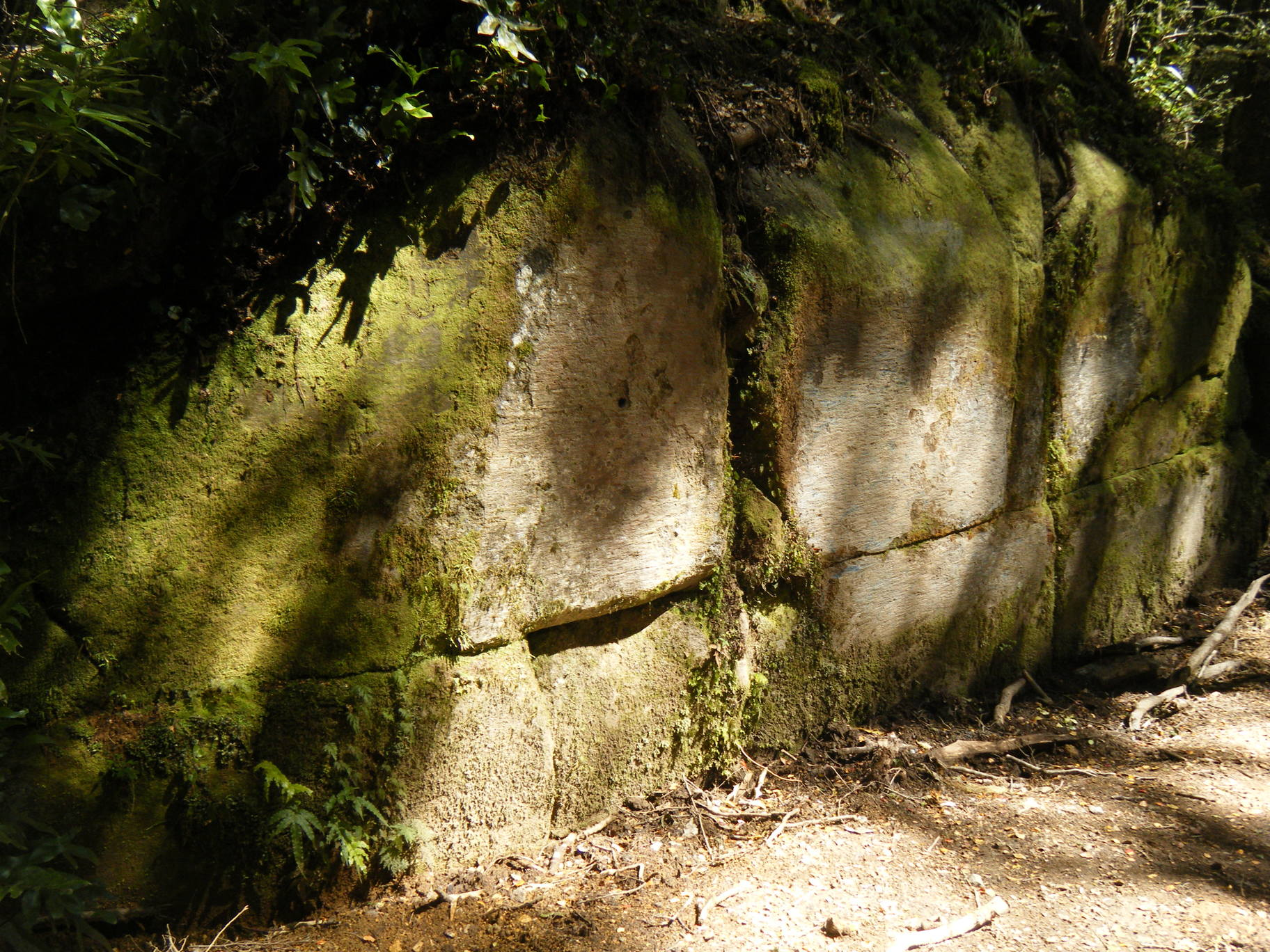
The Kaimanawa Wall, a natural outcrop of ignimbrite with regular joint sets, which are interpreted by some to be man-made

A feature that has been put forward as evidence of pre-Polynesian settlers is the Kaimanawa Wall, which some claim is a remnant of ancient human construction that the Māori could not have built because they did not build with stone in such a way. The wall formation was inspected by an archaeologist and a geologist. Neither saw evidence of a human origin and they concluded the formation is a natural ignimbrite outcrop formed 330,000 years ago.

Archaeologist Neville Ritchie of the New Zealand Department of Conservation observed "matching micro-irregularities along the joints." This indicated that the blocks in the wall were too perfectly matched. He also observed the joints were neither straight nor truly horizontal nor perpendicular, indicating the joint alignments were too poorly constructed. Ritchie concluded the blocks are a natural formation based on the presence of matching micro-irregularities in blocks and imperfect joint alignment.

Peter Wood, a geologist of the Institute of Geological and Nuclear Sciences, inspected the blocks and concluded they are natural fractures in "jointed Rangitaiki ignimbrite, a 330,000 year old volcanic rock that is common in the Taupō Volcanic Zone." Both vertical and horizontal joints are common. Fractures in the Rangitaiki ignimbrite formed when it cooled and contracted after flowing into place during an eruption.

Boulders that were originally on a hill in Silverdale, Auckland, have been argued by Martin Doutré in a self-published 1999 book to be artefacts left by a pre-Polynesian Celtic population, who according to the theory came to be known as the patupaiarehe, and used the boulders as part of a system spanning around the area, used for calendar tracking and survey functions. History professor Kerry Howe described Doutre as "a self-styled 'archaeo-astronomer' who argues that certain configurations of stones in the New Zealand landscape are remnants of mathematically advanced astronomical devices built by ancient Celts who had links with the builders of Stonehenge and the Great Pyramid." Bruce Hayward, a geologist, says the boulders formed 70 million years ago on the seabed, which was pushed up above the sea by natural forces.

Other supposed structures and creations of pre-Polynesian settlers are described as the Waipoua 'stone city', the 'Waitapu Valley (Maunganui Bluff) solar observatory' including Puketapu hill and a mountain at Hokianga, a 'stone village' in the Tapapakanga Regional Park, and all manner of petroglyphs and carvings found throughout the islands. Most of these ideas are propounded by Doutré.

In 2017, journalist Mike Barrington published a lengthy piece in the Northern Advocate claiming evidence that a pre-Māori Celtic population existed in the modern-day Northland Region, thanks to the efforts of amateur archaeologist Noel Hilliam. Barrington reported that Hilliam had excavated two skulls and sent them to "Edinburgh University", where an unnamed forensic pathologist had examined them and decided that they had Welsh origins. When contacted by Vice, the University of Edinburgh denied this, and responded that "nobody [here] knows anything about this ... we are not aware of any academic from the University of Edinburgh having contributed to this project." Barrington and Hilliam were largely ridiculed for their claims, particularly for the forensic facial reconstructions in the article, and for Hilliam's insistence that he had found a "distinctively Welsh skull". Māori questioned whether Hilliam had robbed Māori urupā (burial sites) of the skulls. In New Zealand, it is illegal to disturb or destroy an archaeological site, and can result in substantial fines and a criminal conviction. Heritage New Zealand investigated how Hilliam had obtained the skulls and whether he had sent human remains out of New Zealand, but found no evidence beyond his claims to have done so.

== See also ==
- Archaeology of New Zealand
- Māori history
- Moehau
- Pseudoarchaeology

== Sources ==
- Howe, K. R. (2008) [1st ed. 2003]. The Quest for Origins: Who First Discovered and Settled New Zealand and the Pacific Islands? (Rev. ed.). Penguin Books. ISBN 9780143008453.
- King, Michael (2003). The Penguin History of New Zealand. Penguin Books. ISBN 0-14-301867-1.
