= Waipapa (canoe) =

- Great Māori migration waka
- Landed at: Doubtless Bay
- Settled at: Northland

In Māori tradition, Waipapa was one of the great ocean-going, voyaging canoes that was used in the migrations that settled Northland of Aotearoa (New Zealand). The captains were Kaiwhetu and Wairere, who landed the waka in Doubtless Bay.

The exact landing site of the Waipapa is contested. Various accounts place the landing point at Rangiaowhia, Taipa, Oruru, or Karikari Peninsula.

The captain asked his crew to take tawapou log rollers off the canoe, which had been carried from Hawaiki, and plant them on the slopes of a nearby hill. From the rollers grew a grove of tawapou trees that today serve as a memorial of the arrival of the canoe.

== See also ==
- List of Māori waka
