= Rākaihautū =

Captain of the Uruaokapuarangi canoe

- Born: 9th century? Eastern Polynesia
- Spouse: Waiariki-o-āio
- Children: Te Rakihouia; Te Uhi-tataraiakoa

Rākaihautū was the captain of the Uruaokapuarangi canoe (waka) and a Polynesian ancestor of various iwi, most famously of Waitaha and other southern groups, though he is also known in the traditions of Taitokerau and in those of Rarotonga.

In Māori traditions, once Rākaihautū landed the Uruaokapuarangi at the top of the South Island, he moved southward and dug up many of the island's major lakes using a magical kō (digging stick), filling them with food for his many descendants.

== Origin ==
Rākaihautū originally sailed with his wife Waiariki-o-āio, their son Te Rakihouia, (Note: Spelled Rokohuia by Sir Tipene O'Regan in Waitangai: Maori & Pakeha Perspectives of the Treaty of Waitangi.) and their people from Te-patunui-o-āio (Note: Another name for Hawaiki, sometimes recorded as Patunui-o-waio.) aboard the Uruaokapuarangi canoe over 34 generations ago. The crew included some of Rākaihautū's kin who were of the tribes Te Kāhui Tipua, Te Kāhui Roko, and Te Kāhui Waitaha. Rākaihautū's daughter Te Uhi-tataraiakoa stayed behind in Te-patunui-o-āio.

On the journey to the South Island, the heavens and the ocean blocked the canoe's path until Rākaihautū chanted a karakia and cut a passage with his adze. He eventually landed the Uruaokapuarangi at Nelson, on the top of the South Island.

== Exploration ==
From Nelson, Rākaihautū and his wife separated from Te Rakihouia and began to explore the Southern Alps. Te Rakihouia and Te Kāhui Waitaha took the canoe and continued down the east coast, eventually landing it near the Clutha River.

In the tradition of Ngā Puna Wai Karikari o Rākaihautū, Rākaihautū dug out the large lakes from Lake Rotoiti, Lake Rotoroa, and Rangitahi in the north to Lake Te Anau and Lake Manapouri in the south. For this purpose, he used a digging stick named Tūwhakarōria. Upon reaching Foveaux Strait, he then travelled back up along the east coast, reunited with Te Rakihouia, and settled in Banks Peninsula, where he thrust his stick into a hill called Pūhai above Akaroa Harbour, renaming it (the stick) to Tuhiraki.

External videos
- Rākaihautū and the creation of Lake Pūkaki on Vimeo (2 mins 43 s)

The stick became the rocky peak that is known to Pākehā as Mount Bossu.

Specific lakes that Rākaihautū is credited with digging include Lake Tekapo, Lake Pukaki, Lake Ōhau, Lake Hāwea, Lake Wānaka, Lake Wakatipu, Whakatipu Waitī, Te Aitarakihi near Washdyke, Lake Ellesmere / Te Waihora, and Lake Forsyth.

== Legacy ==
Namesakes of Rākaihautū include Te Pataka o Rākaihautū (The Storehouse of Rākaihautū) and Te Kete Ika o Rākaihautū (The Fish Basket of Rākaihautū).

He is most famously known as an ancestor of Waitaha, (Note: Waitaha's namesake(s) lived around 12 generations after Te Uhi-tataraiakoa.) though the founders of Kāti Māmoe (Note: Kāti Māmoe's namesake lived around eight generations after Waitaha, and originated in the Hastings District in the North Island.) and the lesser known Te Kāhea, (Note: Te Kāhea's namesake lived around 9 generations after Te Uhi-tataraiakoa.) (Note: Ngāi Tahu's ancestress Tūhaitara married a Hastings local of Kāhea descent. Tūhaitara herself had some Ngāti Māmoe ancestry.) iwi are both said to be descendants of Te Uhi-tataraiakoa's great grandson Toi. Ngāpuhi and Ngāti Rāhiri Tumutumu are also said to be descended from Toi through the ancestor Rāhiri. (Note: Rāhiri lived around 20 generations after Te Uhi-tataraiakoa.) The ancient Hāwea tribe is sometimes said to descend from Toi, (Note: When Ngāti Māmoe crossed to the South Island, all ancient tribes (Te Kāhui Tipua, Te Kāhui Roko, Te Rapuwai, Ngāti Hawea, and Ngāti Wairangi) that had been present there were collectively called Waitaha, including the original group with that name. This also happened with Kāti Māmoe when Ngāi Tahu migrated after them; of which the previous groups are now often considered sub-groupings.) or they could have arrived on their own canoe—the Kapakitua under Taiehu's captaincy—earlier than the Uruaokapuarangi. Kapakitua might have otherwise been the name of Rākaihautū's adze onboard the Uruaokapuarangi when it arrived to the South Island.

== See also ==
- Kupe
- Ngahue
