= Tūwhenua =

Māori ocean going canoe

- Great Māori migration waka
- Settled at: Bay of Plenty

In Māori tradition, Tūwhenua was one of the great ocean-going, voyaging canoes (or waka) that were used in the migrations that settled New Zealand. The waka is linked to Bay of Plenty iwi. Some Māori from Ngatiira, of Ōpōtiki, state that Tamatea came from Hawaiki in Tūwhenua, and that he found a tribe of aborigines living at Motu on his arrival.

== See also ==
- List of Māori waka
