= Mānuka (canoe) =

Māori voyaging canoe

- Great Māori migration waka
- Commander: Rongo-i-tua

In Māori tradition, Mānuka was one of the great ocean-going, voyaging canoes that was used in the migrations that settled the South Island of Aotearoa (New Zealand). The canoe is said to have travelled to the Polynesian homeland of Hawaiki to procure kūmara, a type of sweet potato. Although the Mānuka returned with kūmara, most accounts state that efforts to germinate and grow the tubers it brought back ended in failure.

== Origin story ==
In Ngā Waka o Neherā (2009), Jeff Evans writes that Mānuka was built from the same tōtara tree as Āraiteuru, her sister waka (canoe). There was a dispute between Tua-kakariki, who first found the log on the beach, and Rongo-i-tua, a visitor who was eager to return home. To stake his claim, Rongo-i-tua had deposited his own excrement on the log while Tua-kakariki was away trying to assemble a work party to move it.

Rongo-i-tua was awarded the log and got help from the Kahui-tipua people to build a canoe, promising to lead an expedition to bring back more dried kūmara. The first canoe to be built was called Mānuka ('ma' = claim possession, 'nuka' = deceive) for the way he claimed the log. Once the canoe had been completed, the Kahui-tipua claimed it for their own and travelled to Hawaiki to acquire kūmara. However, once they returned, they were unable to successfully cultivate it.

== Explanations ==
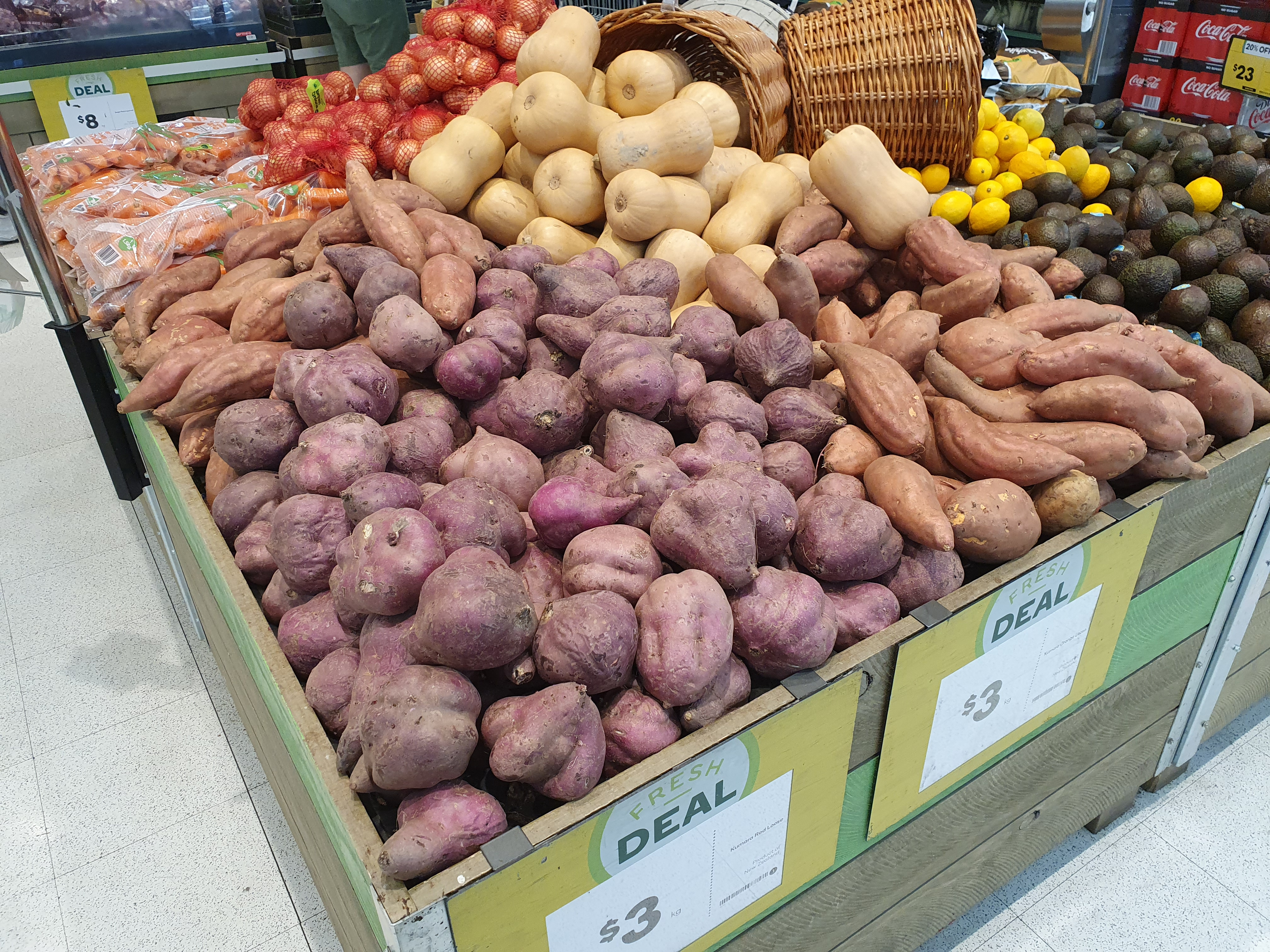
Varieties of modern-day kūmara

One version of the story is that the kūmara failed to grow because the South Island was too cold. According to a Murihiku account, the crop rotted in the ground because ritual incantations were not performed.

Other accounts state that the Mānuka had brought back only a "scraggly few" plants. Subsequent canoe voyages were tasked with bringing back the "better kinds" of kūmara. In one such narrative, Rongo-i-tua, or Roko, set forth from Hawaiki on the Āraiteuru, but was caught in a storm which pushed the kūmara overboard. After washing up on shore, the vegetables were petrified to form the Moeraki Boulders.

== See also ==
- List of Māori waka
