= Tōtara-i-kāria =

- Great Māori migration waka

In Māori tradition, Tōtara-i-kāria was one of the great ocean-going, voyaging canoes (or waka) that was used in the migrations that settled New Zealand. The waka is linked to the Bay of Plenty region. Legend has it that this was the waka taken by the priest Ngātoroirangi back to Hawaiki; upon arrival, he fought a battle at Ihumotomotokia and Whatatiri, against the chief Manaia. He defeated Manaia, and then returned to his pā (fortification) in New Zealand, on Mōtītī Island in the Bay of Plenty. However, the survivors of Manaia's tribe soon arrived in a fleet of canoes to seek revenge. Ngātoroirangi chanted incantations whipping up a storm that destroyed them.

== See also ==
- List of Māori waka
