= Ōkoki =

- Great Māori migration waka

In Māori tradition, Ōkoki was one of the great ocean-going, voyaging canoes that was used in the migrations that settled New Zealand. It landed with Kahutara and Taikōria near New Plymouth.

== See also ==
- List of Māori waka
