= Te Aratāwhao =

- Great Māori migration waka

Te Aratāwhao was a Māori waka constructed by early Māori settlers in the Bay of Plenty region of New Zealand. The craft was purpose-built to supply kumara from Hawaiki to New Zealand. Captained by Tama-ki-hikurangi, Te Aratāwhao withstood the journey from Whakatāne to Hawaiki. However, Te Aratāwhao and her captain remained in Hawaiki, while the crew returned to New Zealand with the supplies in another canoe, the Mataatua.

== See also ==
- List of Māori waka
