= Kāraerae =

- Great Māori migration waka
- Commander: Tamatea-arikinui

Kāraerae was a great migratory waka (canoe) used by early Polynesian settlers in New Zealand according to Māori tradition, in which it is said that after Tamatea-arikinui wrecked the Tākitimu at Te Waewae Bay in Southland, he built the Kāraerae and sailed back to the North Island.

In one Moriori tradition, Te Kāraerae was said to be the first canoe to land at Rēkohu. It was captained by Kahukoha, Rongomaiwhenua, Te Ao, and Puwaitaha – all of Ngāti Kopeka, a branch of Waitaha.

== See also ==
- List of Māori waka
