= Taikōria =

- Great Māori migration waka

In Māori tradition, Taikōria was one of the great ocean-going, voyaging canoes that was used in the migrations that settled New Zealand. Captained by Ruatāmore, the Taikōria landed with the Kahutara and the Ōkoki at Ngāmotu near New Plymouth.

== See also ==
- List of Māori waka
