= Hīnakipākau-o-te-rupe =

- Great Māori migration waka

In Māori tradition, Hīnakipākau-o-te-rupe was one of the great ocean-going, voyaging canoes that was used in the migrations that settled New Zealand. Maori tradition states that two travelers from Hawaiki, Hoaki and Taukata, brought kao (dried sweet potato) with them on Hīnakipākau-o-te-rupe to the Bay of Plenty.

== See also ==
- List of Māori waka
