= Te Rangimātoru =

- Great Māori migration waka

In Māori tradition, Te Rangimātoru was one of the great ocean-going, voyaging canoes that was used in the migrations that settled New Zealand. Te Rangimātoru landed at Ohiwa and was commanded by Hape-ki-tu-manui-o-te-rangi (who later died in the South Island).

== See also ==
- List of Māori waka
