= Tauira =

- Great Māori migration waka

In Māori tradition, Tauira was one of the great ocean-going, voyaging canoes that was used in the migrations that settled New Zealand. Tauira was captained by Mōtataumaitawhiti and landed at Te Kaha in the eastern Bay of Plenty. Panenehu and Te Whānau-ā-Apanui iwi trace their ancestry back to Tauira.

== See also ==
- List of Māori waka
