= Ōtūrereao =

Maōri canoe used in the settlement of New Zealand

- Great Māori migration waka

In Māori tradition, Ōtūrereao was one of the great ocean-going, voyaging canoes that was used in the migrations that settled New Zealand. It was piloted by Tairongo or Taikehu and landed at Ōhiwa.

== See also ==
- List of Māori waka
