= Tūnui-ā-rangi =

- Great Māori migration waka

In Māori tradition, Tūnui-ā-rangi was one of the great ocean-going, voyaging canoes (or waka) that was used in the migrations that settled New Zealand. The waka is linked to the Ngāi Tāhuhu iwi of the Auckland and Northland regions.

Tūnui-ā-rangi is said to have landed at Piercy Island in the Bay of Islands. It then traveled south to Ngunguru and Whangārei.

== See also ==
- List of Māori waka
