= Manuka =

Mānuka (Leptospermum scoparium) is a plant.

Manuka or mānuka may also refer to:

- Manuka, Australian Capital Territory
  - Manuka Oval, a stadium in the above territory
    - Manuka Football Club, a defunct Australian Rules Football club that played in the stadium
- Manuka Primary School in Witheford Heights, North Shore, New Zealand
- Manuka Creek, a locality in Otago, New Zealand
- Mānuka honey, a monofloral honey
- Mānuka (canoe), from Māori tradition
- Manuka State Wayside Park and forest reserve, a park on the Island of Hawaiʻi
- Gentian Manuka (born 1991), Albanian footballer
- SS Manuka, a Union Company cargo ship.
- HMNZS Manuka, a Royal New Zealand Navy minesweeper
