= Aotearoa (disambiguation) =

Aotearoa is the Māori name for New Zealand.

Aotearoa may also refer to:

== Music ==
- "Aotearoa" (anthem), Māori version of "God Defend New Zealand"
- Aotearoa (overture), by Douglas Lilburn
- "Aotearoa" (Jenny Morris song)
- "Aotearoa" (Minuit song)
- "Aotearoa" (Stan Walker song)
- "Aotearoa" (TrinityRoots song)

== People ==
- Aotearoa Mata'u (born 1997), New Zealand rugby union player

== Vehicles ==
- Aotearoa (aircraft), an aircraft that disappeared in 1928 during an attempted trans-Tasman flight
- Aotearoa (canoe), an ocean-going, voyaging canoe used by the Māori
- Aotearoa (yacht), a catamaran that competed in the 2013 America's Cup
- HMNZS Aotearoa, an auxiliary ship of the New Zealand Navy launched in 2019

== Other ==
- Aotearoa (genus), a spider genus
- Aotearoa (meeting house), at Paparoa, New Zealand
- 3400 Aotearoa, a minor planet

== See also ==
- Aotea (disambiguation)
