= Riukākara =

- Great Māori migration waka
- Commander: Pāoa

In Māori tradition, Riukākara was one of the great ocean-going, voyaging canoes that was used in the migrations that settled New Zealand. In the story, Pāoa piloted the waka to land at Mangōnui.

== See also ==
- List of Māori waka
