= Tahatuna =

Great Māori migration waka

- Great Māori migration waka

In Māori tradition, Tahatuna was one of the great ocean-going, voyaging canoes that was used in the migrations that settled New Zealand.

== See also ==
- List of Māori waka
