= Tāwhirirangi =

- Great Māori migration waka
- Commander: Ngāhue
- Landed at: Hokianga

In Māori tradition, Tāwhirirangi was one of the great ocean-going, voyaging canoes that was used in the migrations that settled New Zealand. Tāwhirirangi was captained by Ngāhue, and originally landed in the Hokianga before heading to the South Island. Ngāhue is said to have then discovered pounamu.

Friedrich Ratzel in The History of Mankind, when discussing legend preserved in song, reported in 1896 that a chief by the name of Ngahue was driven to flight by a civil war which devastated Hawaiki. After a long journey, he reached New Zealand and returned to Hawaiki with pieces of greenstone and the bones of a giant bird.

== See also ==
- List of Māori waka
