= Waitaha (South Island iwi) =

Māori iwi (tribe) in Aotearoa New Zealand

- Iwi (tribe) in Māoridom
- Rohe (region): South Island
- Waka (canoe): Uruaokapuarangi

Waitaha is an early Māori iwi who inhabited the South Island of New Zealand. They were largely absorbed via marriage and conquest – first by the Ngāti Māmoe and then by Ngāi Tahu – from the 16th century onward. Today those of Waitaha descent are represented by the Ngāi Tahu iwi. Like Ngāi Tahu today, Waitaha was itself a collection of various ancient iwi. Kāti Rākai was said to be one of Waitaha's hapū.

== History ==
=== Origins ===
Some of Waitaha's earliest ancestors are traditionally traced as arrivals from Te Patunui-o-āio (Note: Another name for Hawaiki, sometimes recorded as Patunui-o-waio.) in Eastern Polynesia aboard the Uruaokapuarangi canoe (waka), of which Rākaihautū had been the captain. He was accompanied by his wife and son, Waiariki-o-āio and Te Rakihouia, (Note: Spelled Rokohuia by Sir Tipene O'Regan in Waitangi: Maori & Pakeha Perspectives of the Treaty of Waitangi.) the renowned tohunga kōkōrangi (astronomer) Matiti, Waitaa, (Note: Sometimes recorded as Waitaha.) and other kin of the Te Kāhui Tipua, Te Kāhui Roko, and Te Kāhui Waitaha iwi. When genealogies are interpreted with 25–30 years' worth of lifespan for at least 34 generations, these people are calculated to have lived in or around the 9th century at the latest, but this is not an entirely reliable way to trace earlier occupants of New Zealand.

A traditional story tells how Rākaihautū used Kapakitua, his adze, (Note: Some traditions say that Kapakitua was the name for Ngāti Hawea's canoe that arrived under Taiehu's captaincy earlier than Uruaokapuarangi, or at the same time.) to cut a path through heavy fog on the canoe's voyage. Other traditional stories such as the story of Ngā Puna Wai Karikari o Rākaihautū (roughly translated as "The Flowing Water Diggings of Rākaihautū"), credit Rākaihautū with travelling down the Southern Alps to Foveaux Strait from Boulder Bank, digging up many great lakes and waterways with Tūwhakarōria – his magical kō (digging stick), and filling them with food as he went. Te Rakihouia and Waitaa also journeyed down along the east coast as far south as the Clutha River. The two groups met up near the Waitaki River, where the Uruaokapuarangi is still said to lie as part of the riverbed today. The party then moved back northwards to live at Banks Peninsula, where Rākaihautū renamed Tūwhakarōria to Tuhiraki, thrusting it into a hill called Pūhai where it turned into the rocky peak known to Pākehā today as Mount Bossu. According to Sir Āpirana Ngata, it is "very doubtful" that Rākaihautū went south at all, saying specifically in an audio recording with John Te Herekiekie Grace:

He landed in the north. Whether he went south is very doubtful. They localized him in the South Island because the people who knew the position moved south. Well, that was somewhere about the ninth century.

— Āpirana Ngata, The Journal of the Polynesian Society LIX: The Io Cult – Early Migration – Puzzle of the Canoes (1950)

=== Rākaihautū's descendants ===
A daughter of Rākaihautū, Te Uhi-tataraiakoa, stayed behind in Te Patunui-o-āio, and became the great-grandmother of Toi. Eight generations after Toi there lived Waitaha-nui and after him Waitaha-araki, after whom there came Hāwea-i-te-raki, (Note: The founder of Ngāti Hawea.) and finally seven generations later lived Hotumāmoe from Hastings, the founding ancestor of Ngāti Māmoe. In addition, Te Kāhea was a fifth generation descendant of Toi, and Rāhiri was also a 16th generation descendant. Tūhaitara from Hastings, a famed Ngāi Tahu ancestress, was said to have some Ngāti Māmoe ancestry. Her husband Marukore was a local with Te Kāhea ancestry. Waiwhero and Hekeia were Waitaha chiefs, with Te Anau being the latter's granddaughter and Aparima being his mother. Otaraia was the name of another chief.

Waitaha's pā included O whitianga te ra ("place of the shining sun"), close to the southern end of Lake Te Anau a site at the Taerutu Lagoon near Woodend, a site at the mouth of Mata-au, a site in the Oamaru area, and a site around Lake Wakatipu.

At the time Ngāti Māmoe migrated to the South Island from Te Whanganui-a-Tara about the 16th century, all the South Island's ancient iwi including the original Waitaha, Te Kāhui Tipua, Te Kāhui Roko, Te Rapuwai, Ngāti Hawea, and Ngāti Wairangi were all collectively grouped together as Waitaha. This happened again to Kāti Māmoe when Ngāi Tahu conquered the South Island in the 17th and 18th centuries. In October 2014, the remnants of a canoe, the Papanui waka, was found in the sand dunes of Papanui Inlet. Dating to the 15th century, likely contemporary with the Waitaha iwi's occupation of the area, it is the second oldest known waka in New Zealand.

=== Latter day claim ===
In 1995, a book by controversial author Barry Brailsford, Song of Waitaha: The Histories of a Nation, claimed that the ancestors of a "Nation of Waitaha" were the first inhabitants of New Zealand, three groups of people of different races, two of light complexion and one of dark complexion, who had arrived in New Zealand from an unspecified location in the Pacific Ocean, 67 generations before the book appeared. They lived peacefully until the Māori arrived in New Zealand and destroyed their culture, except for a remnant of the Waitaha, who were the Moriori of the Chatham Islands. He claimed that knowledge of the history of the Waitaha was kept secret, until he had visions and the knowledge was revealed to him.

Although a series of further books, web sites and events have addressed these claims, they have been widely disputed and dismissed by scholars. Historian Michael King noted: "There was not a skerrick of evidence – linguistic, artifactual, genetic; no datable carbon or pollen remains, nothing – that the story had any basis in fact. Which would make Waitaha the first people on earth to live in a country for several millennia and leave no trace of their occupation."

== Organisations ==
Several organisations have Waitaha as part of their title, often as a synonym for Canterbury or in a generic "ancient links to the land" sense. Some are:

- Waitaha Cultural Council, Christchurch-based performance group
- Canterbury/Waitaha District Council of the New Zealand Educational Institute
- University of Canterbury (Te Whare Wānanga o Waitaha)

== Notable people ==
- Taare Parata (1865–1918), politician
- Tame Parata (1837–1917), politician
- Bob Whaitiri (1916–1996), community leader and soldier
- Harry Kent (cyclist) (1947–2021), former city councilor and gold medal racing cyclist

== See also ==
- Āraiteuru
- Aoraki / Mount Cook
- Kahukura
- Waitaha penguin
