= Te Moana O Raukawa Māori =

Languages
- Māori language

Te Moana O Raukawa Māori (Cook Strait Māori) and Te Ūpoko o te Ika a Māui Māori (lower North Island Māori) are a Māori iwi from Manawatu, Horowhenua, Kāpiti Coast and Wellington. They include the iwi (tribes) of Rangitāne, Muaūpoko, Ngāti Raukawa, Ngāti Toa, Te Atiawa ki Whakarongotai, Te Āti Awa and Taranaki Whānui ki te Upoko o te Ika.

Rangitāne, Ngāti Toa, and Taranaki (including Te Āti Awa) also have tribal lands in the South Island.
