= Te Rīrino =

- Great Māori migration waka

In Māori tradition, Te Rīrino was one of the great ocean-going, voyaging canoes that was used in the migrations that settled New Zealand. The waka departed from Mahaena and was commanded by Potoru. It originally landed at the Boulder Bank on the Nelson coast, and later sank in the Tasman Sea. Te Rīrino was the only one of the great waka that sank.

== See also ==
- List of Māori waka
