= Te Paepae-ki-Rarotonga =

Mythological canoe

- Great Māori migration waka

In Māori tradition, Te Paepae-ki-Rarotonga was one of the great ocean-going, voyaging canoes that was used in the migrations that settled New Zealand. Te Paepae-ki-Rarotonga was captained by Waitaha-ariki-kore and is said to have landed near Matatā.

== Traditions ==
Waitaha-Ariki-Kore pulled down his house in Rarotonga and used it to build his waka Te Paepae-o-Rarotonga.

He was guided to Aotearoa by two taniwha and made first landfall at the Rurima Islands. He approached the islands at speed and on striking them caused them to break apart. At Rurima he sought water at the spring which bears his name.

From Rurima he then crossed to the mainland landing at Te Awa o te Atua, near Matata, before proceeding past Otaramuturangi to Te Kohika. From here he travelled to the inland of the Bay of Plenty.

Ngatiawa expressly state that Te Paepae-o-Rarotonga arrived before the coming of Mātaatua, and it is said to have been a very tapu craft; hence the place where it lay (The canoe is said to be lying, buried, at Tara-o-muturangi) was used as a burial-place.

Waiataha-ariki-kore married Hineteariki of Hapuoneone who had her pā at Otamarakau and inland to Waitahanui. Their daughter was Hahuru the mother of Tuwharetoa i te Aupouri.

According to Colonel Gudgeon, the Rarotongan natives have a tradition concerning a canoe called Te Paepae-o-Rarotonga.

== See also ==
- List of Māori waka
