= Arahura (canoe) =

Divine canoe in Māori mythology

- Great Māori migration waka
- Iwi: Ngāi Tahu
- Settled at: South Island

Arahura was a divine canoe (waka) made of pounamu in Ngāi Tahu's Māori mythology.

The chiefs who travelled to New Zealand in her were Peki(te)tahua, Rongokahe, Rangitatau, Hineraho, Te Rangitamau, Taewhenua, Te Mikimiki (Te Mingimingi), Atua-whakanihoniho, Te Atua-whakataratara, and Whakarewa. Arahura may have also been the name of the atua that was brought along with the canoe.

== See also ==
- Āraiteuru
- Ngahue
- Tākitimu
- Uruaokapuarangi
