= Arahura (disambiguation) =

Arahura was former Interisland Line ferry.

Arahura may also refer to:

- Arahura (canoe)
- Arahura (twin screw ship)
- Arahura Marae, a tribal meeting ground
- Arahura River
