= Bob Whaitiri =

New Zealand guide, soldier, and community leader

Robert Agrippa Moengaroa Whaitiri (9 May 1916 – 11 July 1996) was a notable New Zealand guide, soldier, launch and tug master, factory manager, and community leader. Of Māori descent, he identified with the Ngāi Tahu, Ngāti Mamoe and Waitaha iwi. He was born in Bluff, Southland, New Zealand in 1916.
