= Ngāi Te Ohuake =

Māori iwi (tribe) in Aotearoa (New Zealand)

- Iwi (tribe) in Māoridom
- Rohe (region): Hawke's Bay, Manawatū-Whanganui
- Waka (canoe): Tākitimu
- Website: mokaipateaclaims.maori.nz

Ngāi Te Ohuake is a Māori iwi (tribe) centred around Tōrere in the central North Island. It is one of four iwi in the Mōkai Pātea confederation, along with Ngāti Hauiti, Ngāti Tamakōpiri, and Ngāti Whitikaupeka. The iwi claims descent from Kahungunu, a son of Tamatea Pōkai Whenua and his wife Iwipupu. As such, Ngāi Te Ohuake trace their origins to the Tākitimu waka (canoes).

The iwi's rohe (tribal area) and tribal lands are situated east of Waiouru, Moawhango, Taihape and Mangaweka, to the south of the North Island's Central Plateau. It includes parts of the Hastings District in Hawke's Bay and the Rangitīkei District in Manawatū-Whanganui.

== See also ==
- List of Maori iwi
