= Te Wairoa (iwi) =

Māori iwi (tribe) in New Zealand

- Iwi (tribe) in Māoridom
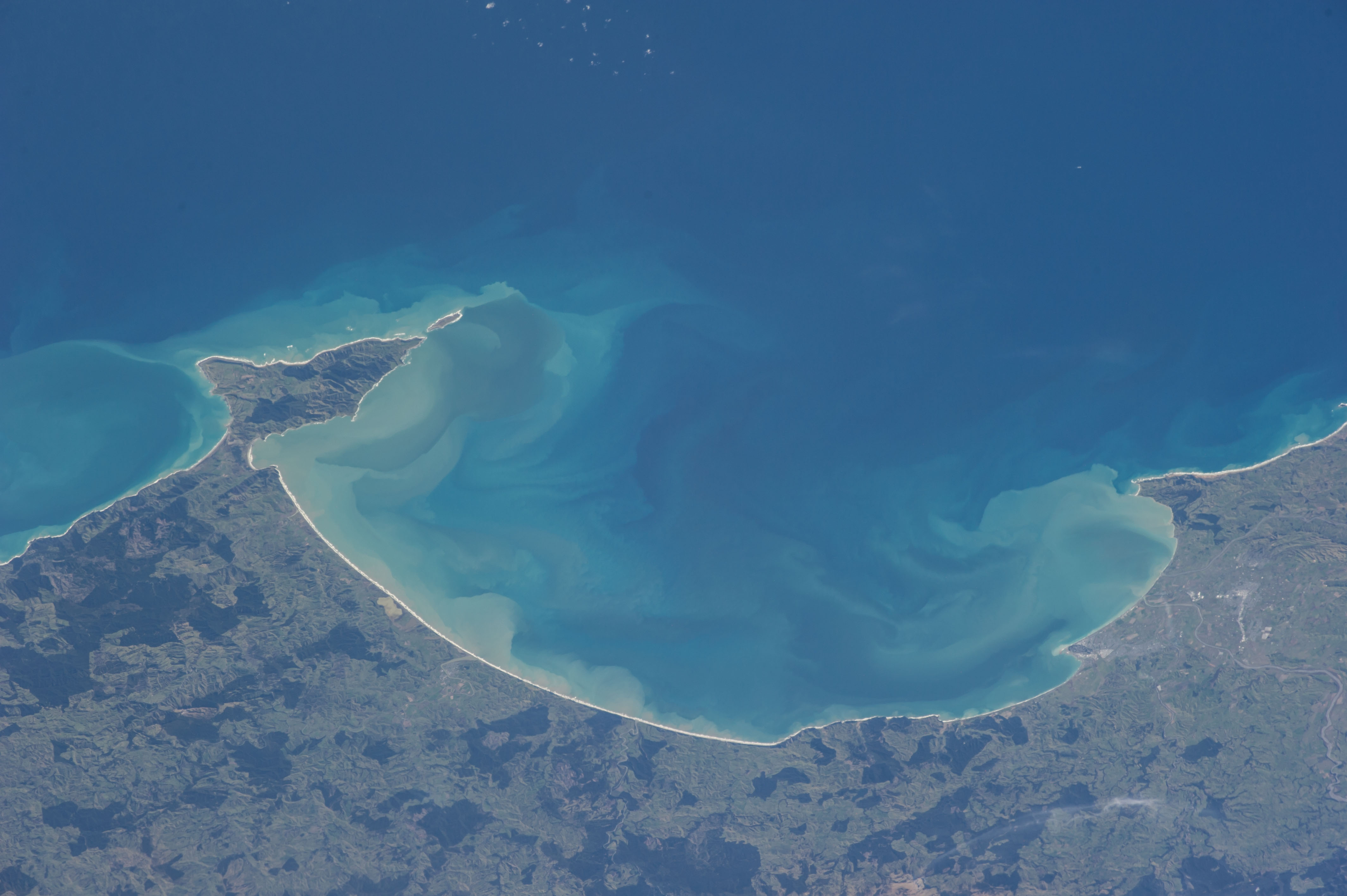
- Rohe (region): Wairoa District
- Waka (canoe): Kurahaupo, Tākitimu
- Awa (river): Wairoa, Waiau
- Population: 25,500 (2013)
- Website: www.ttotw.iwi.nz

Te Wairoa is a group of Ngāti Kahungunu and Ngāti Rongomaiwahine Māori hapū of New Zealand who have joined for Treaty of Waitangi settlement negotiations.

== See also ==
- List of Māori iwi
