= Te Aratauwhāiti =

- Great Māori migration waka

In Māori tradition, Te Aratauwhāiti was one of the great ocean-going, voyaging canoes that was used in the migrations that settled New Zealand. Te Aratauwhāiti was captained by Tīwakawaka, and was one of the earliest waka to reach New Zealand, making landfall at Whakatāne.

== See also ==
- List of Māori waka
