= Uruaokapuarangi =

- Great Māori migration waka
- Commander: Rākaihautū, Te Rakihouia
- Landed at: Boulder Bank; Clutha River
- Iwi: Te Kāhui Tipua; Te Kāhui Roko; Te Kāhui Waitaha
- Settled at: Waitaki River

Uruaokapuarangi (also Te Waka a Rangi; often known simply as Uruao) was one of the great ocean-going, voyaging canoes (waka) that was used in the migrations that settled the South Island according to Māori tradition.

Uruaokapuarangi is linked to many southern iwi, first landing near Nelson. The waka was captained by Rākaihautū, who was accompanied by his wife Waiariki-o-āio, their son Te Rakihouia, (Note: Spelled Rokohuia by Sir Tipene O'Regan in Waitangai: Maori & Pakeha Perspectives of the Treaty of Waitangi.) and a man named Matiti.

== Origins ==
Originally, Uruaokapuarangi was said to belong to a chief from Te Patunuioāio (Note: Another name for Hawaiki, sometimes recorded as Patunui-o-waio.) named Taitewhenua. He decided to give the canoe to the renowned tohunga kōkōrangi (astronomer) Matiti, who then gave it to Rākaihautū and encouraged him to use it to explore new lands.

In the 9th century, Rākaihautū, accompanied by his wife Waiariki-o-āio, their son Te Rakihouia, Matiti, and other kin of the Te Kāhui Tipua, Te Kāhui Roko, and Te Kāhui Waitaha tribes, set sail across the Pacific Ocean in search of new land.

== Voyage and arrival ==
On the journey to the South Island the heavens and the ocean blocked the canoe's path, until Rākaihautū chanted a karakia and cut a passage with his adze, Kapakitua. (Note: Some traditions say that Kapakitua was the name for Ngāti Hawea's canoe that arrived under Taiehu earlier than Uruaokapuarangi, or at the same time.) He eventually landed the Uruaokapuarangi at Boulder Bank, Nelson, at the top of the South Island.

From Nelson, Rākaihautū and his wife separated from Te Rakihouia and began to explore the Southern Alps down to Foveaux Strait, digging out the island's great lakes and waterways as he went. Te Rakihouia and Waitaa (or Waitaha) took the canoe and continued down the east coast, naming the cliffs at Kaikōura Te Whatakai-o-Rakihouia (The Food Storehouse of Rakihouia) and eventually finding a lake at Banks Peninsula now called Lake Ellesmere / Te Waihora, naming its coastline Kā Poupou O Te Rakihouia (The Eel Weirs Of Te Rakihouia). The canoe continued, and eventually landed at the mouth of the Clutha River, which they named Matauu (or Mata-au).

Both parties moved back up the east coast from the southerly points that they each landed, meeting at Waihao, near the Waitaki River where the canoe now makes up part of the riverbed at Wai Kakahi (near Glenavy).

== See also ==
- List of Māori waka
- Matahourua
- Tāwhirirangi
