= Aotea =

Aotea may refer to:

- Aotea, Māori name for Great Barrier Island
- Aotea (canoe), in which Māori migrated to New Zealand
- Aotea, New Zealand, a suburb of Porirua
- Aotea Centre, Auckland
- Aotea Harbour, in the Waikato region
- Aotea Lagoon, in Porirua
- Aotea Square, in Auckland
- Aotea Station, officially the Te Waihorotiu railway station, in Auckland

== See also ==
- Aotearoa (disambiguation)
