= Aotearoa (canoe) =

- Great Māori migration waka

In Māori tradition, Aotearoa was one of the great ocean-voyaging canoes that were used in the migrations that settled New Zealand. Aotearoa was captained by Mokotōrea or Mokoterea. It landed at Aotea on the Tasman Sea coast of the Waikato and was buried there.

== See also ==
- List of Māori waka
- Māori migration canoes
