= Oruru =

Oruru-Parapara
- Interactive map of Oruru-Parapara
- Coordinates: 35.016°S 173.418°E
- Country: New Zealand
- Region: Northland Region
- District: Far North District
- Ward: Te Hiku
- Community: Te Hiku
- Subdivision: Whatuwhiwhi; Doubtless Bay
- Electorates: Northland; Te Tai Tokerau

Government
  - Territorial Authority: Far North District Council
  - Regional council: Northland Regional Council
  - Mayor of Far North: Moko Tepania
  - Northland MP: Grant McCallum
  - Te Tai Tokerau MP: Mariameno Kapa-Kingi

Area
  - Total: 103.35 km^{2} (39.90 sq mi)

Population (June 2025)
  - Total: 980
  - Density: 9.5/km^{2} (25/sq mi)

Oruru is a populated place in the Oruru River valley in Peria, Northland, New Zealand. It is part of the Oruru-Parapara statistical area on the southern side of Doubtless Bay. State Highway 10 runs across the northern part. In addition to Oruru, the statistical area includes the localities of Aurere, Parapara and Paranui. The small settlements of Taipa-Mangonui are north and northeast of the area and are not included in it.

The Oruru Valley was the location of many pā sites and is of archaeological and cultural importance. The valley had two part-time schools in 1879 A school continued to flourish at Oruru in 1947, and there was also a school at Parapara at that time.

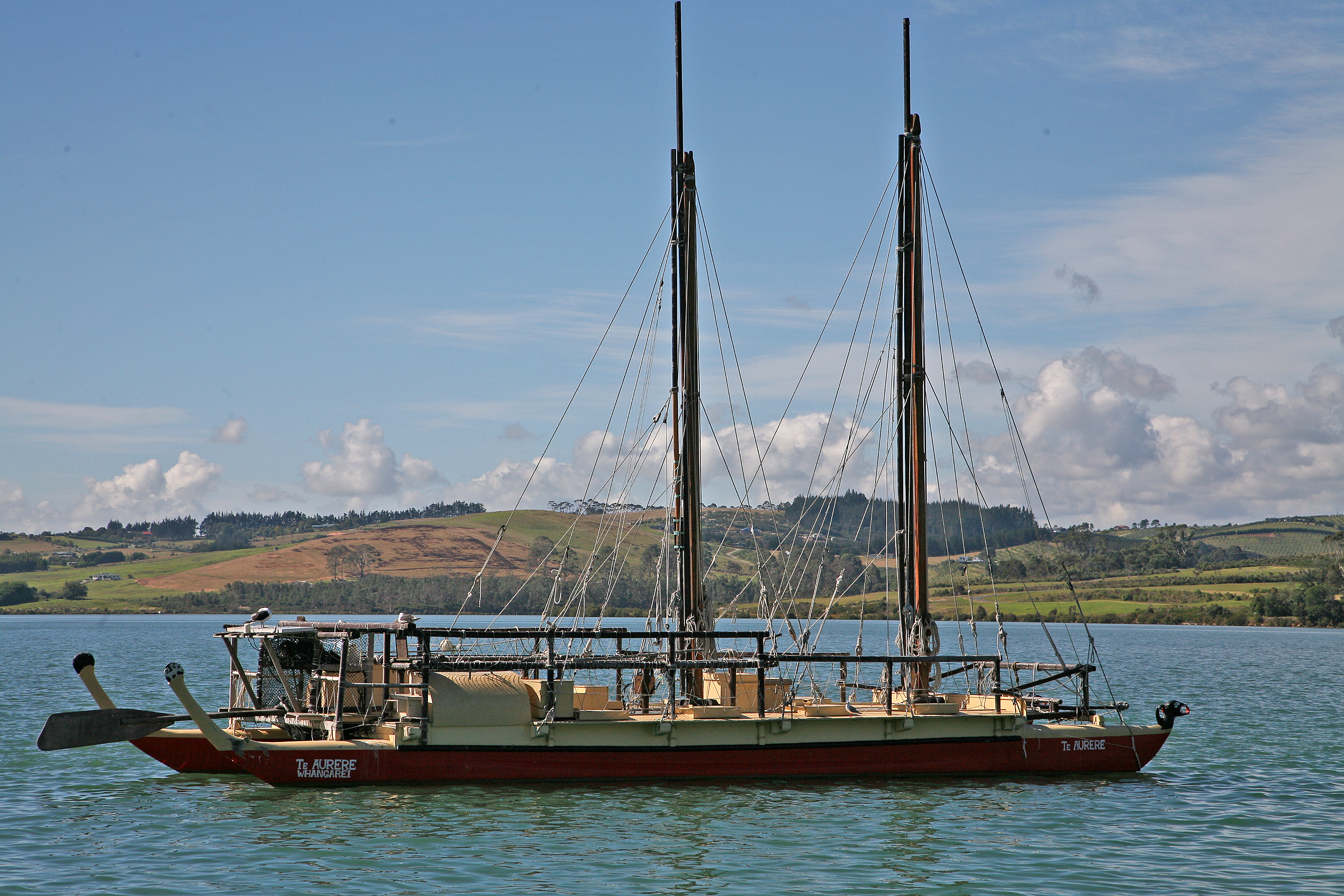
Te Aurere in Mangonui in 2019

Te Aurere, a recreation of the waka used by Polynesians to settle New Zealand, was built and launched at Aurere. The Kupe Waka Centre is a tourist attraction at Aurere which opened in December 2022. It provides education and training for traditional Māori waka construction. The centre is affiliated with the Kaʻiwakīloumoku Cultural Center in Honolulu, Hawaii.

== Demographics ==
Oruru-Parapara covers 103.35 km^{2} (39.90 sq mi) and had an estimated population of 980 as of June 2025, with a population density of 9.5 people per km^{2}.

Historical population
Year	Pop.	±% p.a.
2006	690	—
2013	687	−0.06%
2018	846	+4.25%
2023	954	+2.43%

Oruru-Parapara had a population of 954 in the 2023 New Zealand census, an increase of 108 people (12.8%) since the 2018 census, and an increase of 267 people (38.9%) since the 2013 census. There were 474 males, 477 females and 3 people of other genders in 360 dwellings. 1.9% of people identified as LGBTIQ+. The median age was 47.2 years (compared with 38.1 years nationally). There were 192 people (20.1%) aged under 15 years, 132 (13.8%) aged 15 to 29, 435 (45.6%) aged 30 to 64, and 192 (20.1%) aged 65 or older.

People could identify as more than one ethnicity. The results were 74.2% European (Pākehā); 45.0% Māori; 3.8% Pasifika; 2.2% Asian; 0.3% Middle Eastern, Latin American and African New Zealanders (MELAA); and 3.1% other, which includes people giving their ethnicity as "New Zealander". English was spoken by 98.1%, Māori language by 11.6%, and other languages by 4.7%. No language could be spoken by 1.6% (e.g. too young to talk). New Zealand Sign Language was known by 0.6%. The percentage of people born overseas was 10.1, compared with 28.8% nationally.

Religious affiliations were 32.7% Christian, 0.3% Hindu, 2.2% Māori religious beliefs, 0.6% Buddhist, 0.6% New Age, and 0.9% other religions. People who answered that they had no religion were 51.9%, and 11.3% of people did not answer the census question.

Of those at least 15 years old, 66 (8.7%) people had a bachelor's or higher degree, 426 (55.9%) had a post-high school certificate or diploma, and 246 (32.3%) people exclusively held high school qualifications. The median income was $27,400, compared with $41,500 nationally. 27 people (3.5%) earned over $100,000 compared to 12.1% nationally. The employment status of those at least 15 was that 300 (39.4%) people were employed full-time, 123 (16.1%) were part-time, and 21 (2.8%) were unemployed.

== See also ==
- Oruru River
