= Mahangaatuamatua =

Canoe mentioned in a letter by Uma-kau-oho-mata-kamokamo

Mahanga-atua-matua is a canoe mentioned in a letter by Uma-kau-oho-mata-kamokamo, a Māori chief from the Tauranga district, New Zealand, quoted in White (1887–1891). Claiming that this canoe did not bring any food plants to New Zealand because it was too sacred to carry such items, and was manned by priests and chiefs, Uma-kau-oho-mata-kamokamo said that Mahanga-atua-matua was the first canoe to land in New Zealand, and that he or his people still possessed (the traditions relating to) the priests who built the canoe and the adzes that they used.

== See also ==
- List of Māori waka
