= Mōhakatino River =

Coordinates: 38°44′S 174°37′E

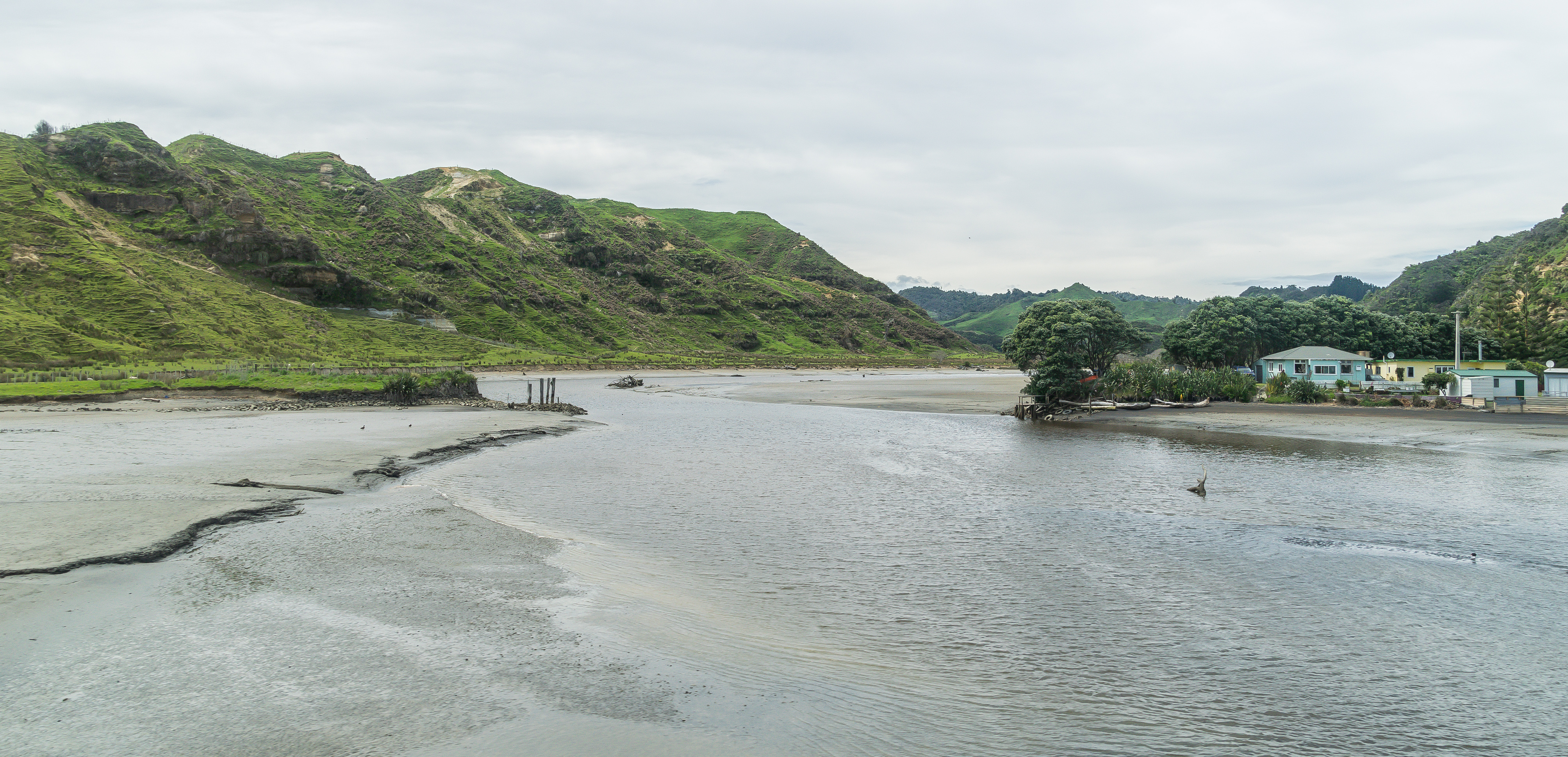

Location
- Country: New Zealand

Physical characteristics
- Mouth
  - location: North Taranaki Bight
- Length: 25 km (16 mi)

The Mōhakatino River is a river in the northern Taranaki region of New Zealand's North Island. It generally flows west from its origins west of Ōhura, roughly paralleling the course of its northerly neighbour, the larger Mokau River. The Mōhakatino reaches the Tasman Sea 3 kilometres (2 mi) south of Mokau.

== See also ==
- List of rivers of New Zealand
