= Oruru River =

Coordinates: 35°01′S 173°28′E

Location
- Country: New Zealand

Physical characteristics
- Mouth
  - location: Taipā River
- Length: 12 km (7.5 mi)

The Oruru River is a river of the Northland Region of New Zealand's North Island. It flows north from its sources south of Mangonui to reach the Taipā River 5 kilometres (3 mi) from Taipā-Mangonui.

The New Zealand Ministry for Culture and Heritage gives a translation of "place of the morepork" for Ōruru.

== See also ==
- List of rivers of New Zealand
