= Āraiteuru =

Canoe (waka) of some of Ngāi Tahu's ancestors in Māori tradition

- Great Māori migration waka
- Landed at: Shag Point
- Iwi: Ngāi Tahu

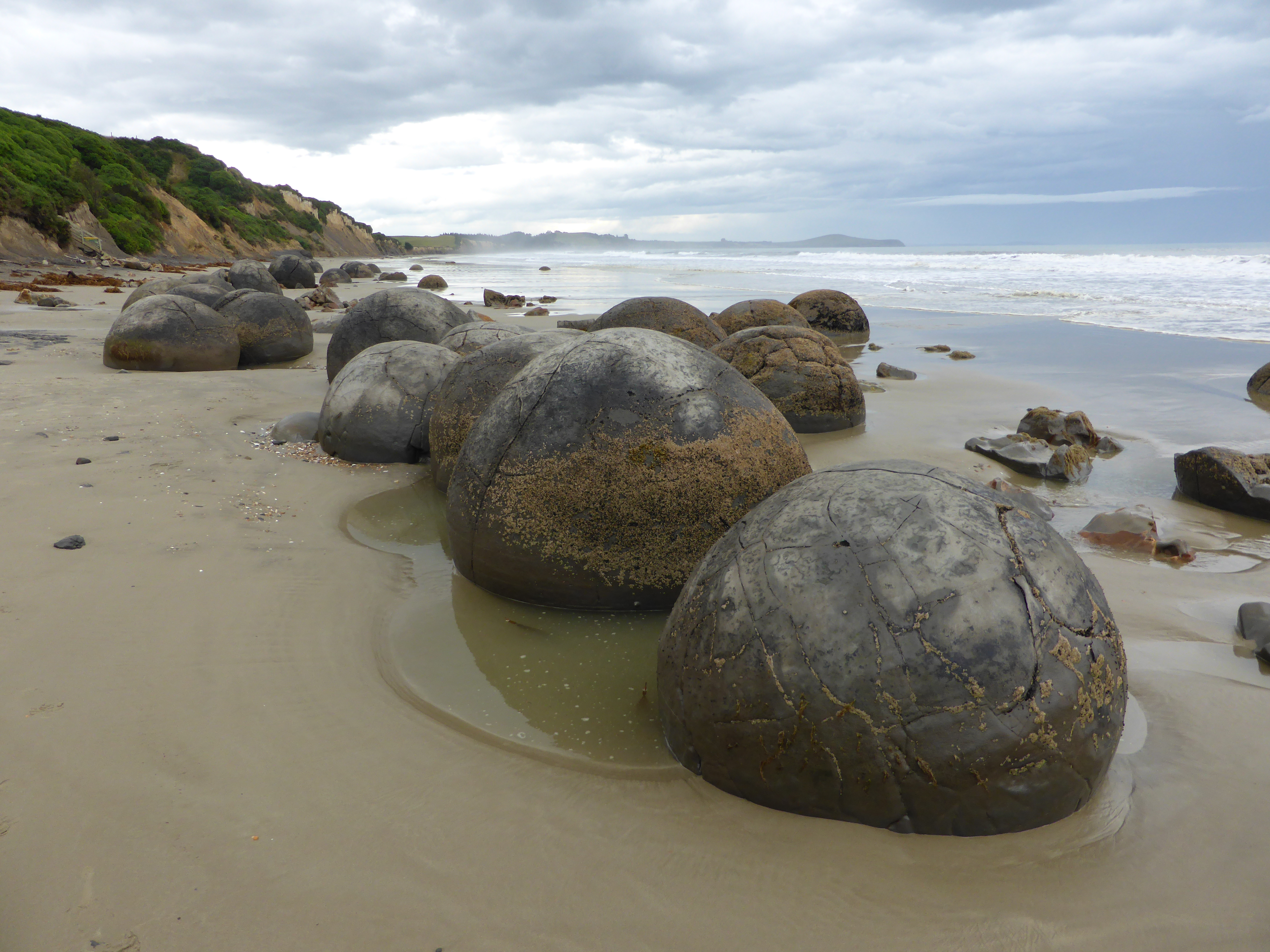
Moeraki Boulders, said to be the water gourd and fishing net of Āraiteuru.

Āraiteuru (also written Ārai-te-uru) was a canoe (waka) of some of Ngāi Tahu's ancestors in Māori tradition.

The name Āraiteuru is "he ingoa tawhito — a name of old" and was the name of a toki carried on another ancestral waka — Takitimu. The name also applies to the sea coast and hinterland of northern Otago and to plantations of kūmara seeded from the waka Āraiteuru.

The canoe was conveyed to New Zealand by the north-east wind, carrying the chiefs Kirikirikatata, Aroarokaehe, Mauka Atua, (Note: In pan-Māori his name is Mangaatua) Aoraki, Kakeroa, Te Horokoatu, Ritua, Ngamautaurua, Pokohiwitahi, Puketapu, Te Maro-tiri-a-te-rehu, Hikuroroa, Pahatea, Te Waioteao, and Hapekituaraki.

The canoe's fishing net and the water gourd (calabash) were turned into stone at Moeraki in the South Island, where they can still be seen in the form of the Moeraki Boulders. The canoe itself remained at Shag Point.

Dunedin's pan-iwi Āraiteuru Marae, located in the suburb of Wakari, is named after the canoe.

== See also ==
- Arahura (canoe)
- Tākitimu
- Uruaokapuarangi
