= Percy Smith (ethnologist) =

New Zealand surveyor and ethnologist

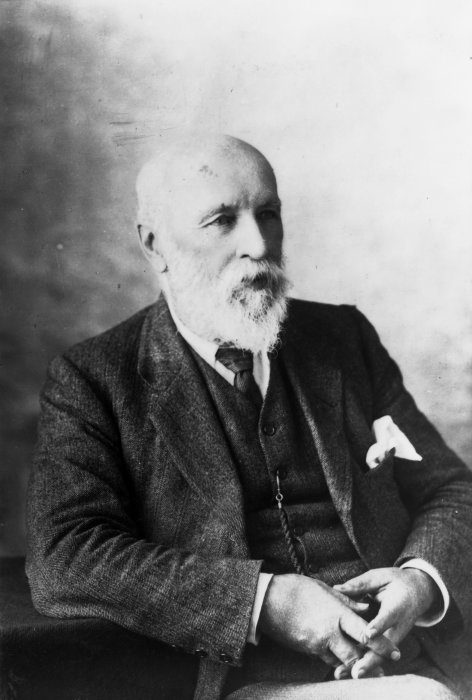
Stephenson Percy Smith, c. 1908 (Note: Photograph by kind permission of the Alexander Turnbull Library, Wellington, New Zealand, Reference number: 1/2-005564-F)

Stephenson Percy Smith (11 June 1840 – 19 April 1922) was a New Zealand ethnologist and surveyor. He researched and wrote about the origins of the Māori people and was one of the founders of the Polynesian Society. While his research has been criticised as flawed, it set a foundation for ethnological study in New Zealand.

== Personal life ==
Stephenson Percy Smith, known as Percy, was born on 11 June 1840 at Beccles, Suffolk, in England. He was the eldest son of Hannah Hursthouse and John Stephenson Smith, who emigrated to New Zealand when he was nine years old. They left London on the New Zealand Company ship Pekin on 9 August 1849, arriving in Wellington on 26 December. John travelled to New Plymouth first, followed by Hannah and the children soon afterwards.

Percy went to school first at New Plymouth and then in Ōmatā, until 1854. Working on the family farm, he developed an interest in the local flora and fauna, and was taught to paint by landscape artist John Gully.

He married Mary Anne Crompton (1842–1911) on 23 April 1863. They had four children.

He died at his home in New Plymouth on 19 April 1922.

== Career ==
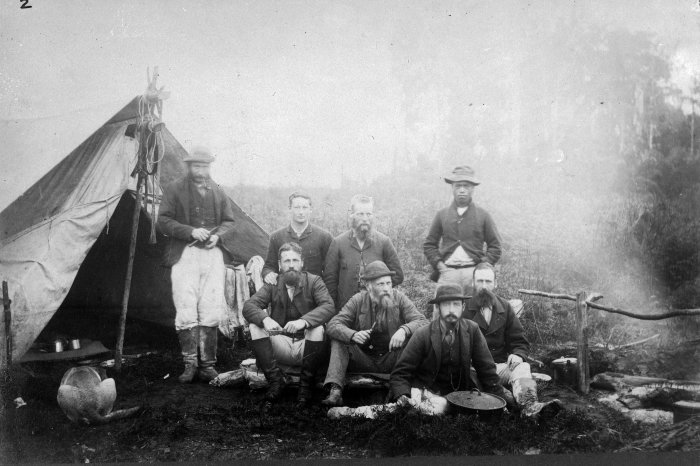
Smith and his survey party at the foot of Mount Tarawera (1886)

=== Surveying ===
Smith joined the survey department of province of Taranaki in February 1855. He subsequently spent months in the bush with other surveyors, which brought him into contact with the indigenous Māori people. Some of this work took place during the Taranaki wars.

In 1862 Smith moved to Auckland, spending three years there before being sent to New Plymouth as district surveyor. His work included surveys of Waiuku, Taranaki, Pitt Island, and the Chatham Islands. Returning to the North Island, with his family based in Auckland from 1871, he oversaw the surveying of Auckland and Hawke's Bay, and laid out plans for Rotorua in 1880.

He rose through the ranks of the civil service:

- 1877: first geodesical surveyor and chief surveyor of the provincial district of Auckland, in the surveyor general's department
- 1881: assistant surveyor general
- 1888: commissioner of Crown lands for the Auckland district
- January 1889: surveyor general and secretary for lands and mines

He retired on 30 October 1900.

=== Ethnology ===
Smith was not formally trained in ethnology, but became familiar with Māori language and culture, partly out of necessity in his work, and also because he was interested in it as a scholar. During his survey expeditions, he collected and recorded information about Māori history and culture, which became the basis for his later career, after his retirement from the civil service, as a Polynesian scholar. His contemporaries recognised his status as a scholar of the language, and he was considered a leading Pākehā authority on the history and culture of the people.

In 1892, he co-founded, with Edward Tregear, the Polynesian Society. He was co-editor of its journal, and a major contributor to it. It was widely believed that the Māori were a dying race, and Smith hoped that his society would help "to interpret and preserve the traditional knowledge of the Māori before this disappeared". During this time Smith also published a large number of articles, books, and pamphlets on the history, mythology, and traditions of Polynesian peoples.

=== Other roles ===
Smith served on several local bodies during his surveying career, including: Public Trust Office board member, Government Life Insurance Department board member, Taranaki Native Reserves board member, Chairman of the Board of Land Purchase Commissioners, Chairman of the Board of Examiners for surveyors, Commissioner under the Urewera District Native Reserves Act 1896.

After retiring from surveying, Smith returned to New Plymouth, but was still called upon to engage in various government business. After the annexation of Niue to New Zealand, he was sent there to help draft a constitution and develop an administrative system. Spending four to five months there, he gathered information which he used to write Niue-fekai (or Savage) Island and its people (1903), and A vocabulary and grammar of the Niue dialect of the Polynesian language (1907, with Edward Tregear).

Smith was a corresponding member of the Royal Anthropological Institute of Great Britain and Ireland, the Società d'anthropologia d'Italia, the Royal Geographical Society, and the Hawaiian Historical Society.

== Recognition and legacy ==
Smith was awarded the Hector Memorial Medal and Prize in 1920, in recognition of his research in Polynesian ethnology.

The assessment of Smith's contribution, unreservedly generous at his death, has changed somewhat in recent decades. The Encyclopaedia of New Zealand (1966) was generally positive, with some qualification. "His careful recording of traditional material, cross checked as far as possible by varying tribal histories, left an invaluable contribution... Although they can now be amplified or corrected on points of detail, the structure is substantially unchanged. In his studies on Māori origins he was more uncritical and framed hypotheses on what now seems slender linguistic and traditional evidence. The nevertheless high standard, for the period, of his own work and its publication provided a touchstone for later amplification which is being revised only today by more developed archaeological and critical techniques".

His entry in the Dictionary of New Zealand Biography (1993) says "In some areas, particularly his account of the origins of the Maori and their arrival in New Zealand, Smith's interpretation has not survived the light cast on it by later historical and archaeological research. Scholars have criticised Smith's use of his source materials and his editing of Maori traditions for publication.... Smith's careers in surveying and ethnology were characterised by hard work and dedication, and he received recognition for both in his lifetime. Although it is now generally accepted that much of his work on the Maori is unreliable, his research nevertheless provided a basis for the development of professional ethnology in New Zealand. As a successful civil servant and respected scholar he was perhaps one of New Zealand's most prolific intellectuals of the late nineteenth century, and was a major contributor to the scientific debate over the origins and nature of the Maori".

Rāwiri Taonui, writing in Te Ara: The Encyclopedia of New Zealand in 2005, accused Smith of false attribution: "The Great Fleet theory was the result of a collaboration between the 19th-century ethnologist S. Percy Smith and the Māori scholar Hoani Te Whatahoro Jury. Smith obtained details about places in Rarotonga and Tahiti during a visit in 1897, while Jury provided information about Māori canoes in New Zealand. Smith then 'cut and pasted' his material, combining several oral traditions into new ones. Their joint work was published in two books, in which Jury and Smith falsely attributed much of their information to two 19th-century tohunga, Moihi Te Mātorohanga and Nēpia Pōhūhū".

Smith's translation of Hoani Te Whatahoro Jury's book, The Lore of the Whare-Wananga, published in 1913, was listed in Books of Mana as one of the 180 most significant works of Māori-authored non-fiction.

=== Percy Smith Medal ===
After the award of the Hector Medal and prize money to Smith in 1920, he retained half of the money, 20 pounds, and sent the rest to Harry Skinner as a gift. Skinner had just been given the position of lecturer in anthropology at the University of Otago in Dunedin, an appointment which signalled the first academic recognition of the discipline in the country. Skinner decided that the money should be used to fund the Percy Smith Medal in honour of his work, in particular the foundation of the Polynesian Society. He gave the money to the university, who doubled it and let it accumulate at compound interest, deciding that it should be awarded every four years, with the recipient receiving half of the accumulated interest. The award was given for a published work in anthropology by a member or former member of staff of either Otago University or Otago Museum.

Skinner recommended that the inaugural award be given to Peter Buck, but the university gave it to Skinner himself. Four years later, it was awarded to Peter Buck. Skinner asked each recipient to forego the cash prize, to increase the capital, until it could pay for medals to be struck. When £120 had accumulated, he asked the Royal Mint in London to create a coin dye bearing an image of Smith. The Mint said it would cost £400, but a deal was accepted a few years later in which the mint struck twelve medals for £200, and one was given to each of the eleven existing award recipients.

The medal is bronze, around 6 cm (2.4 in) in diameter, with a portrait of Smith on the obverse and, on the reverse side, "University of Otago. For research in Anthropology".

Winners of the Percy Smith Medal (to 1978):

- 1925: Harry Skinner
- 1929: Peter Buck (aka Te Rangi Hīroa)
- 1934: D. G. Kennedy
- 1937: David Teviotdale
- 1941: Herries Beattie
- 1948: Roger Duff
- 1950: Catherine Berndt, New Zealand-born Australian anthropologist
- 1956: J.D. Freeman, W.R. Geddes, L.Lockerbie
- 1960: H. B. Hawthorn
- 1965: T.T. Barrow
- 1970: None (Note: "In 1970, the University decided that one medal too many had been awarded and that another should not be awarded until 1974; in that year, however there was no candidate of sufficient merit.")
- 1978: Foss Leach

== Major works ==
Smith's major works include:

- The peopling of the North: notes on the ancient Maori history of the northern peninsula and sketches of the history of the Ngati-Whatua tribe of the Kaipara, New Zealand (1898)
- Hawaiki: the whence of the Māori (1898)
- Wars of the northern against the southern tribes of New Zealand in the nineteenth century (1904)
- History and traditions of the Māoris of the West Coast, North Island of New Zealand prior to 1840 (1910)
- The lore of the whare-wānanga (1913–15)
