= Toi-te-huatahi =

Legendary Māori tupuna (ancestor) of many Māori iwi (tribes)

Toi-te-huatahi, also known as Toi and Toi-kai-rākau, is a legendary Māori tupuna (ancestor) of many Māori iwi (tribes) from the Bay of Plenty area, including Ngāti Awa, Ngāi Te Rangi and Ngāi Tūhoe. The Bay of Plenty's name in te reo Māori, Te Moana-a-Toi, references Toi-te-huatahi.

== Names ==
His name Toi-te-huatahi is a reference to Toi being an only child. Toi-kai-rākau ("Toi the Wood Eater"), was a name given to him by later settlers in the region who introduced agriculture, and is a reference to how Toi would eat the foods of the forest.

== Traditions ==
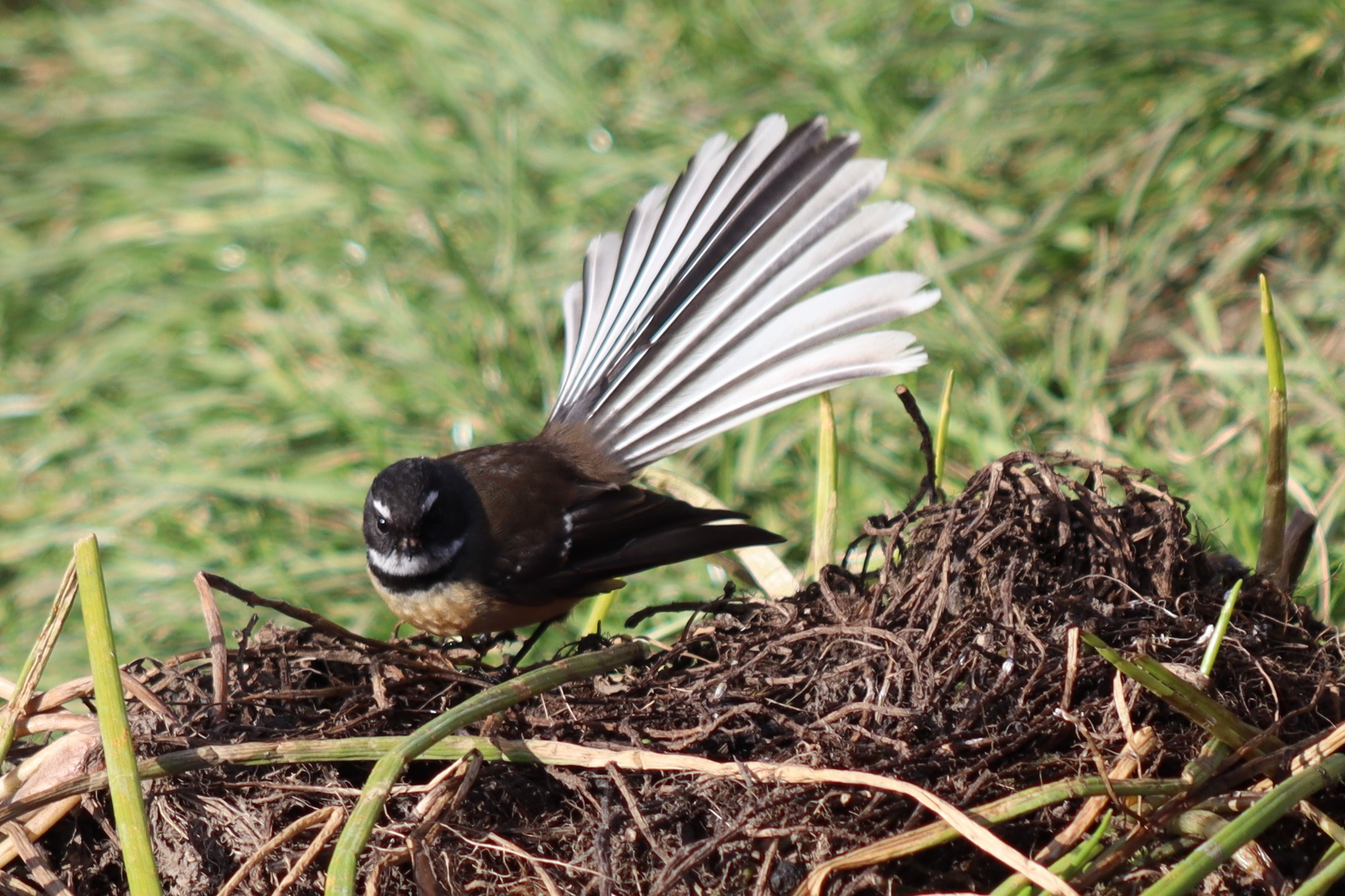
Tīwakawaka (New Zealand fantail).

Toi-te-huatahi's legendary ancestor in Māori mythology was the tīwakawaka (New Zealand fantail). Based on the traditional genealogies of Ngāti Awa, Ngāi Te Rangi and Ngāi Tūhoe, Toi-te-huatahi is estimated to have lived between the 13th and 14th centuries.

According to different traditions, Toi was either born in Hawaiki and came to Aotearoa by a migratory canoe (waka hourua), or was one of the first people to be born in Aotearoa. Toi's people are said to have inhabited the Bay of Plenty region before the arrival of the Arawa, Tainui and Mātaatua migratory waka.

One of the most well-known stories of Toi involves Uenuku. Chief Uenuku of Rangiātea becomes annoyed with a dog and kills it, after which Toi-te-huatahi consumes the dog. The ancestor Tamatekapua and his brother Whakatūria, sons of Houmai, search for the dog, and hear it barking inside Toi's belly. In revenge, they created stilts for Tama (the taller of the brothers) and stole the fruit from Uenuku's poroporo tree. Uenuku declares war, and with his friend Toi he attacks the village of Houmai, but the forces of Uenuku were ultimately defeated.

Ngāti Awa and Ngāi Tūhoe traditions state that Toi lived at a pā named Kaputerangi near modern-day Whakatāne. Many place names around Whakatāne and the Bay of Plenty reference Toi, such as Te Whaiti (Te Whāiti-nui-a-Toi). In Hauraki Māori traditions, Toi lived at Whitianga on the Coromandel Peninsula. The meeting house at Waikirikiri Marae in Ruatoki is named after Toi-kai-rākau. Toi-te-huatahi is said to have visited the Mahurangi Peninsula, and planted a karaka grove at Ōtara, Tāmaki Makaurau.

== Descendants ==
Descentants of Toi are known as Te Tini-o-Toi, while descendants of his grandson Awanuiārangi often refer to themselves as Te Tini-o-Awa. Descendants of Toi were some of the first settlers of Little Barrier Island / Te Hauturu-o-Toi in the Hauraki Gulf. Whātonga, who in some oral histories is described as the captain of the Kurahaupō waka, was the grandson of Toi.
