= Ngahue =

Polynesian Explorer

According to Māori mythology Ngahue (sometimes known as Ngake) was a contemporary of Kupe and one of the first Polynesian explorers to reach New Zealand. He was a native of the Hawaiki and voyaged to New Zealand in “Tāwhirirangi”, his waka (canoe). No time has been fixed for these voyages, but according to legend he discovered pounamu (Greenstone) and Ngahue killed a Moa (large flightless bird - now extinct). Pounamu was sometimes called Te Ika-o-Ngāhue (Ngāhue's fish) and they took several boulders back to Hawaiki.

== Ngai Tahu tradition ==
A Maori legend tells how Ngāhue had a disagreement with his wife, and went forth to seek a new home. The wife, however, caused a green fish named Poutini, a son of the sea god Tangaroa, to pursue her fleeting spouse. Ngahue reached the West Coast of the South Island in line with Aorangi (Mount Cook) with Poutini hot on his tail. Ngahue in his canoe journeyed up the coast, but when off the mouth of the Arahura River, darkness fell. The snow on Mount Tara o Tama mountain at the head of the Arahura River alone furnished brightness. Up the Arahura River sped Ngahue; Poutini followed after, failed to ascend the cascade, was injured, and fell into the deep pool, where the great fish was turned into a greenstone canoe.

— W. A. Taylor, Lore and history of the South Island Maori

== Ngati Kahungunu tradition ==
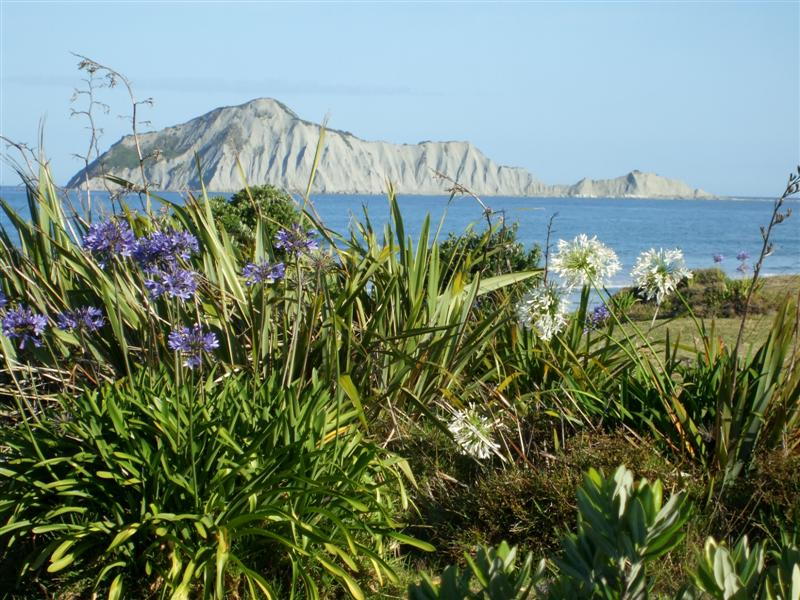
Te Motu-o-Kura

According to a Ngāti Kahungunu tradition, Ngahue was a major chief on Hawaiki at the time when the first Māori travelled to New Zealand. In his old age, he remained in Hawaiki, but his sons and grandsons had gone to the new land. Worried that they might not have enough food, Ngahue ordered a large fish to swim to his children, so that they could eat it. The fish reached the Bay of Plenty, then swam round East Cape to Te Motu-o-Kura. There it was caught by an old tohunga, who had been told that it was coming by the atua (gods). When he hauled the fish to shore he cut it in two, leaving half of it on the beach and taking the other half to his tūāhu altar, where he sacrificed it to the gods, since it was the first fish to be caught that season.

When the tohunga returned to the beach, the half that he had left behind had been transformed into a lump of pounamu, which he named Te Ika a Ngahue ("The fish of Ngahue"). He divided this in two, keeping one half, Te Uira a Karapa ("The gleam of Karapa"), for himself, and giving the other half Te Ramapākura to the people.

Tūnui made Te Uira a Karapa into the threshold of his door and windows, but he subsequently offended the gods and they caused a great earthquake to swallow up the whole house.

Te Ramapākura was itself cut in two. One half of it was declared tapu and only the tohunga and his descendants were allowed to see it. They maintained possession of it for ten generations, but then it was lost. The other half of Te Ramapākura was used to make several famous mere and adzes, including Pahikaure, Kaiarero, Te Rito-o-te-rangi, Te Inumanga-a-wai, and a second Te Ramapākura.

=== The pieces of Te Ramapākura ===
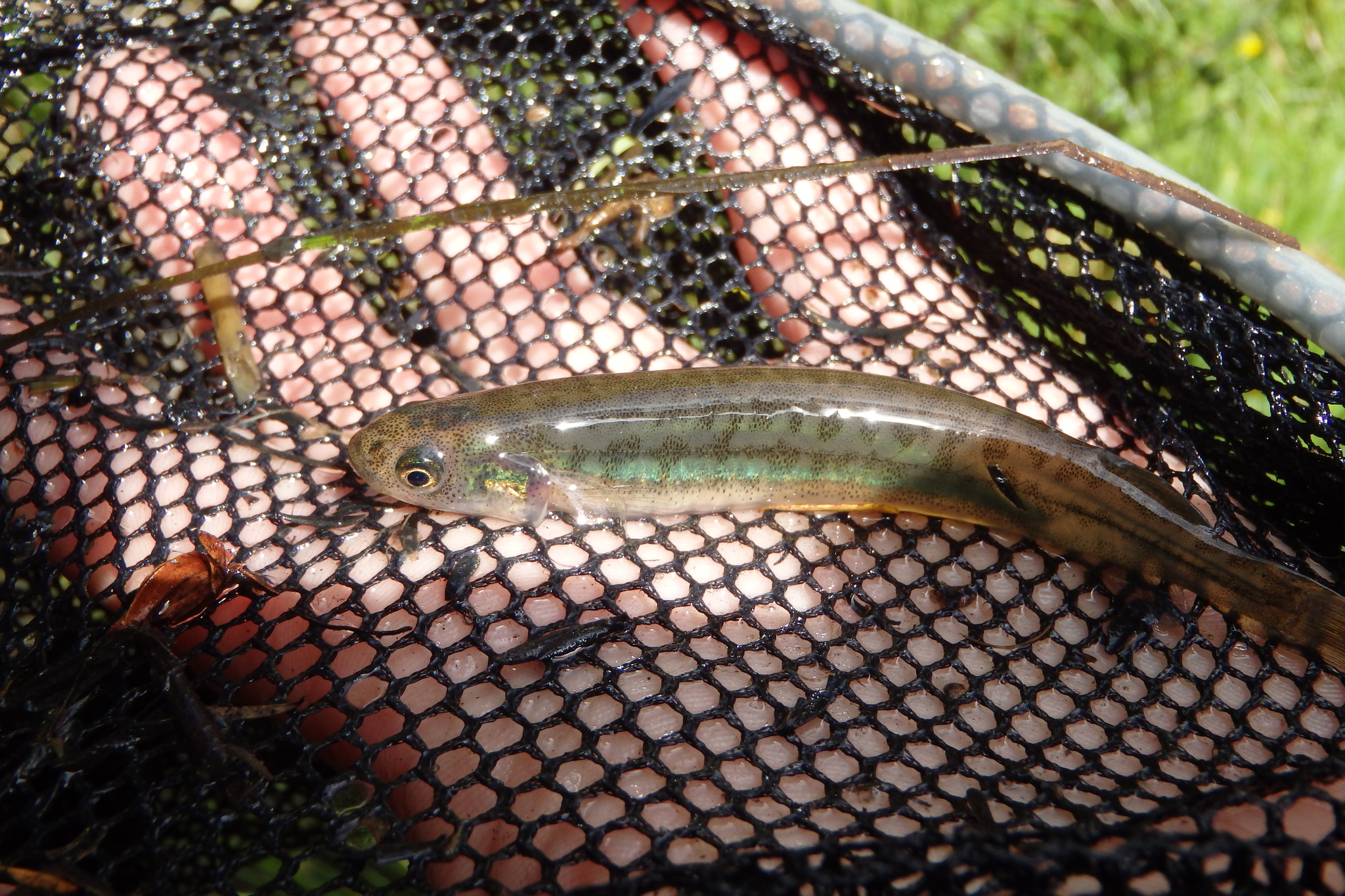
An īnanga fish.

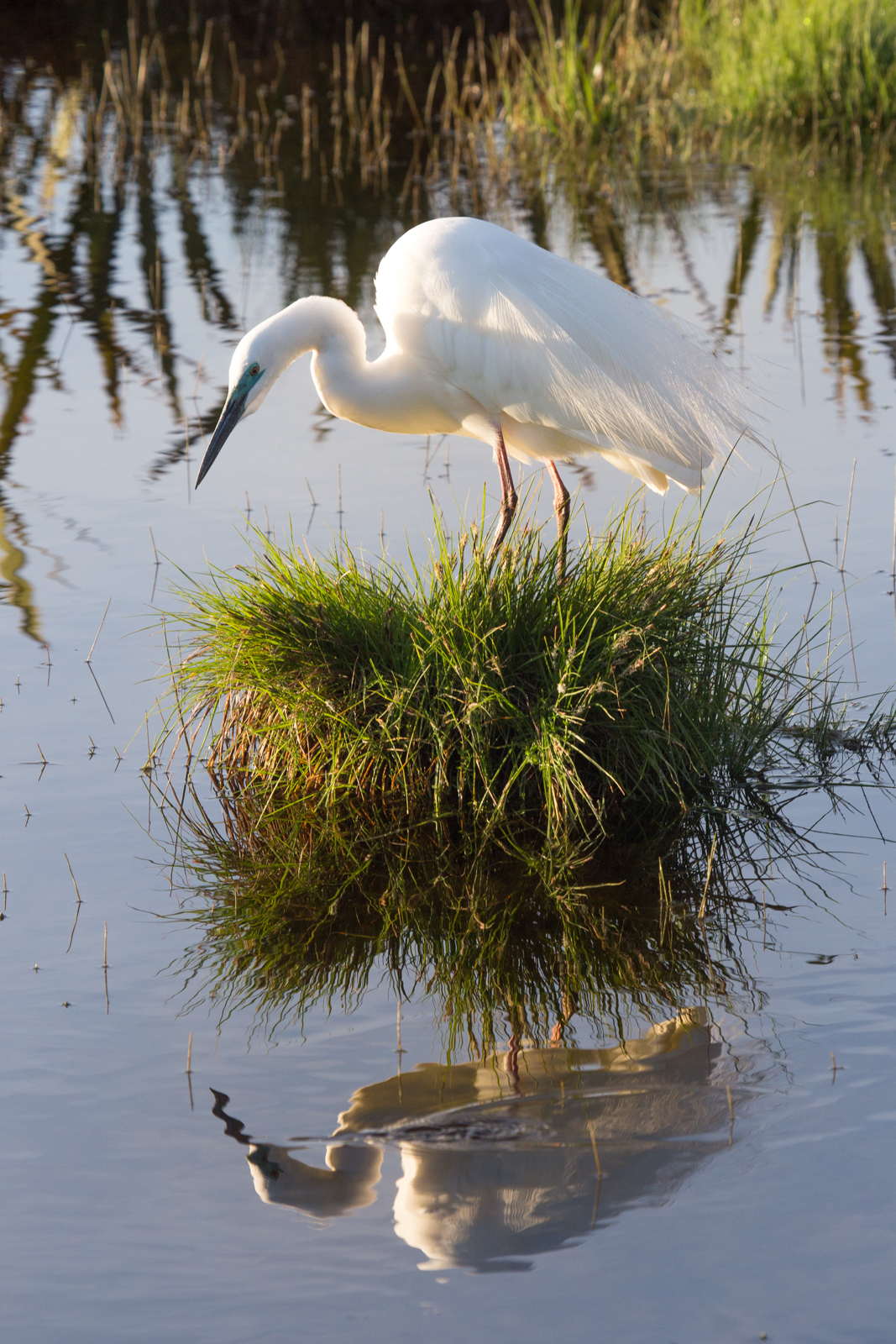
Kōtuku.

The second Te Ramapākura was owned by Te Whareumu of Ngāpuhi in the early nineteenth century and was in the possession of Wiremu Te Paihau of Te Māhia peninsula as of 1959.

Kaiarero and Pahikaure were kept by Ngāti Pāhauwera at Te Aratipi (inland from Te Motu-o-Kura) and were taken from them by Ngāti Tūwharetoa, when they captured Te Aratipi around 1820. The two commanders of the force, Manunui Te Heuheu II and Te Whakarau, each received one of them. The two pieces were made of the īnanga rere type of greenstone, so called because it is silvery like an īnanga fish. Kaiarero was an axe decorated with kōtuku feathers. Pahikaure is a mere, with a shiny silver band of īnanga running through it.

Later in the nineteenth century, Te Whakarau lent Pahikaure to his son-in-law Te Herekiekie, to present as a temporary offering at a funeral for a relative in Ngāti Hinewai. Under the tradition of kōpaki, it was expected that the heirs of deceased would return it to the donors at a subsequent funeral. When Te Papunui (Te Herekiekie's wife and Te Whakarau's daughter) died, Ngāti Hinewai set out with Pahikaure in order to offer it to Te Papunui in turn. However, on the journey, they met Manunui Te Heuheu II and he gave them Kaiarero to offer instead, taking Pahikaure for himself. After the funeral, Te Herekiekie gave Kaiarero to his uncle, Te Kotukuraeroa, who lost it when he was crossing the Manganuioteao River. It was said that Kaiarero had dissolved itself in the water, which was traditionally believed to be a power of īnanga rere, and returned to the ocean from which it had originally come. One of Te Kotukuraeroa's relatives, Pēhi Turoa, gave him one of his mere, Irawaru, which was eventually returned to Te Heuheu as restitution for Kaiarero.

Pahikaure is still held by Ngāti Tūwharetoa and is considered one of the tribe's great treasures. According to tradition, it changes colour, becoming dark and murky whenever a member of the Te Heuheu family is about to die. John Te Herekiekie Grace reports that he saw this happen in May 1929 at the death of Te Kahui Te Heuheu. The chieftainess Te Rerehau Kahotea is depicted holding it in a 1906 painting by Wilhelm Dittmer, called The keeper of Pahikaure which is now in Te Papa Tongarewa.

== Bibliography ==
- Grace, John Te Herekiekie (1970) [1959]. Tuwharetoa: The history of the Maori people of the Taupo District. Auckland [N.Z.]: A.H. & A.W. Reed. ASIN B0007JE64K. ISBN 9780589003739.
