= Moihi Te Mātorohanga =

19th century New Zealand Māori tohunga and historian

Moihi Te Mātorohanga, also known as Moihi (or Mohi) Torohanga, (died c. 1876) was a New Zealand Māori tohunga and historian of the Ngāti Moe subtribe of Ngāti Kahungunu in the Wairarapa. From some time after 1936 he lived at Te Whiti pā, and was regarded as the authority on genealogies (whakapapa) at Te Poho-o-Hinepae, a whare wānanga 'school of learning' near Gladstone. Among those who studied under Te Mātorohanga was Hoani Te Whatahoro Jury, who would transcribe many Ngāti Kahungunu traditions and genealogies.

He was born in Te Ewe-o-Tiina, Wairarapa and, as well as Ngāti Moe, he was related to the tribes: Ngāi Tahu of Wairarapa, Ngāi Tūkoko, Ngāti Kahukura-awhitia and Ngāti Kaumoana.
