= Te Atiawa ki Whakarongotai =

Māori iwi (tribe) in Aotearoa (New Zealand)

- Iwi (tribe) in Māoridom

Te Atiawa ki Whakarongotai is a Māori iwi (tribe) of New Zealand.

== See also ==
- List of Māori iwi
