= Tākitimu =

Polynesian migration canoe

- Great Māori migration waka
- Commander: Tamatea Arikinui, Kahukura, Arutanga, Tangiia
- Iwi: Ngāti Ruapani, Rongowhakaata, Te Aitanga-a-Hauiti, Te Aitanga-a-Māhaki, Ngāti Ranginui, Ngāti Kahungunu, Ngāti Porou, Ngāi Tahu

Tākitimu was a waka (canoe) with connections to the Cook Islands and New Zealand in ancient times. In several Māori traditions, Tākitimu was one of the great voyaging canoes that carried Polynesian migrants from Hawaiki to New Zealand. It was said to have been captained by Tamatea Arikinui.

== Cook Islands Māori traditions ==
The Tākitumu [sic] was an important waka in the Cook Islands with one of the districts on the main island of Rarotonga consequently named after it. Sir Tom Davis, a former prime minister of the Cook Islands, wrote, in the form of a novel, an account of 300 years of voyaging of the Tākitumu by his own forebears as told in their traditions.

== New Zealand Māori traditions ==
The Tākitimu appears in many traditions around New Zealand. Most accounts agree that the Tākitimu was a tapu (sacred) canoe. Many also give the name of the captain as "Tamatea", although in different forms. (He is not to be confused with Tama-te-kapua, who sailed the Arawa to New Zealand.)

=== Traditions of the East Coast ===
==== Te Māhia accounts ====
Accounts from the northern East Coast indicate that the Tākitimu left Hawaiki after two brothers, Ruawharo and Tūpai, took the canoe from their enemies and escaped to New Zealand. The vessel landed on the Māhia Peninsula (Te Māhia) and the crew dispersed: Ruawharo stayed at Te Māhia, a man named Puhiariki went to Muriwhenua in present-day Northland, while others moved to Tauranga.

==== Ngāti Kahungunu accounts ====
A Ngāti Kahungunu account of Tākitimu is given by J. H. Mitchell, according to whom the explorer Hoaki and his brother Taukata had travelled to New Zealand from Hawaiki in the Tutara-kauika, searching for their sister Kanioro, who had been abducted and taken there by Pou-rangahau. They returned in the Te Ara-Tawhao seeking kumara seeds and bearing the news that the islands were sparsely populated. This inspired Tamatea, the Arikinui ("great chieftain"), who led the tribes of Ngāti Hukumoana, Ngāti Hakuturi, and Ngāti Tutakahinahina, which lived in the villages of Whangara, Pakarae, and Rehuroa, to build a canoe and lead a migration to New Zealand.

===== Construction and equipping =====
Tamatea ordered the construction of Tākitimu. It was made by three craftsmen, named Ruawharo, Tupai, and Te Rongo Putahi. The initial work was done on Titirangi hill, the later work at Tamatea's house in Whangara. Four stones, Kohurau, Ka-ra, Anewa, and Pounamu, were used to make five adzes, named Te Awhiorangi, Tewhironui, Rakuraku o Tawhaki, Matangirei, and Hui-te-rangiora. Te Awhiorangi, the most sacred of these adzes, was used by Tamatea to ceremonially cut through the waves, clearing the way for the canoe to travel over the sea. The canoe was first roughly shaped at Titirangi hill and then taken to Tamatea's house at Whangara, where the carving was completed in an extremely sacred enclosure that was off limits to women and commoners. The craftsmen and their tools had to be specially purified in water when their work was over; Mitchell records the karakia sung by the tohunga (high priest) during this work. All the chips and sawdust from the canoe had to be ritually burnt, because they were too sacred to be used for any other purpose.

Tamatea and Ruawharo consecrated Tākitimu by singing a karakia, which Mitchell records, and pouring a calabash of water over the bow. Then four rollers, named Te Tahuri, Mounukuhia, Mouhapainga, and Manutawhiorangi, were used to launch the canoe into Pikopiki-i-whiti lagoon. After this, it was taken in the night to Te-whetu-Matarau and the tohunga Ruawharo cast various protective spells for the boat, one of which Mitchell records. Mitchell forcefully denies stories that Ruawharo alone or with his brother Tupai stole Tākitimu from the tribes of Te Tini-o-Pekerangi, Te Tini-o-Whakarauatupa, Te Tini-o-Makehukuhu, and Te Tini-o-Tutakahinahina.

Takitimu was a large, single-outrigger canoe. It consisted of rauawa (boards attached above the hull), haumi (extensions to the front and back of the boat), taumanu (thwarts), a kāraho or rahoraho (deck), a tauihu (figurehead), rapa (sternpost), whitikotuku (frame for an awning), tira (masts), puhi (plumes of feathers), kārewa (buoys) and hoe (paddles). The canoe had six ceremonial paddles: Rapanga-i-te-atinuku, Rapanga-i-te-ati-rangi, Maninikura, Maniniaro, Tangiwiwini, and Tangi-wawana. There were two bailers: Tipuahoronuku and Tipuahororangi.

At the front of the canoe there was a space for the sacred objects in which the atua (gods) of the people resided. These objects represented Ranginui (the sky) and Papatuanuku (the Earth). The objects also represented a number of spirits that protected Takitimu on its voyage:

- Two tipua Ruamano and Te Araiteuru,
- Four pakake (whales): Hine-korito, Hine-kotea, Hine-makehu, and Hine-huruhuru
- Three taniwha: Te Wehenga kauika, Rua-riki and Maurea
- Tunui-e-te-Ika, Te Po-tuatini, Moko and other spirits.

===== Journey to New Zealand =====
Takitimu was too sacred for cooked food to be allowed onto it, so the crew ate only raw food. Peter Buck says that men, women and children went aboard, but Mitchell says that it was too sacred for commoners, women and children, and that the crew consisted entirely of prestigious men:

- Tamatea Arikinui, the captain of the canoe until it reached Tauranga, who had his seat at the stern and held the ceremonial paddles Rapanga-i-te-atinuku and Rapanga-i-te-ati-rangi.
- Ruawharo, the main tohunga, who had his seat at the bow and held the ceremonial paddles Maninikura and Maniniaro.
- Tupai, brother of Ruawharo, another tohunga, who held the ceremonial paddles Tangiwiwini and Tangi-wawana.
- Tahu Pōkai, ancestor of Ngāi Tahu, the captain of the canoe after it reached Tauranga.
Tākitimu's journey, according to Mitchell
1 Awanui
2 North Cape
3 Te Manga-Tawa, Tauranga
4 Hikurangi
5 Whāngārā
6 Titirangi hill
7 Te Papa, near Oraka on Nukutaurua
8 Waikawa
9 Makeakea
10 Maungaharuru
11 Arahura River

Tākitimu travelled from Hawaiki to Rarotonga in three days. Mitchell follows Percy Smith in making the vessel part of the Great Fleet, but says that because it was a single-rigger canoe, it was faster than the rest of the canoes and left them behind. Tākitimu made the journey from Rarotonga to New Zealand in only eleven days. A shortage of food forced the crew to pray to Tangaroa and Tāne, who provided them with raw fish and birds to eat.

Tākitimu arrived at Awanui on Ninety Mile Beach in Northland. Some members of the crew settled there, but Tamatea and the rest of the crew continued around North Cape, and along the east coast of the North Island to Tauranga. Here Tamatea left Tākitimu, entrusting the command to Tahu, whom he instructed to find a source of pounamu or greenstone (nephrite jade).

As Tākitimu travelled along the east coast, the crew stopped at various locations and gave them names. These included Hikurangi, named after a mountain on Hawaiki, Whāngārā, and the Pakarae River. Titirangi hill in modern Gisborne was named after the hill on which Tākitimu had been built. The tohunga on Tākitimu conducted fire rituals that placed the mauri (life force) of their traditional knowledge in the land at locations which later became the sites of whare wānanga (centres of traditional learning).

When Tākitimu reached Te Papa, near Oraka on Nukutaurua (the Māhia Peninsula), the tohunga Ruawharo left the canoe to settle. At the island of Waikawa at the south end of the Māhia Peninsula, the crew established an important shrine, which was later the site of a whare wānanga called Ngaheru-mai-tawhiti, which Mitchell says became the chief source of mauri for the whole East Coast.

At Wairoa, Tākitimu went up the Wairoa River to Makeakea, now the site of Tākitimu marae. One of the canoe's rollers fell into the river and transformed into a taniwha. Later, part of this roller was recovered and used by a rangatira named Kopu Parapara to build a house at Te Hatepe, which inherited the tapu of Tākitimu. This house was relocated to Waihirere, but it had become derelict by 1898 and was burnt down. In 1926 it was decided to build the Tākitimu marae on this site as a successor to this aspect of the Tākitimu canoe.

As Tākitimu passed the mouth of the Waikari River, the tohunga Tupai saw a mountain inland. He lifted up a pāpāuma (a magical wooden carving representing birds), which transformed into a living bird and flew to the top of the mountain, causing it to make a rumbling sound. The mountain was named Maungaharuru ("rumbling mountain") as a result.

When the canoe reached the Wairarapa region, Tupai left the canoe to settle. Here he established a whare wānanga, where he later educated Rongokako, the son of Tamatea Arikinui.

None of the remaining crew had the power to maintain the special tapu of Tākitimu, so it became a paraheahea (ordinary, non-sacred canoe). Despite this, Tahu Pōkai led Tākitimu onward to the Arahura River on the west coast of the South Island, where he found the source of pounamu, which he had sought. Tākitimu was deposited on a flat ledge in the river, where it turned to stone. Mitchell reports a story that T. W. Ratana attempted to visit the site of the Tākitimu in the early twentieth century, but was thwarted by a supernatural fog.

=== Traditions of the Bay of Plenty ===
The tribes of the Tauranga region refer to the canoe as Takitimu. Some traditions say that the Takitimu was captained by Tamatea, father of Ranginui, the founding ancestor of Ngāti Ranginui. Ngāti Kahungunu recognise this "Tamatea" as the grandson of Tamatea Arikinui, and refer to him as "Tamatea-pokaiwhenua-pokaimoana". However, accounts in Northland and Tauranga do not indicate the existence of more than one "Tamatea" from the Takitimu.

=== Traditions of the South Island ===
South Island traditions indicate that Tamatea explored the western and southern coastlines of the South Island. The Tākitimu is said to have been turned to stone at Murihiku. From there, Tamatea is said to have built another canoe, the Kāraerae, to return to the North Island.

== See also ==
- List of Māori waka

== Bibliography ==
- Black, Te Awanuiārangi (8 February 2005). "Tauranga Moana". Te Ara – the Encyclopedia of New Zealand.
- Craig, R. D. (1989). Dictionary of Polynesian Mythology. New York: Greenwood Press. p. 255.
- Mitchell, J. H. (2014) [First published 1944]. Takitimu: A History of Ngati Kahungunu. Libro International. ISBN 978-1-877514-72-2.
