= Hawaiki =

Folklore of Polynesian island

Hawaiki (also rendered as ʻAvaiki in the Cook Islands, Hawaiki in Māori, Savaiʻi in Samoan, Havaiʻi in Tahitian, Hawaiʻi in Hawaiian) is, in Polynesian folklore, the original home of the Polynesians, before dispersal across Polynesia. It also features as the underworld in many Māori stories.

Anne Salmond states Havaiʻi is the old name for Raiatea, the homeland of the Māori. When British explorer James Cook first sighted New Zealand in 1769, he had on board Tupaia, a Raiatean navigator and priest. Cook's arrival seemed to be a confirmation of a prophecy by Toiroa, a priest from Mahia. At Tolaga Bay, Tupaia conversed with the tohunga associated with the school of learning located there, called Te Rawheoro. The priest asked about the Māori homelands, 'Rangiatea' (Ra'iatea), 'Hawaiki' (Havai'i, the ancient name for Ra'iatea), and 'Tawhiti' (Tahiti).

== Etymology ==
Linguists have reconstructed the term to Proto-Nuclear Polynesian *sawaiki.

The Māori word Hawaiki figures in traditions about the arrival of the Māori in Aotearoa, present day New Zealand. The same concept appears in other Polynesian cultures, the name appearing variously as Havaiki, Havaiʻi, or ʻAvaiki in other Polynesian languages. Hawaiki or the misspelling "Hawaiiki" appear to have become the most common variants used in English. Although the Samoans have preserved no traditions of having originated elsewhere, the name of the largest Samoan island Savaiʻi preserves a cognate with the word Hawaiki, as does the name of the Polynesian islands of Hawaiʻi (the ʻokina denoting a glottal stop that replaces the "k" in some Polynesian languages).

On several island groups, including New Zealand and the Marquesas, the term has been recorded as associated with the mythical underworld and death. William Wyatt Gill wrote at length in the nineteenth century recounting the legends about ʻAvaiki as the underworld or Hades of Mangaia in the Cook Islands. Gill (1876:155) records a proverb: Ua po Avaiki, ua ao nunga nei – 'Tis night now in spirit-land, for 'tis light in this upper world." Tregear (1891:392) also records the term Avaiki as meaning "underworld" at Mangaia, probably sourced from Gill. The proposed origin of Hawaiki being both the ancestral homeland and the underworld is that both are the dwelling places of ancestors and the spirits.

Other possible cognates of the word Hawaiki include saualiʻi ("spirits" in Samoan) and houʻeiki ("chiefs" in Tongan). This has led some scholars to hypothesize that the word Hawaiki, and, by extension, Savaiʻi and Hawaiʻi, may not, in fact, have originally referred to a geographical place, but rather to chiefly ancestors and the chief-based social structure that pre-colonial Polynesia typically exhibited.

On Easter Island, the name of the home country in oral tradition appears as Hiva. According to Thor Heyerdahl, Hiva was said to lie east of the island. Sebastian Englert records:

He-kî Hau Maka: "He kaiga iroto i te raá, iruga! Ka-oho korua, ka-û'i i te kaiga mo noho o te Ariki O'Hotu Matu'a!
Translation: "The island towards the sun, above! Go, see the island where King Hotu Matuʻa will go and live!"

Englert puts forward the claim that Hiva lies to the West of the island. The name Hiva is found in the Marquesas Islands, in the names of several islands: Nuku Hiva, Hiva Oa and Fatu Hiva (although in Fatu Hiva the hiva element may be a different word, ʻiva). It is also notable that in the Hawaiian Islands, the ancestral homeland is called Kahiki, a cognate of Tahiti, where at least part of the Hawaiian population came from.

== Legends ==
According to various oral traditions, the Polynesians migrated from Hawaiki to the islands of the Pacific Ocean in open canoes, little different from the traditional craft found in Polynesia today. The Māori people of New Zealand trace their ancestry to groups of people who reportedly travelled from Hawaiki in about 40 named waka (compare the discredited Great Fleet theory of the Polynesian settlement of New Zealand).

Polynesian oral traditions say that the spirits of Polynesian people return to Hawaiki after death. In the New Zealand context, such return-journeys take place via Spirits Bay, Cape Reinga and the Three Kings Islands at the extreme north of the North Island of New Zealand. This may indicate the direction in which Hawaiki may lie.

== Modern science and practical testing of theories ==
Migration routes of the Polynesians

Until the early 21st century, many anthropologists had doubts that the canoe-legends described a deliberate migration. They tended to believe that the migration occurred accidentally when seafarers became lost and drifted to uninhabited shores.

In 1947 Thor Heyerdahl sailed the Kon-Tiki, a balsa-wood raft, from South America into the Pacific in an attempt to show that humans could have settled Polynesia from the eastern shores of the Pacific Ocean, with sailors using the prevailing winds and simple construction techniques.

However, DNA, linguistic, botanical, and archaeological evidence all indicate that the Austronesian-speaking peoples (including the Polynesians) probably originated from islands in eastern Asia, possibly from present-day Taiwan. From there they gradually migrated southwards and eastwards through the South Pacific Ocean.

The sweet potato, which is of South American origin, is widely cultivated in Polynesia. This suggests that some interaction between the Polynesians and the indigenous peoples of South America may have taken place. No Polynesian crops were introduced into the Americas, and there is possible evidence of Polynesian contact only in Chile. Austronesian and Polynesian navigators may have deduced the existence of uninhabited islands by observing migratory patterns of birds.

In recent decades, boatbuilders (see Polynesian Voyaging Society) have constructed ocean-going craft using traditional materials and techniques. They have sailed them over presumed traditional routes using ancient navigation methods, showing the feasibility of such deliberate migration that make use of prevailing winds.

== See also ==
- Hawaiʻiloa
- Hōkūleʻa
- Kupe
- Percy Smith
- Urheimat
- Polynesian navigation
