= Māori migration canoes =

Aspect of Māori oral history involving migration on legendary canoes

Māori oral histories recount how their ancestors sailed from their homeland to New Zealand in ocean-going canoes (waka). Some of these traditions name a homeland called Hawaiki. The canoes were probably twin-hulled canoes (waka hourua) or large outrigger canoes.

== Traditions ==
Possible migration routes of the Polynesians (based on radiocarbon dating genetics scholarship of the 2010s; see file details for citations)

Among the legends is the story of Kupe, who had eloped with Kūrāmarotini, the wife of Hoturapa, the owner of the great canoe Matahourua, whom Kupe had murdered. To escape punishment for the murder, Kupe and Kura fled in Matahourua and discovered a land he called Aotearoa ('land of the long-white-cloud'). He explored its coast and killed the sea monster Te Wheke-a-Muturangi, finally returning home to spread the news of his newly discovered land. (Note: According to K.R. Howe, "Kupe was not a well-known figure in tradition" and his position as the discoverer of New Zealand is "a fabrication".)

Other stories from various Māori tribes report migrations to escape famine, over-population, and warfare. These were made in legendary canoes, the best known of which are Aotea, Te Arawa, Kurahaupō, Mātaatua, Tainui, Tākitimu, and Tokomaru. Various traditions name numerous other canoes. Some, including the Āraiteuru, are well known; others including the Kirauta and the sacred Arahura and Mahangaatuamatua are little known.

== "Great fleet" hypothesis ==
Percy Smith believed that the Polynesian traditions may have been flawed in detail, but they preserved the threads of truth that could be recovered using a method already well established for Hawaiian traditions by Abraham Fornander (An Account of the Polynesian Race, 1878–1885). The method involved seeking out common elements of tradition from different sources and aligning these to genealogies to give a timeframe for the events. Fornander, Smith and others used the method to reconstruct the migrations of the Polynesians and traced them back to a supposed ancient homeland in India.

Smith used the Fornander method and combined disparate traditions from various parts of New Zealand and other parts of Polynesia to derive the "Great Fleet" hypothesis. Through an examination of the genealogies of various tribes, he came up with a set of precise dates for the Great Fleet and the explorers that he and others posited as having paved the way for the fleet.

Smith's account went as follows. In 750 CE the Polynesian explorer Kupe discovered an uninhabited New Zealand. Then in 1000–1100 CE, the Polynesian explorers Toi and Whātonga visited New Zealand, and found it inhabited by a primitive, nomadic people known as the Moriori. Finally, in 1350 CE a 'great fleet' of seven canoes – Aotea, Kurahaupō, Mataatua, Tainui, Tokomaru, Te Arawa and Tākitimu – all departed from the Tahitian region at the same time, bringing the people now known as Māori to New Zealand. These were advanced, warlike, agricultural tribes who destroyed the Moriori.

— Kerry Howe, Te Ara – the Encyclopedia of New Zealand

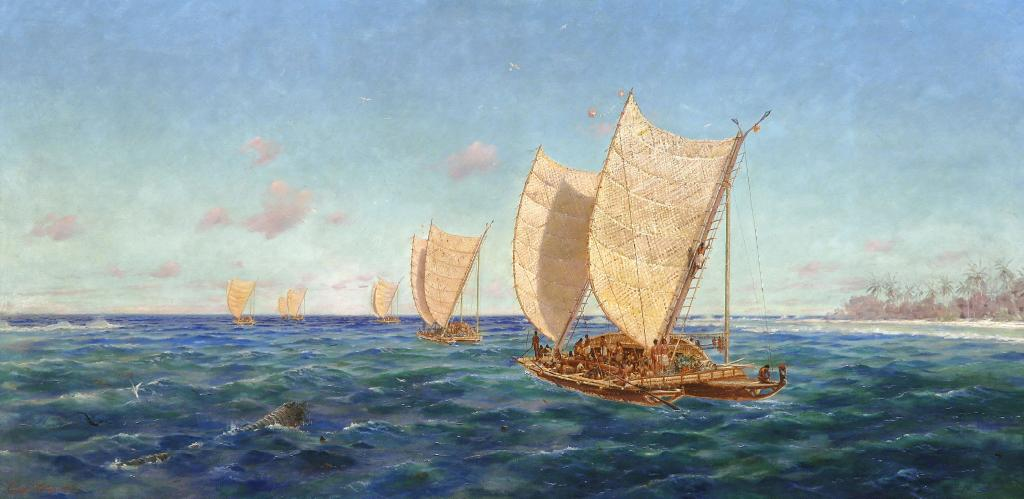
Departure of the Six Canoes from Raratonga for New Zealand, AD1350, a 1906 painting by Kennett Watkins depicting the imagined Great Fleet leaving Rarotonga in 1350

The Great Fleet scenario won general acceptance, its adherents including the respected Māori ethnologist Te Rangi Hīroa (Sir Peter Buck), and it was taught in New Zealand schools. However, it was effectively demolished during the 1960s by the ethnologist David Simmons, who showed that it derived from an incomplete and indiscriminate study of Māori traditions as recorded in the 19th century. (Note: Howe puts it more strongly by stating that Smith's great fleet was "a fabrication" and that Simmons "demonstrated that Smith manipulated tradition and other evidence to produce the story he wanted".) Simmons also suggests that some of these "migrations" may actually have been journeys within New Zealand. It is now understood too that the Moriori are an isolated offshoot of Māori who settled the Chatham Islands around 1500 CE, not a pre-Māori ethnic group of New Zealand.

The historian Rawiri Taonui accuses Smith of falsification: "The Great Fleet theory was the result of a collaboration between the 19th-century ethnologist S. Percy Smith and the Māori scholar Hoani Te Whatahoro Jury. Smith obtained details about places in Rarotonga and Tahiti during a visit in 1897, while Jury provided information about Māori canoes in New Zealand. Smith then 'cut and pasted' his material, combining several oral traditions into new ones. Their joint work was published in two books, in which Jury and Smith falsely attributed much of their information to two 19th-century tohunga, Moihi Te Mātorohanga and Nēpia Pōhūhū".

== See also ==
- List of Māori waka
- Anaweka waka
- Chatham Island waka
- Polynesian navigation
- Whakapapa

== Bibliography ==
- R. D. Craig, Dictionary of Polynesian Mythology (Greenwood Press: New York) 1989, 24–26.
- A. Fornander, An Account of the Polynesian Race 3 volumes. (London: Kegan Paul), 1878–1885.
- T. R. Hiroa (Sir Peter Buck), The Coming of the Maori. Second edition. First Published 1949. Wellington: Whitcombe and Tombs) 1974.
- K. R. Howe, 'Ideas about Māori origins', Te Ara – the Encyclopedia of New Zealand, updated 3-Apr-2006.
- G. Irwin, The Prehistoric Exploration and Colonisation of the Pacific. (Cambridge University Press: Cambridge) 1992.
- D. R. Simmons, The Great New Zealand Myth: A Study of the Discovery and Origin Traditions of the Maori (Reed: Wellington) 1976.
- S. P. Smith, History and Traditions of the Maoris of the West Coast North Island of New Zealand Prior to 1840 (New Plymouth: Polynesian Society) 1910.
- Taonui, Rāwiri (8 February 2005). "Canoe traditions". Te Ara – the Encyclopedia of New Zealand.
- R. Walter, R. Moeka'a, History and Traditions of Rarotonga by Te Ariki Tara 'Are, (Auckland: The Polynesian Society) 2000, viii.
