= List of Māori deities =

This is a list of Māori deities, known in Māori as atua.

Note: there are two Mythologies relating Tangaroa, Papatuanuku and Ranginui (Raki)

== Major departmental deities ==
- Haumiatiketike, the god of uncultivated food, particularly bracken fern.
- Papatūānuku, the primordial earth mother.
- Ranginui, the primordial sky father.
- Rongomātāne, the god of cultivated foods, particularly sweet potato / Kūmara.
- Tānemahuta, the god of forests and birds.
- Tangaroa, the god of the ocean and the creatures within. (Original Father in the Main Mythology)
- Tāwhirimātea, the god of storms and violent weather.
- Tūmatauenga, the god of war, hunting, cooking, fishing, and food cultivation.
- Whiro, the lord of darkness and embodiment of all evil and death.
- Aituā, the god of death, unhappiness, and misfortune.
- Ao, a personification of light.
- Auahitūroa, the personification of comets, and the origin of fire.
- Haere, several personifications of the rainbow.
- Ikatere, a fish god and father of all sea creatures.
- Io Matua Kore, the supreme being; personification of light and the world of the living and the forest.
- Kahukura, a war god who appears as the upper bow of a double rainbow.
- Kiwa, one of several divine guardians of the ocean.
- Makeatutara, the father of Māui and guardian of the underworld.
- Maru, the god of freshwater, southern god of war.
- Mataaho, a god of earthquakes and volcanoes from the Tāmaki Makaurau Region (Auckland).
- Māui, a demigod, culture hero, and trickster.
- Motoro
- Ngahue or Kahue, the god or discoverer of pounamu, the taniwha Poutini is his guardian.
- Pūhaorangi, a celestial being who descended from the heavens to sleep with the beautiful maiden Te Kuraimonoa.
- Punga or Hairi, the ancestor of sharks, lizards, rays, and all deformed, ugly things.
- Rehua, the star god with the power of healing.
- Rongomai, the name of a number of separate beings.
- Rongo, the god of crops and peace
- Rūaumoko, the god of volcanoes, earthquakes, and seasons.
- Tamanuiterā, the personification of the sun.
- Tane-rore, the personification of shimmering air.
- Tāwhaki, a semi-supernatural being associated with thunder and lightning.
- Te Uira, the personification of lightning.
- Tiki, the first human, but sometimes a child of Rangi and Papa, and creator of the first human.
- Tinirau, a guardian of fish.
- Tūtewehiwehi, the father of all reptiles.
- Uenuku, a god of the rainbow, associated with war. Also a deified ancestor.
- Urutengangana, the god of the light.

== Female atua ==
- Ārohirohi, the goddess of mirages and shimmering heat.
- Hinauri, sister, or uncommonly, wife of Māui, associated with the moon.
- Hinekapea, the goddess of loyalty.
- Hinehōaka, the goddess of sandstone, the taniwha Whatipū is her guardian.
- Hinenuitepō, the goddess of night and death, and ruler of the underworld.
- Hine-kau-ataata
- Hinepūkohurangi, the goddess of the mist
- Hineteiwaiwa, the goddess of childbirth, te whare pora and the arts
- Hinemoana, the goddess of the ocean
- Ikaroa, the long fish that gave birth to all the stars in the Milky Way.
- Kohara
- Kui, the chthonic demigod.
- Mahuika, the goddess of fire.
- Mārikoriko
- Moekahu, a lesser known goddess (or god) of Tūhoe whose form was of a dog (kurī), and a sibling of Haere.
- Rohe, the goddess of the spirit world.
- Tangotango, a celestial woman who fell in love with the great hero Tāwhaki and came to earth to become his wife.
- Tūāwhiorangi, the wife of Kahukura who manifests as the lower bow during a double rainbow.
- Whaitiri, the personification of thunder.

== See also ==
- Family tree of the Māori gods
