= Family tree of the Māori gods =

This is an example of a family tree of the Māori gods showing the most important gods in Māori mythology.

This family tree gives just an example - there are remarkable regional variations.

Māori Goddesses are displayed in italics

The primordial gods were Ranginui and Papatūānuku, Heaven and Earth.

Ranginui; Sky father	Papatūānuku; Earth mother
Tūmatauenga; God of war, hunting, fishing and agriculture	Tāwhirimātea; God of the Weather, and storms	Hine-ahu-one; First woman	Tāne-mahuta; God of forests and birds	Tangaroa; God of the sea	Rongo-mā-tāne; God of peace, and of cultivated plants	Haumia-tiketike; God of wild food plants	Urutengangana; God of the light	Ruaumoko; God of Earthquakes, Volcanoes and Seasons
Hine Tiitama; Later, Hine-nui-te-pō, Goddess of death	Hine-te-Iwaiwa	Punga; Ancestor of all strange creatures	Taro; Colocasia esculenia	Aka-pohue	Aka-Tawhiwhi	Kaitangata; Husband of Whaitiri
Tangaroa-a-kiukiu	Tangaroa-a-roto	Rona	Ikatere; Ancestor of fish	Tū-te-wehiwehi; Ancestor of reptiles
Hine Raumati; Personification of Summer	Hine Takurua; Personification of Winter	Māui; Demigod
Tane Rore; Inventor of Kapa haka	Tama-nui-te-rā; Personification of the Sun

Te Anu-matao was the wife of Tangaroa.

Hine-titamauri was the wife of Punga.

Hine-te-Iwaiwa married Tangaroa and had Tangaroa-a-kiukiu, Tangaroa-a-roto, and Rona. Tangaroa-a-roto and Rona married Te Marama the moon. Hinetakurua married Tama-nui-te-ra, the Sun.

Uru-Te-ngangana is believed to be the father of all light, and his children are stars, sun and moon.

The father and mother of creation/all gods are personifications of the stages of creation; Te Kore, Te Po, etc

== See also ==
- Māori mythology
- List of Māori deities
