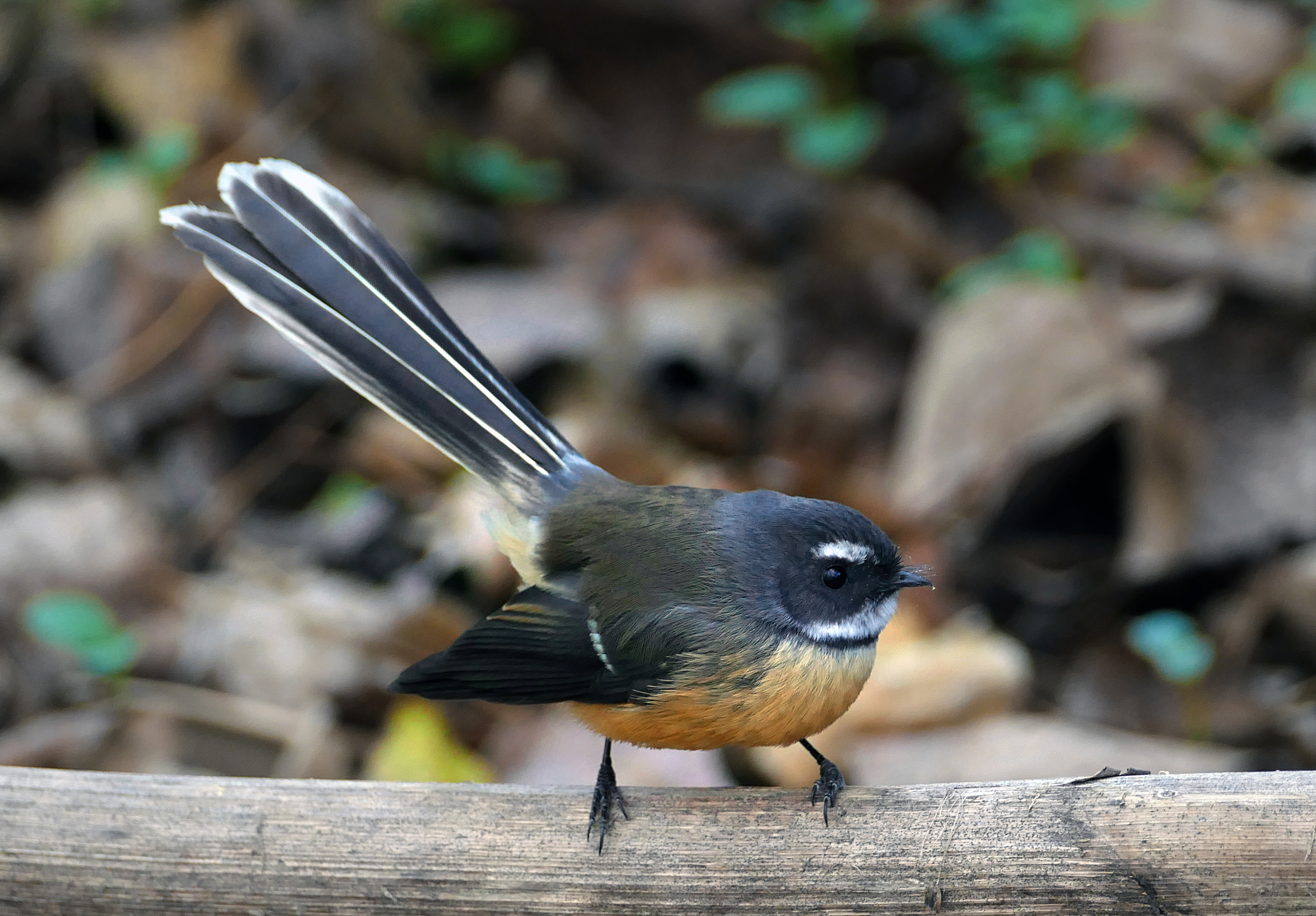
- New Zealand fantail

Conservation status
- Least Concern (IUCN 3.1)

Scientific classification
- Kingdom: Animalia
- Phylum: Chordata
- Class: Aves
- Order: Passeriformes
- Family: Rhipiduridae
- Genus: Rhipidura
- Species: R. fuliginosa

Binomial name
- Rhipidura fuliginosa (Sparrman, 1787)

= New Zealand fantail =

Species of bird

The New Zealand fantail (Rhipidura fuliginosa) is a small insectivorous bird, the only species of fantail in New Zealand. It has four subspecies: R. f. fuliginosa in the South Island, R. f. placabilis in the North Island, R. f. penita in the Chatham Islands, and the now-extinct R. f. cervina formerly on Lord Howe Island. It is also known by its Māori names, pīwakawaka, tīwakawaka or piwaiwaka, and the Chatham Island subspecies by the Moriori name tchitake; the common pied morph is also known as pied fantail (not to be confused with the Malaysian or Philippine pied fantails), and the uncommon dark morph is also known as black fantail (not to be confused with the black fantail of New Guinea). The species has been considered by many to be conspecific (the same) as the grey fantail (Rhipidura albiscapa) of Australia and New Caledonia; however, due to significant differences in its calls, many authorities now treat it as a separate species.

== Taxonomy ==
The New Zealand fantail was formally described and illustrated in 1787 by the Swedish naturalist Anders Sparrman. He placed it with the flycatchers in the genus Muscicapa and coined the binomial name Muscicapa fuliginosa. The specific epithet is from Late Latin fuliginosus meaning "sooty". The New Zealand fantail is now one of 51 fantails placed in the genus Rhipidura that was introduced in 1827 by the naturalists Nicholas Vigors and Thomas Horsfield. The New Zealand fantail has sometimes been treated as conspecific with the grey fantail (Rhipidura albiscapa) (Gould, 1840) from Australia, the Solomon Islands and New Caledonia.

Four subspecies are recognised:

- R. f. fuliginosa Sparrman, 1787 – South and Stewart Islands (New Zealand)
- R. f. placabilis Bangs, 1921 – North Island (New Zealand)
- R. f. penita Bangs, 1911 – Chatham Islands (east of South Island, New Zealand)
- † R. f. cervina Ramsay, EP, 1879 – Lord Howe Island (east of Australia) (extinct)

== Description ==
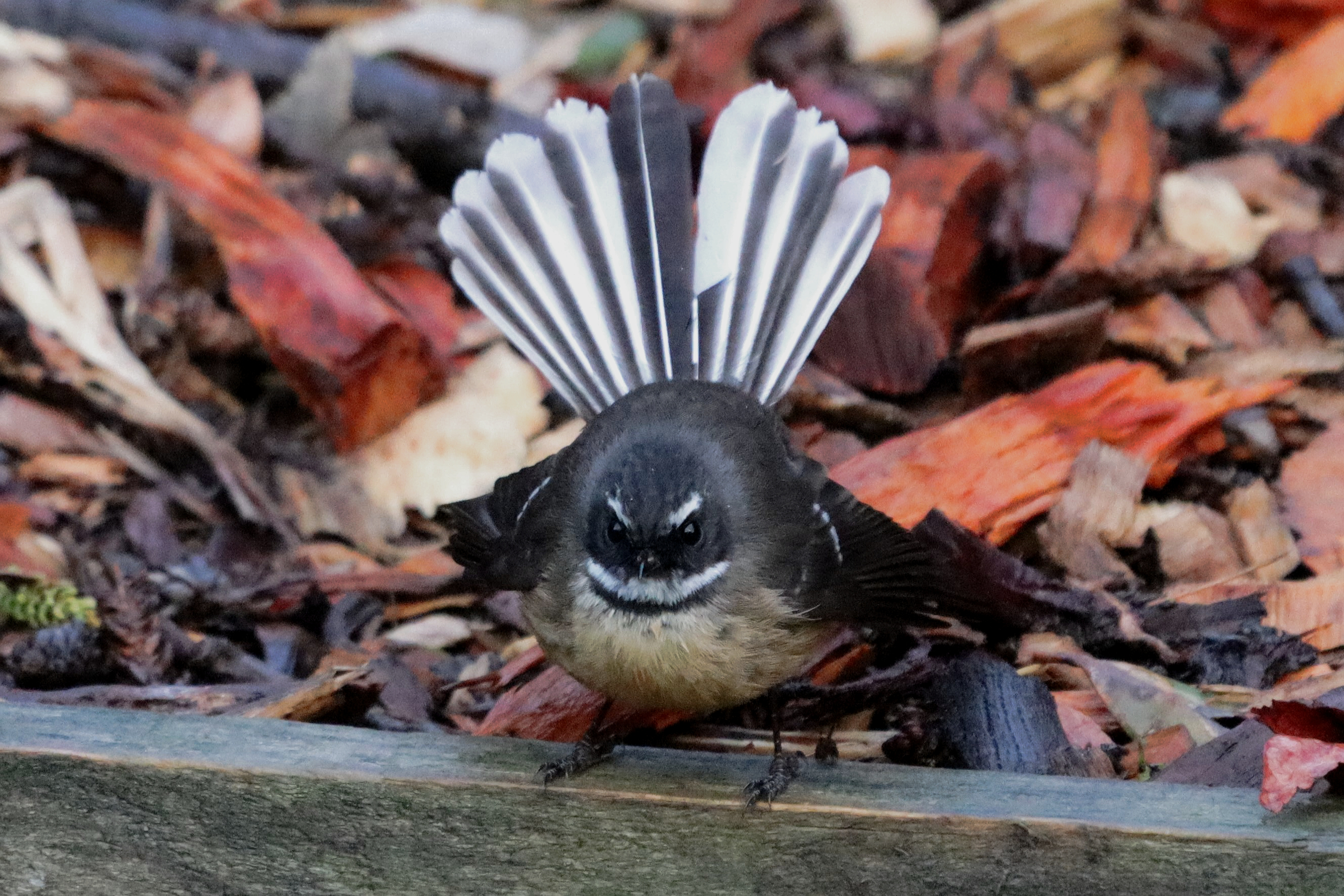
Bird with tail fanned out showing how it got its name

This fantail is mid to dark grey or grey-brown above, yellowish/orange below, with a dark band across the chest below a white throat, white markings over the eye, and (depending on the race) either white-edged or entirely white outer tail feathers. It grows to 16 cm (6.3 in) in length, of which half is the tail, which, as the name implies, is often displayed fanned out. This reveals that the outer tail feathers are light and the centre ones are dark. Some subspecies are found in a darker plumage, notably the "black fantail" morph seen in 4% of South Island birds and less than 1% of North Island birds (it is completely absent from the Chatham Islands). The black morph lacks the white areas and so is dark all over apart from a white spot behind the eye. Fantails are also famous worldwide for their fan-shaped tail.

Juveniles are similar to the adults but have a browner body and indistinct body markings.

A rare completely white fantail was captured on camera in 2017 in Northland, experts thinks it's not albino, but leucism.

== Behaviour ==
During waking hours the bird is almost never still. It flits from perch to perch, sometimes on the ground but mostly on the twigs of a tree or any other convenient object, looking out for flying insects. The birds are not shy, and will often flit within a few metres of people, especially in forested areas and suburban gardens. In doing so, it is able to catch any small flying insects that may have been disturbed by human activities such as walking or digging. Under cold temperatures a flock of fantails will huddle to stay warm. Due to the constant movement of fantails, people who fidget a lot are sometimes called a fantail's tail.

The bird's call is an almost metallic cheek, either as a single sound or (more often) repeated as a chattering.

=== Breeding ===
Adult male territorial song of the South Island fantail

The New Zealand fantail is a seasonal breeder, nesting from August to March in the North Island, September to January in the South Island and October to January on the Chatham Islands. They usually raise two or more broods per season. The birds form compact, cup-shaped nests, usually in the forks of trees, made from moss, bark and fibre, and often completed with spider's web. Both sexes build the nest. The clutch size is usually three to four cream eggs which are spotted grey and brown. The incubation period is around two weeks, and incubation and feeding duties are shared by both adults. Nest building and incubation of the second brood may occur while the fledged young of the first brood are still being fed. Young males may begin breeding two months after fledging. The nests of the New Zealand fantail are occasionally parasitised by the two species of cuckoo in New Zealand.

Approximately 45% of 81 nesting attempts that were monitored in urban Wellington successfully fledged chicks: one in four nests being abandoned or deserted and just over one in four suffering predation. Nests built on thin branches were more likely to escape predation from ship rats than those built on thick branches.

== In mythology ==
In Māori mythology, the pīwakawaka is a messenger, bringing death or news of death from the gods to the people. The bulbous eyes and erratic flying behaviour of the bird is attributed to it being squeezed by Māui for not revealing the whereabouts of his ancestress Mahuika, the fire deity. Later, when Māui attempts to achieve immortality by climbing through the goddess Hine-nui-te-pō, a group of fantails laugh at him as he enters her vagina. The goddess awakens and crushes him to death with her obsidian vaginal teeth.

Tiwakawaka is also the name of one of the first Māori settlers to New Zealand.

== Gallery ==
New Zealand fantail / Pīwakawaka

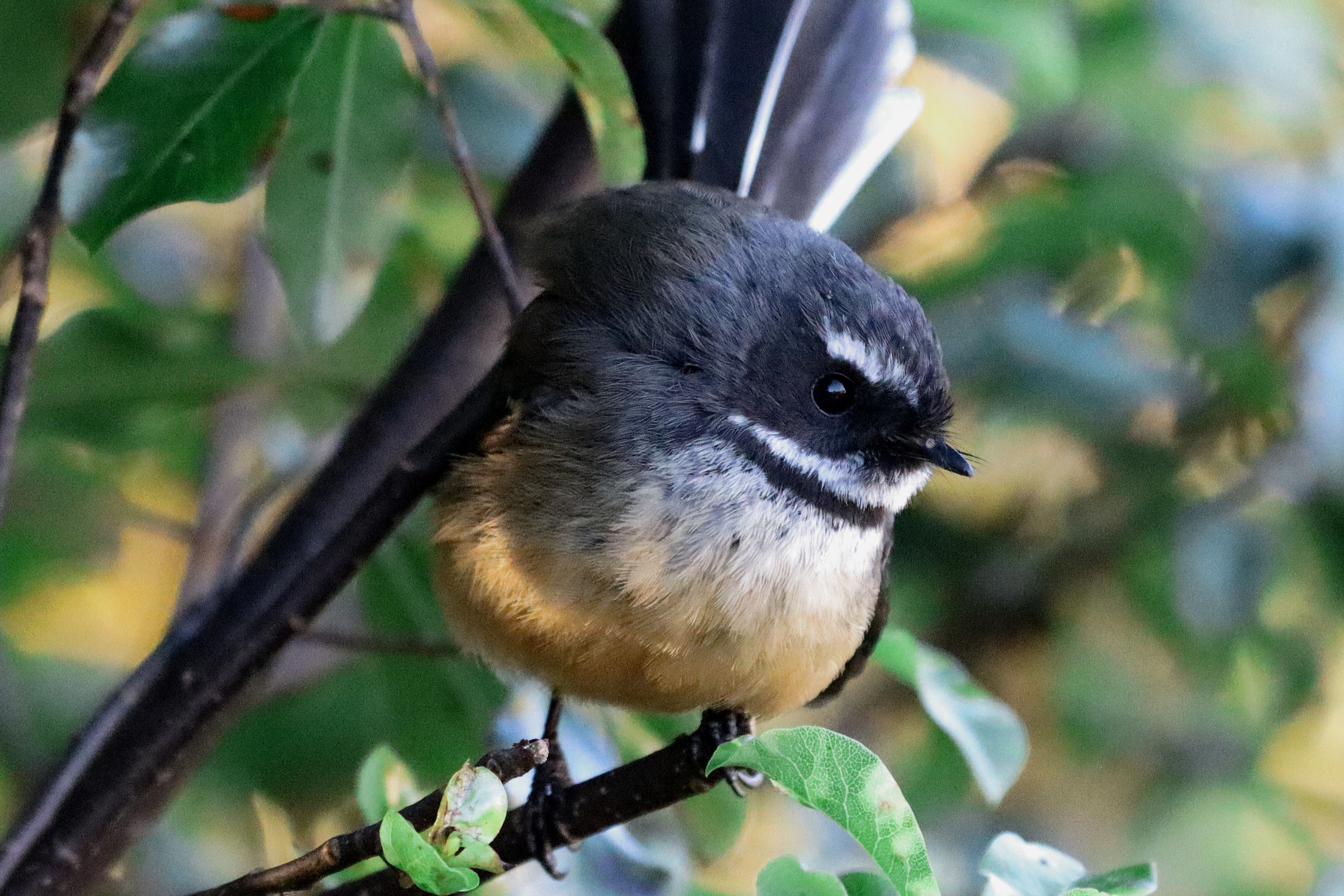

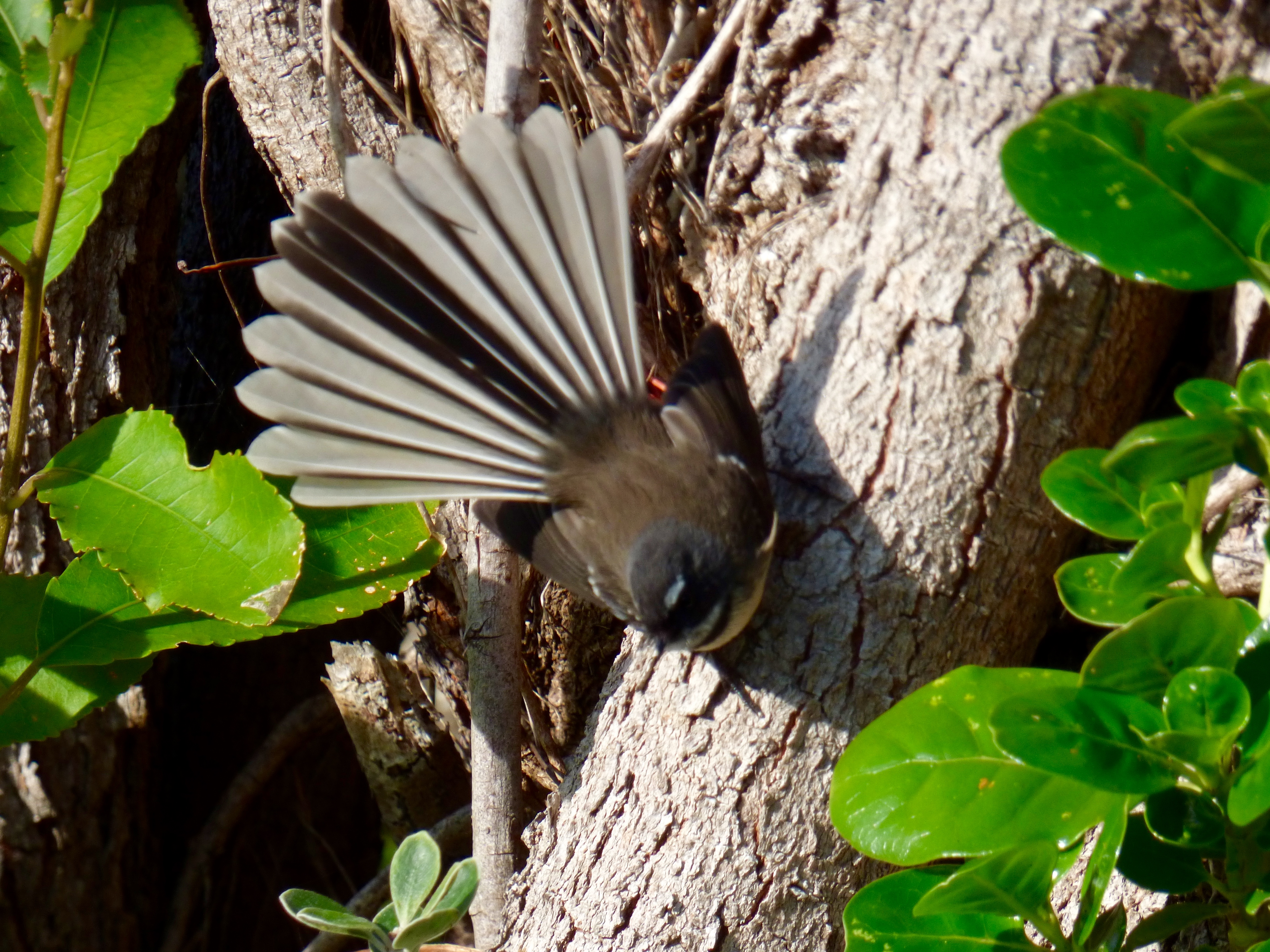

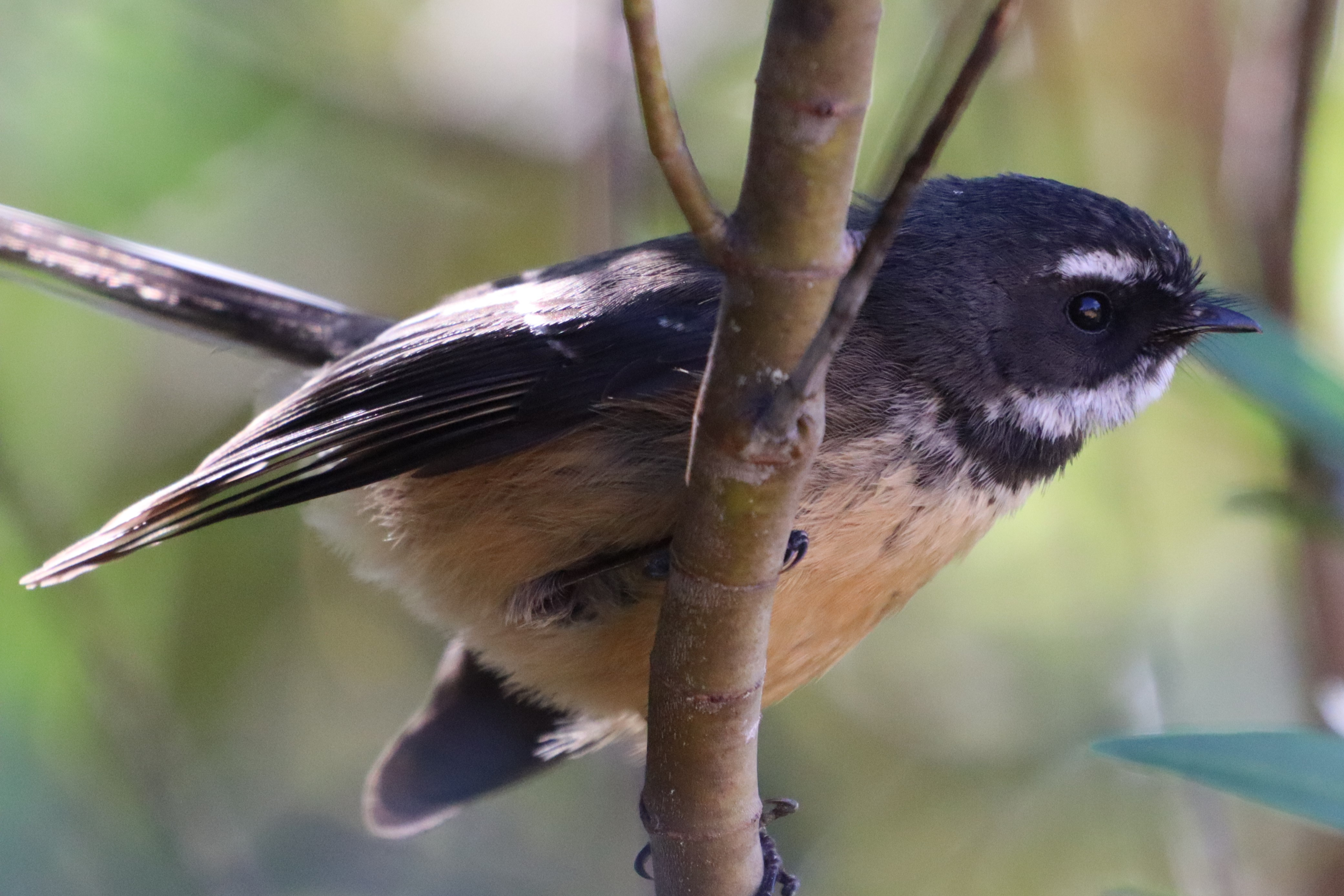

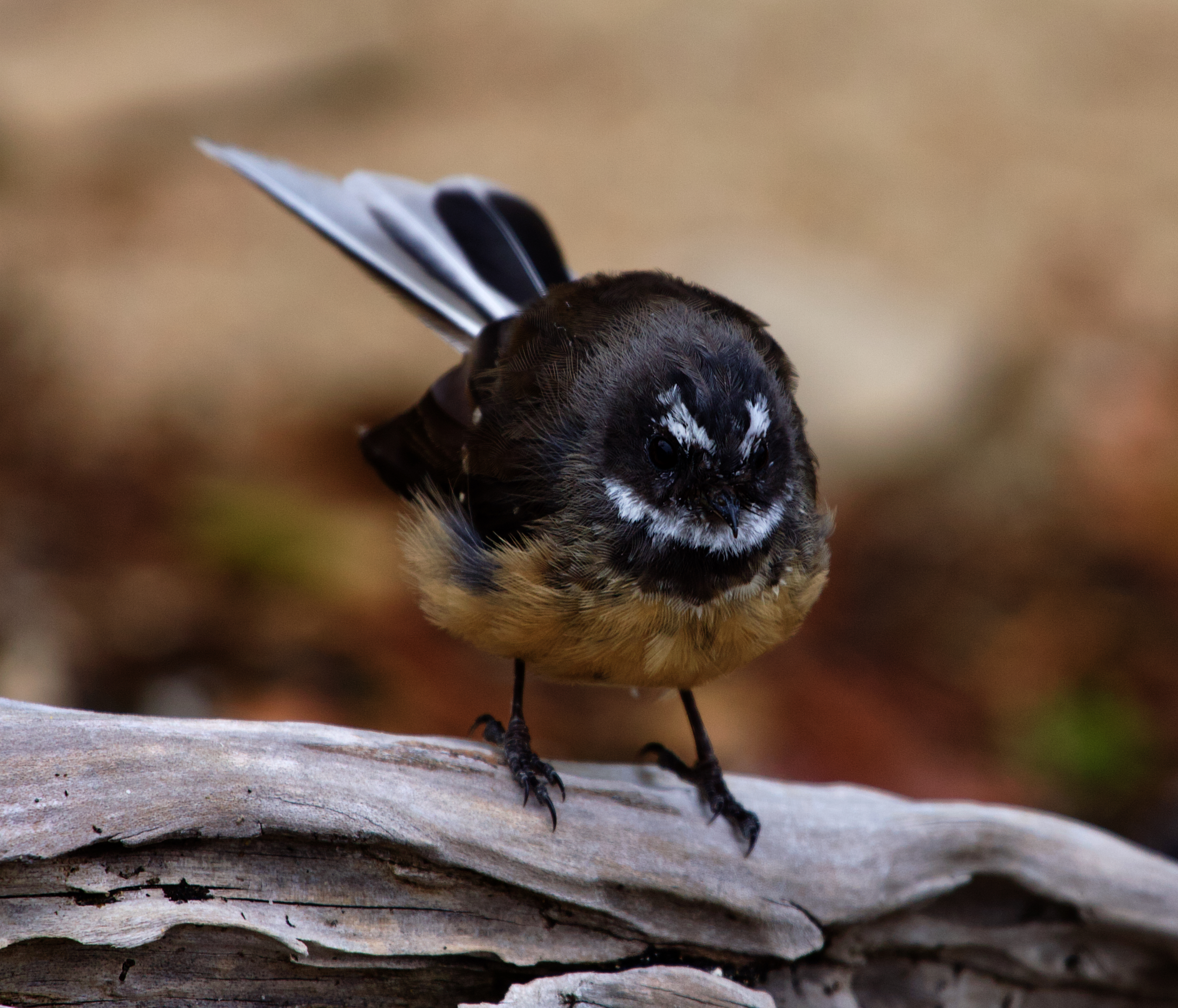

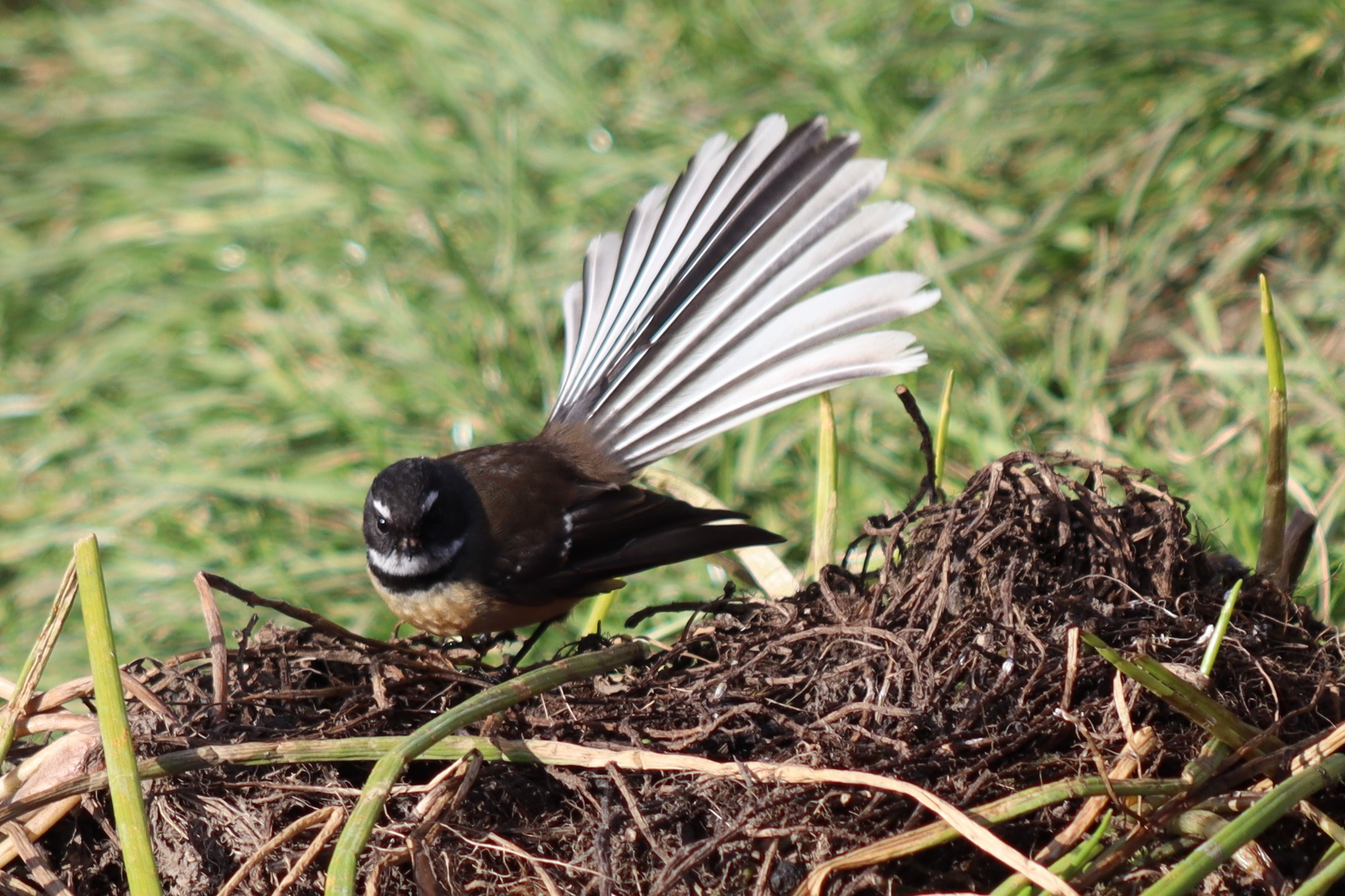

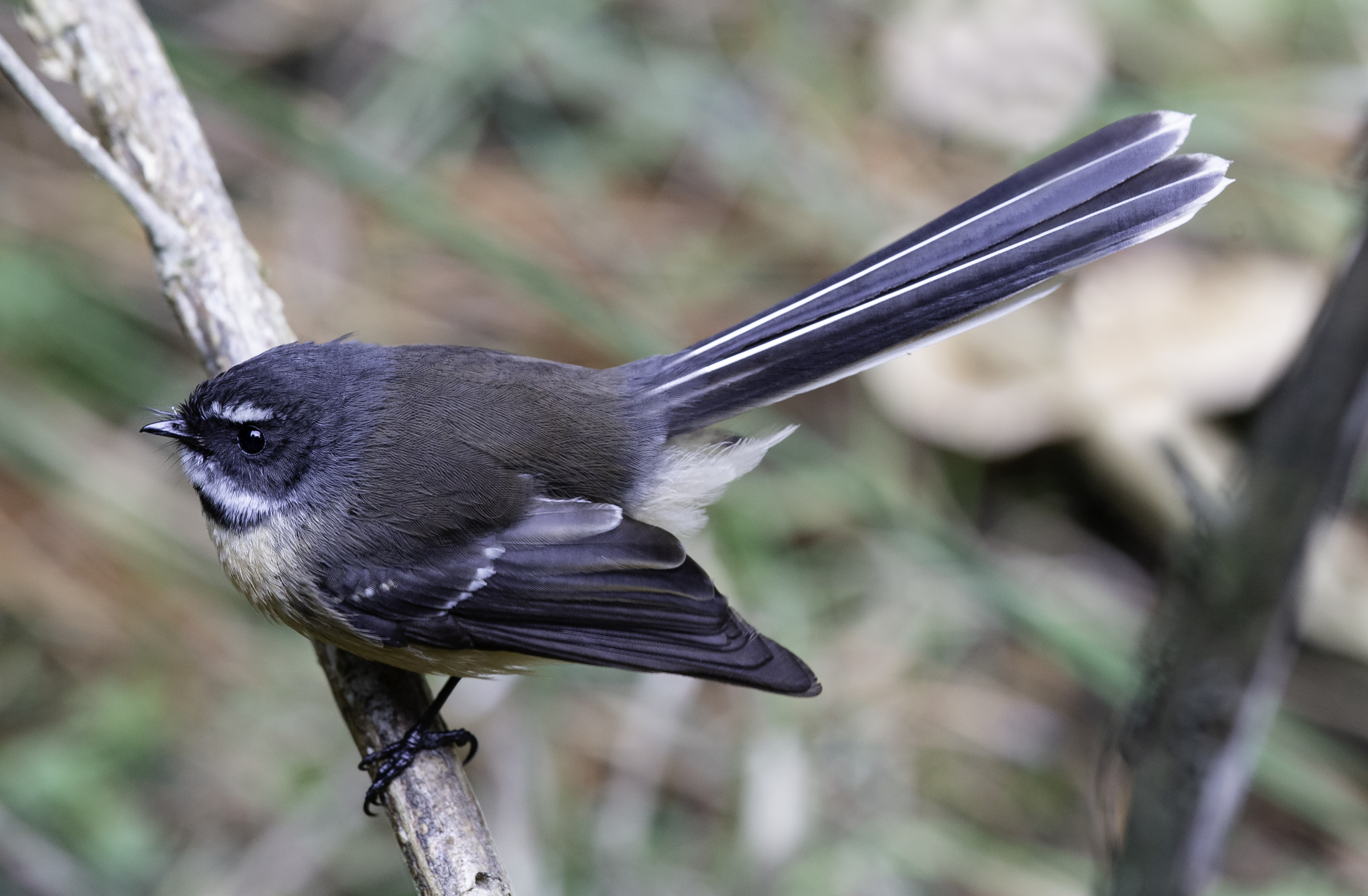

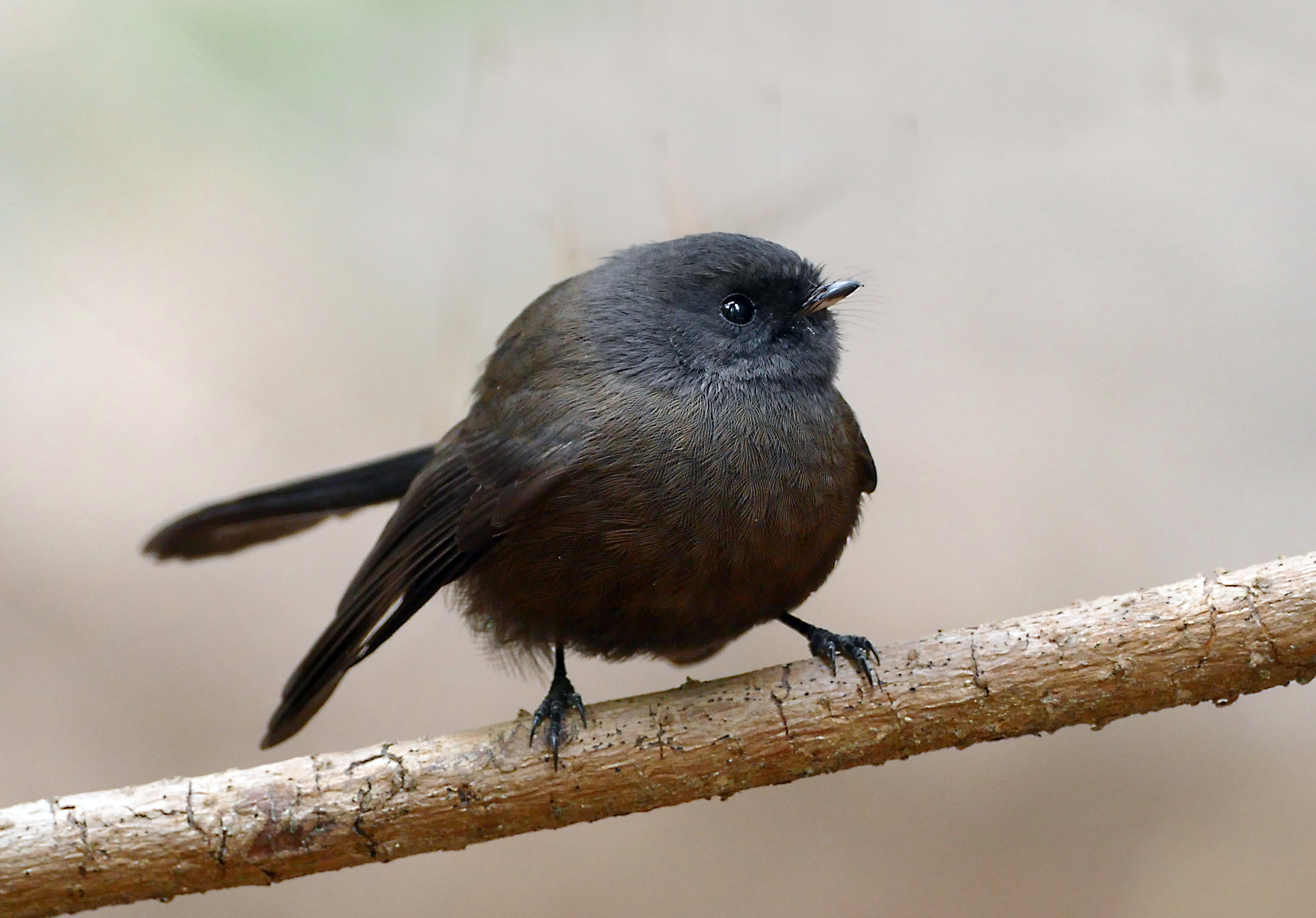
Black fantail

Tail fanned out, searching for insect

Video includes vocalisations.
