= List of fire deities =

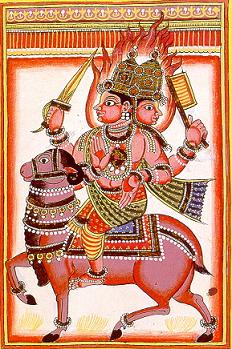
Agni, the Hindu deity of fire

This is a list of fire deities.

== African mythology ==
=== Bantu mythology ===
- Nyambe, god of the sun, fire and change
- Nzambi Mpungu (Kalûnga), god of the sun, fire, sky and change

=== Egyptian mythology ===
- Ra, fire god of the sun, light, warmth, and growth
- Sekhmet, protective lioness goddess of war, along with some elements of disease and curing of disease. Sometimes referenced in relation to the sun and its power, so possibly had to do with upkeep of the sun at times and fire
- Wadjet, the protective serpent goddess who sends fire to burn her enemies

=== Yoruba mythology ===
- Ogun, fire god and patron of blacksmiths, iron, warfare, metal tools
- Ọya, goddess of fire, wind, storms, fertility
- Shango, god of thunder, lightning and fire
- Aganju, god of volcanoes, magma, sunlight, and heat

=== Akan mythology ===
- Ayensu, three - headed god of the Ayensu river, sometimes associated with fire.
- Okraman, giver of fire, represented as a dog.
- Awia, god of and personification of the sun, son of the Creator god Nyame.

== Asian mythology ==
=== Ainu mythology ===
- Kamuy-huci, goddess of the fire

=== Chinese mythology ===
- Zhurong (Huoshen, God of Fire)
- Huilu (Huoshen, Goddess of Fire)
- Yandi (Huozhu, Accident of Fire)
- Shennong (Huozhu, Accident of Fire)
- Hua Guang Da Di
- Ebo (Huozheng, Primary Fire)
- Yùyōu (Huoqi, Energy of Fire)
- Bǐngdīngwèi Sīhuǒ Dàshén
- Yǐwǔwèi Sīhuǒ Dàdì
- Nánfāng Chìjīng Dìjūn

=== Filipino mythology ===
- Rirryaw Añitu: Ivatan place spirit Añitus who played music and sang inside a cave in Sabtang, while lighting up fire; believed to have change residences after they were disturbed by a man
- Bathala: the Tagalog supreme god and creator deity, also known as Bathala Maykapal, Lumilikha, and Abba; an enormous being with control over thunder, lightning, flood, fire, thunder, and earthquakes; presides over lesser deities and uses spirits to intercede between divinities and mortals
- Mangkukulam: a Tagalog divinity who pretends to be a doctor and emits fire
- Gugurang: the Bicolano supreme god; causes the pit of Mayon volcano to rumble when he is displeased; cut Mt. Malinao in hald with a thunderbolt; the god of good
- Unnamed God: a Bicolano sun god who fell in love with the mortal, Rosa; refused to light the world until his father consented to their marriage; he afterwards visited Rosa, but forgetting to remove his powers over fire, he accidentally burned Rosa's whole village until nothing but hot springs remained
- Makilum-sa-bagidan: the Bisaya god of fire
- Lalahon: the Bisaya goddess of fire, volcanoes, and the harvest; also referred as Laon
- Gunung: a Bisaya deity of volcanoes
- Taliyakud: the chief Tagbanwa god of the underworld who tends a fire between two tree trunks; asks the souls of the dead questions, where the soul's louse acts as the conscience that answers the questions truthfully; if the soul is wicked, it is pitched and burned, but if it is good, it passes on to a happier place with abundant food
- Diwata: general term for Tagbanwa deities; they created the first man made from earth and gave him the elements of fire, the flint-like stones, iron, and tinder, as well as rice and most importantly, rice-wine, which humans could use to call the deities and the spirits of their dead
- Unnamed Gods: the Bagobo gods whose fires create smoke that becomes the white clouds, while the sun creates yellow clouds that make the colors of the rainbow
- Cumucul: the T'boli son of the supreme deities; has a cohort of fire, a sword and shield; married to Boi’Kafil
- Segoyong: the Teduray guardians of the classes of natural phenomena; punishes humans to do not show respect and steal their wards; many of them specialize in a class, which can be water, trees, grasses, caves behind waterfalls, land caves, snakes, fire, nunuk trees, deer, and pigs

=== Hindu mythology ===
- Agneya, daughter of Agni and guardian of the south-east
- Agni, god of fire, messengers, and purification
- Ilā, goddess of speech and nourishment invoked during the agni-hotra ceremony
- Makara Jyothi, a star revered on a festival
- Svaha, goddess wife of Agni
- Jwala Ji, goddess wife of Mangala
- Jyoti, goddess younger sister of Kartikeya

=== Khanty mythology ===
- Nay-Angki - goddess of fire.

=== Korean mythology ===
- Jowangsin, goddess of the hearth fires

=== Japanese mythology ===
- Amaterasu, goddess of the sun
- Kagu-tsuchi (kami), blacksmith god of fire whose birth burned his mother Izanami to death
- Kōjin, god of fire, hearth, and the kitchen
- Konohanasakuya-hime, goddess of volcanoes

=== Mongolian mythology ===
- Arshi Tenger, god of fire associated with shamanic rituals
- Odqan, red god of fire who rides on a brown goat
- Yal-un Eke, mother goddess of fire who is Odqan's counterpart

=== Nivkhi mythology ===
- Turgmam, goddess of fire

=== Persian mythology ===
- Atar, yazata of fire in Persian mythology and Zoroastrianism

=== Taiwanese mythology ===
- Komod Pazik, Sakizaya god of fire
- Icep Kanasaw, Sakizaya goddess of fire

=== Turkic mythology ===
- Alaz, god of fire
- Od Iyesi, familiar spirits who protect fires
- Ut, Siberian goddess of the hearth
- Vut-Ami, Chuvash goddess of fires.

=== Vietnamese mythology ===
- Ông Táo, god of stove and fire
- Bà Hỏa, goddess of fire
- Quang Hoa Mã Nguyên Súy, god of preventing fire-related accidents
- Nam Phương Xích Đế, fire god

== European mythology ==
=== Albanian mythology ===
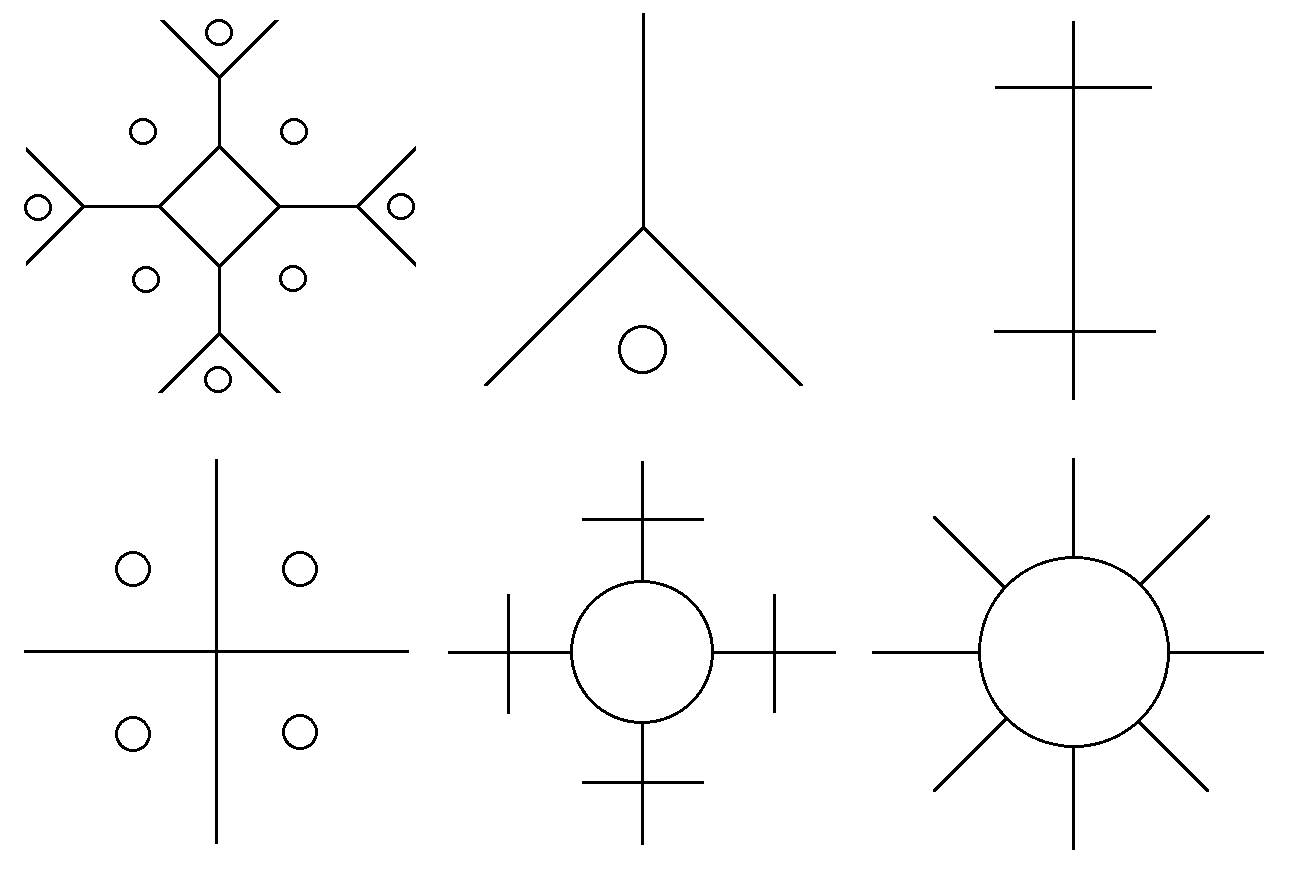
Sun (Dielli) and Fire (Zjarri) symbols in Albanian traditional tattoo patterns (19th century). The cross (also swastika in some tattoos) is the Albanian traditional way to represent the deified Fire – Zjarri, evidently also called with the theonym Enji.

- Enji, Zjarri, fire god: releaser of light and heat with the power to ward off darkness and evil, affect cosmic phenomena, and give strength to the Sun, and sustainer of the continuity between life and afterlife and between the generations
- I Verbti, "the blind one", adjectival noun also used for the fire and wind god
- Nëna e Vatrës, "the Mother of the Hearth", protector of the hearth
- Gjarpri e Vatrës, "the Serpent of the Hearth", protector of the hearth

=== Basque mythology ===
- Eate, god of fire and storms

=== Caucasian mythology ===
- Alpan, Lezghin (Dagestanian) goddess of fire
- Kamar, Georgian fire goddess who was kidnapped by Amirani
- Uorsar, Adyghe goddess of the earth
- Wine Gwasche, Circassian goddess who protects the hearth

=== Celtic mythology ===
- Aed, Irish god whose name means "fire"
- Brigit, Irish goddess of fire, poetry, arts, and crafts
- Grannus, god of fire, health, water springs, and the sun
- Nantosuelta, goddess of fire, nature, fertility, rivers and the earth

=== Etruscan mythology ===
- Sethlans, fire god of smithing and crafts
- Śuri, fire god and chthonic light god, with powers over health and plague

=== Greek mythology ===
- Helios, god and personification of the Sun
- Hephaestus, god of blacksmiths, crafting, fire, and volcanoes, Roman form Vulcan
- Hestia, goddess of the hearth and its fires, Roman form Vesta
- Apollo, god of the Sun, healing, prophecy, and writing

=== Lithuanian mythology ===
- Dimstipatis, protector of the house, housewives, and the hearth against fire outbreaks
- Gabija, protective goddess of the hearth and the household
- Jagaubis, household spirit of fire and the furnace
- Moterų Gabija, goddess of bakeries and bread
- Pelenų Gabija, goddess of fireplaces
- Praurimė, goddess of the sacred fire served by her priestesses, the vaidilutės
- Trotytojas Kibirkščių, deity of sparks and fires

=== Norse mythology ===
- Glöð, jötunn who is the wife of Logi and who rules with him
- Logi, jötunn who personifies fire
- Surtr, jötunn king who ruled the volcanic powers of the underworld and will cover the Earth in fire during Ragnarök

=== Ossetian mythology ===
- Safa, god of the hearth chain
- Mariel, Fire goddess

=== Roman mythology ===
- Caca, goddess who was Vulcan's daughter and who might have been worshipped before Vesta
- Cacus, god who was the fire-breathing giant son of Vulcan, and who might have been worshipped in ancient times
- Fornax, goddess of the furnace
- Sol, personification and god of the Sun
- Stata Mater, goddess who stops fires
- Vesta, goddess of the hearth and its fire, Roman form of Hestia.
- Vulcan, god of crafting and fire, Roman form of Hephaestus

=== Sicilian mythology ===
- Adranus, god formerly worshipped in Adranus, near Mount Etna

=== Slavic mythology ===
- Dazhbog, the regenerating god of the solar fire who rides in the sky
- Kresnik, golden fire god who became a hero of Slovenia
- Ognyena Maria, fire goddess who assists Perun
- Peklenc, god of fire who rules the underworld and its wealth and who judges and punishes the wicked through earthquakes
- Svarog, the bright god of fire, smithing, and the sun, and is sometimes considered as the creator
- Svarožič, the god of the earthly fire

== Middle Eastern mythology ==
=== Canaanite mythology ===
- Ishat, Phoenician fire and drought goddess slain by Anat
- Shapash, goddess of the sun
- Yahweh, according to some biblical scholars he was originally a deity of volcanoes and metallurgy

=== Hittite mythology ===
- Arinitti, sun goddess of the city of Arinna, and the goddess of hearth fires, temple flames, and chthonic fires in later times.

=== Mesopotamian mythology ===
- Girra, god of fire in Akkadian and Babylonian records
- Gibil, skilled god of fire and smithing in Sumerian records
- Ishum, god of fire who was the brother of the sun god Shamash, and an attendant of Erra
- Nusku, god of heavenly and earthly fire and light, and patron of the arts
- Shamash, ancient Mesopotamian Sun god

== Native American mythology ==
=== Aztec mythology ===
- Chantico, goddess of the hearth fires and volcanoes
- Mixcoatl, hunting god who introduced fire to humanity
- Xiuhtecuhtli, god of fire, day, heat, volcanoes, food in famine, the year, turquoise, the Aztec emperors, and the afterlife

=== Huichol mythology ===
- Tatewari, fire god of shamans

=== Mayan mythology ===
- Huracán, fire god of storms and wind who created and destroyed humanity
- Jacawitz, fire god who was a companion of the sun god Tohil

=== Navajo mythology ===
- Black God, frail stellar fire god who introduced the fire drill to humanity

=== Purépecha mythology ===
- Curicaueri, the primordial fire that originates the sun. Main deity of the purépecha people of central Mexico.

=== Quechua mythology ===
- Manqu Qhapaq, fire and sun god who founded the Inca civilization and introduced technology to humanity
- Mama Nina, Her name means "Mother of fire" in quechua, she's the goddess of fire, light and volcanoes

== Oceanian mythology ==
=== Fijian mythology ===
- Gedi, fire and fertility god who taught humanity to use fire

=== Hawaiian mythology ===
- Pele, goddess of fire, wind, and volcanoes

=== Māori mythology ===
- Auahitūroa, god of fire and comets and husband of Mahuika
- Mahuea, goddess of fire
- Mahuika, goddess of fire who was tricked into revealing to her grandson Māui the knowledge of fire
- Ngā Mānawa, five fire gods who are sons of Auahitūroa and Mahuika
- Rūaumoko, god of volcanoes and earthquakes

=== Samoan mythology ===
- Ti'iti'i, god of fire that brought fire to people of Samoa after a battle with the earthquake god, Mafui'e.

== See also ==
- Ekendriya
- Fire (classical element)
- Fire temple
- Fire worship
- Solar deity
