= Te Manawa =

Te Manawa (Māori: The Heart) and its plural, Ngā Manawa are the name of several community organisations around New Zealand, including:

- Te Manawa, Palmerston North, a museum and science centre in Palmerston North
- Te Manawa (Westgate), a library and community hub in Auckland
- Whangārei Art Museum Te Manawa Toi, an art museum in Whangārei
- Te Manawa o Te Wheke, an Anglican episcopal diocese in New Zealand

The term is also found in more general Māori culture:

- Ngā Mānawa, the fire children in Māori mythology

== See also ==
- Manawa (disambiguation)
