= Manawa =

Manawa can refer to:

- Manawa, Wisconsin, a city in Wisconsin
- Manawa (crustacean): Manawa Hornibrook, 1949, a genus of ostracod
- Manawa Forster, 1970 an invalid genus of spider: now Mesudus Özdikmen, 2007
- Manawa Bergquist & Fromont, 1988, an invalid genus of sponge: now Pyloderma Kirkpatrick, 1907
- Manawa is the Māori name of the grey mangrove tree, Avicennia marina
- Ngā Mānawa, the fire children in Māori mythology
- Travis Manawa, fictional character in Fear the Walking Dead
- Christopher Manawa, fictional character in Fear the Walking Dead
- Liza Manawa, fictional character in Fear the Walking Dead
- Manawa Energy, a New Zealand electricity company

== See also ==
- Te Manawa (disambiguation)
