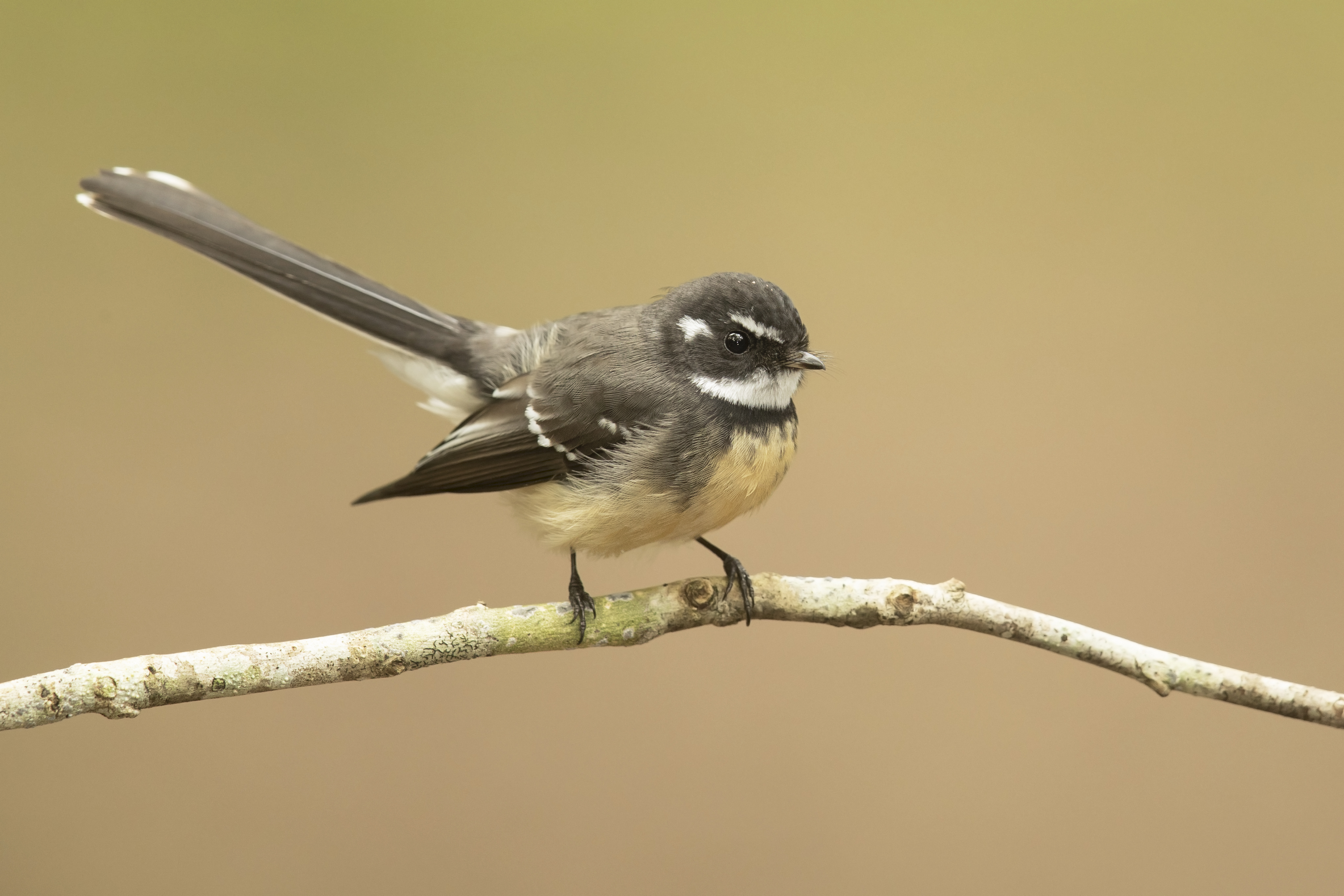
- Rhipidura albiscapa albicauda

Conservation status
- Least Concern (IUCN 3.1)

Scientific classification
- Kingdom: Animalia
- Phylum: Chordata
- Class: Aves
- Order: Passeriformes
- Family: Rhipiduridae
- Genus: Rhipidura
- Species: R. albiscapa

Binomial name
- Rhipidura albiscapa Gould, 1840

Synonyms
- Rhipidura fuliginosa

= Grey fantail =

Species of bird

The grey fantail (Rhipidura albiscapa) is a small insectivorous bird. There is no sexual dimorphism. It is a common fantail found in Australia, the Solomon Islands, Vanuatu and New Caledonia. The species is considered by many to be conspecific with the New Zealand fantail (Rhipidura fuliginosa); however, differences in its calls lead some authorities to treat it as a separate species. The studies of grey fantail in 1999 by Richard Schodde and Ian Mason recommended that Tasmanian grey fantail was formally classified as R. albiscapa and New Zealand fantails populations as R. fuliginosa

== Description ==
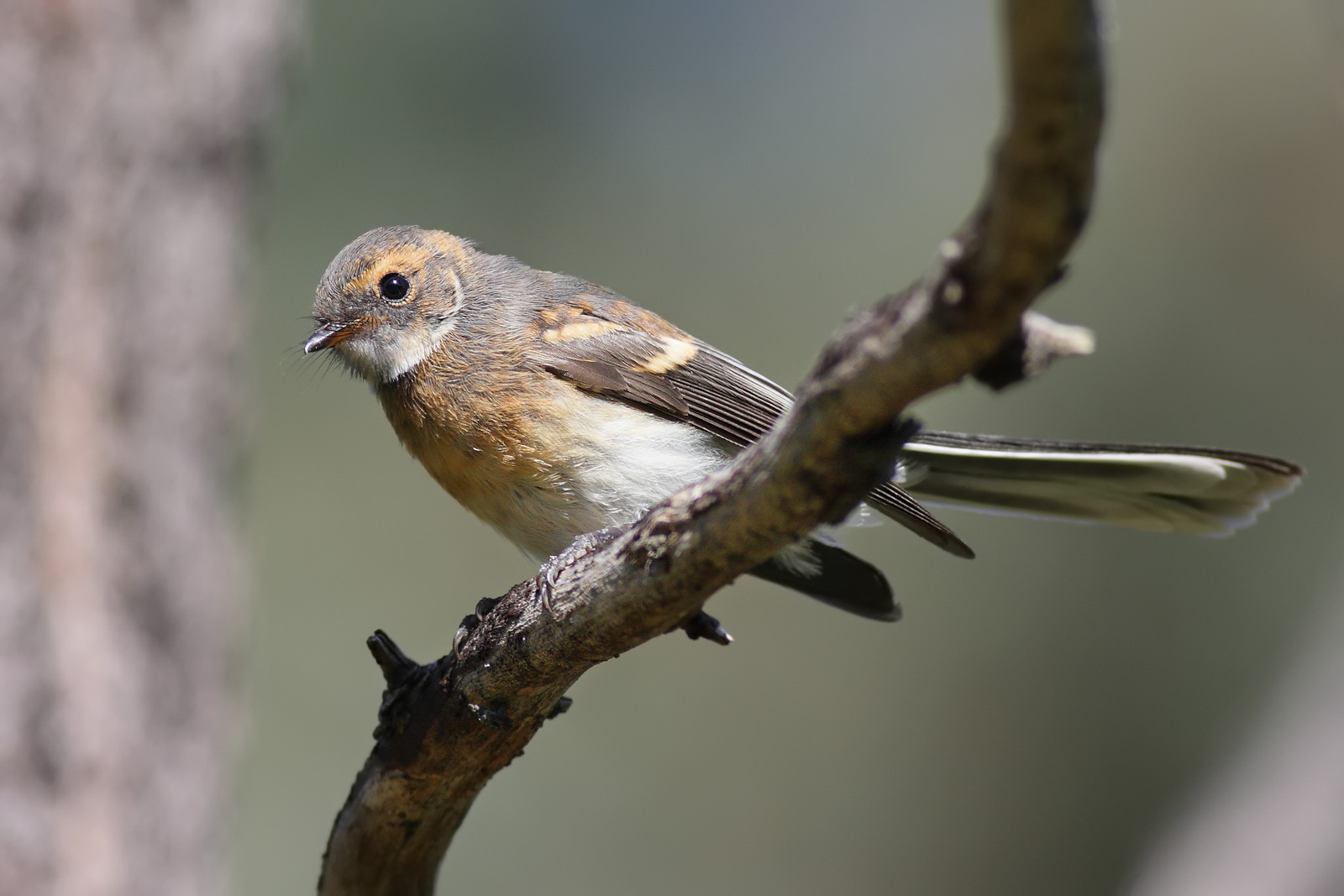
Juvenile

This species is mid-to-dark grey or grey-brown above, lighter (often yellowish/orange) below, with a white throat, white markings over the eye, and with (depending on the race) either white-edged or entirely white outer tail feathers. It grows to 16 cm (6.3 in) in length, of which half is the tail, which, as the name implies, is often displayed fanned out. This reveals that the outer tail feathers are light and the centre ones are dark. Some races, such as keasti, have a darker plumage.

This species is easily seen while walking in eucalypt forest, rainforest, mangroves, heath, and wooded habitat. During waking hours, they are almost never still. They flit from perch to perch, sometimes on the ground but mostly on the twigs of a tree or any other convenient object, looking out for flying insects. They are able to catch flying insects using intricate acrobatic chases. The birds are not shy, and will often flit within a few metres of people, especially in forested areas and suburban gardens. In doing so, it is able to catch any small flying insects that may have been disturbed by human activities such as walking or digging. The bird's call is an almost metallic cheek, either as a single sound or (more often) repeated as a chattering.

== Taxonomy ==
=== Genetics ===
The populations of Australian fantails are complex and they were all formerly considered conspecific due to their being closely related based on their song, habitat, tail coloration, and clutch size. A recent study shows that R.fuliginosa in New Zealand and Australian R.albiscapa were sister taxa and another fantail species, named R.phasiana in the north coast of Australia, was sister to these two fantail species. Besides, within this subgroup R. albiscapa from Vanuatu and Australia were paraphyletic. Hence, R. albiscapa was found to be polyphyletic.

=== Geographically isolated units ===
Numerous birds of southern Australia are characterised by a known biogeographical barrier, the Nullarbor Plain, displaying morphological divergence of subspecies differentiation. Because of the east-west division due to the geographic barrier effect on their morphological divergence, the populations of R. albiscapa could be classified into five subspecies by their characteristics, such as their calls, patterns of plumage, and nest construction.

Five subpopulations of R. albiscapa are shown below:

Rhipidura albiscapa keasti (eastern Australia)

Rhipidura albiscapa albicauda (Inland western Australia)

Rhipidura albiscapa preissi (South western Australia)

Rhipidura albiscapa alisteri (eastern Australia)

Rhipidura albiscapa albiscapa (Tasmania)

== Life cycle ==
=== Nesting ===
Most bird species typically build one nest, whereas grey fantails commonly build more than one nest before egg-laying, and seven nests have been recorded as the highest number in a breeding season. In a recent study, there is a hypothesis explaining nest abandonment in this species. Abandoned nests could be used for confusing predators. In fact, a large number of abandoned nests exposed on trees are significantly less concealed than nests that eventually received eggs. However, these abandoned nests were incompletely built, probably in response to the attention of predators (such as pied currawongs), because these predators may destroy incomplete nests when looking for eggs. In addition, pied currawongs are larger than grey fantails, which presents a considerable risk for adult grey fantails. Therefore, desertion might be an adaptation of grey fantails, with these nests used for eliminating hazards from cryptic predation. Some of the materials from decoy nests could be used to construct the subsequent breeding nest. The location of the breeding nest varies during the nest-building phase, ensuring a site with sufficient security to prepare for breeding. The parent birds build compact, cup-shaped nests, usually in the forks of trees, made from moss, bark and fibre, and often completed with spider's web. According to the records of the sizes of the nests by Richard and Donaghey, which were observed in three regions of southern Australia, the average size of nests were 5.7 cm (5.1-6.4 cm) external diameter, 4.1 cm (3.8-4.4 cm) internal diameter, and 2.9 cm (2.5-3.2 cm) internal depth.

=== Breeding ===
The grey fantail is territorial and it is a seasonal breeder. They raise several broods per season, usually each of three or four cream eggs, spotted grey and brown. The incubation period is around two weeks, with incubation and feeding duties shared by both parents. During the breeding season, the mass of testes of male grey fantails grows larger than in the non-breeding season. The growth of testes sizes could be subject to sperm competition, similar to other species exhibiting morphological traits. Male birds also have pronounced cloacal protuberances. This change of morphology is associated with polygynandry and the increase in copulation chance. Despite most grey fantails forming season-long monogamous pairs, a small number of male birds seeking extra-pair copulation have been recorded. To seek extra-pair copulation, the male bird invades neighbouring territories and waits at the nest where the female birds were not incubating. The intruding male might coerce a resident female into accepting extra-pair male copulation. Moreover, the aggression of the male bird could act as a deterrent to the female bird, leading to delayed ovulation, allowing the male to re-mate. This increases the likelihood of the male becoming the sole fertiliser of that female's eggs.

=== Migration ===
The southeastern populations of R. albiscapa in Australia and Tasmania are migratory. The southwestern subspecies R. a .preissi is mostly resident while the Queensland subspecies R. a. keasti is resident. R. a. alisteri migrates north and west in autumn, returning in spring. R. a. albicauda is an inland nomad. The subpopulation of R. a. albiscapa breeds mainly in Tasmania. When winter comes, they migrate to New South Wales and form groups with other sub-populations of R. a. alisteri.

A small number of R. a. preissi individuals (a subspecies recognized in southwestern Australia) have also been recorded in the subpopulation of R. a. keasti and R. a. alisteri.

== Gallery ==
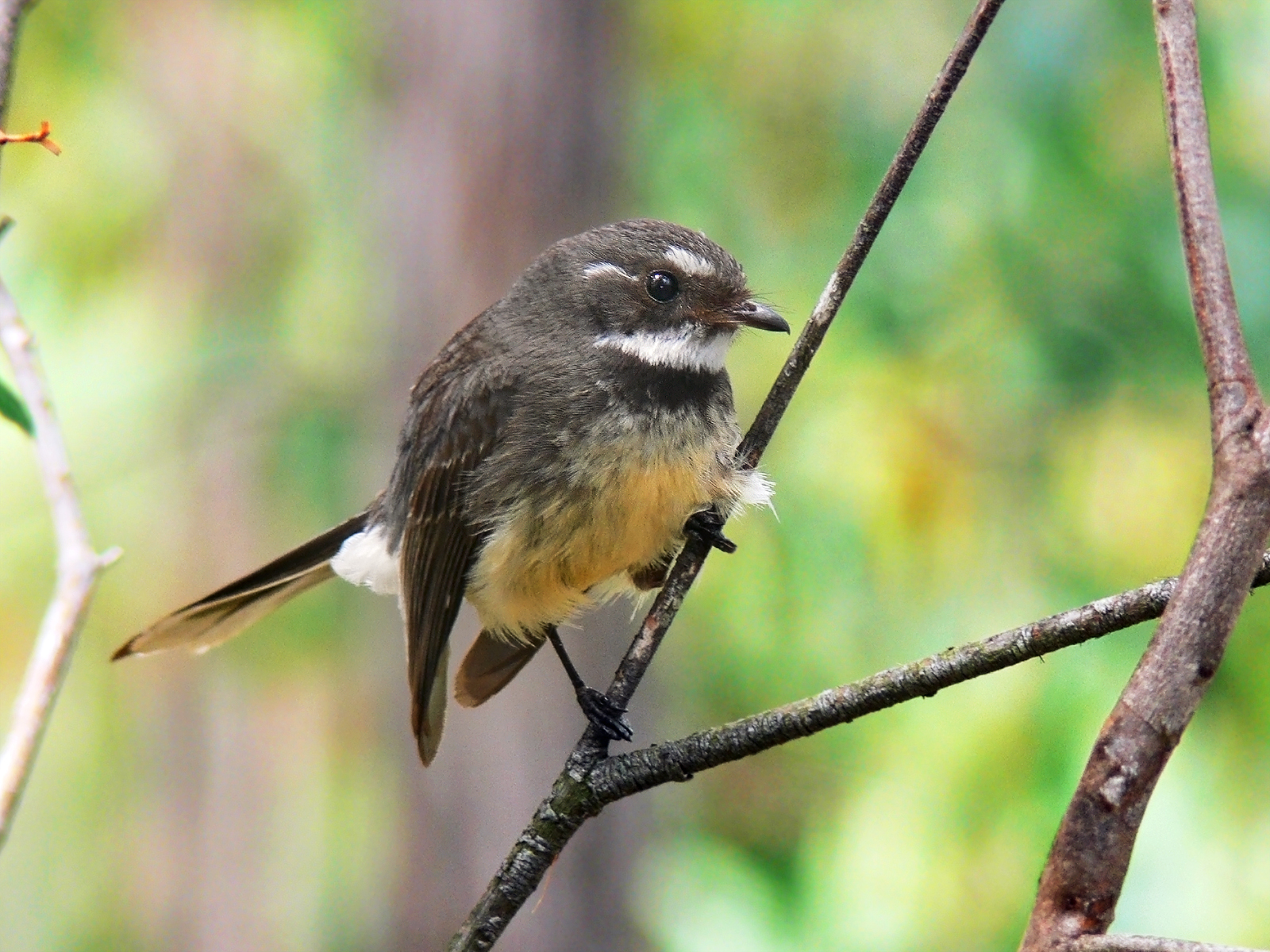

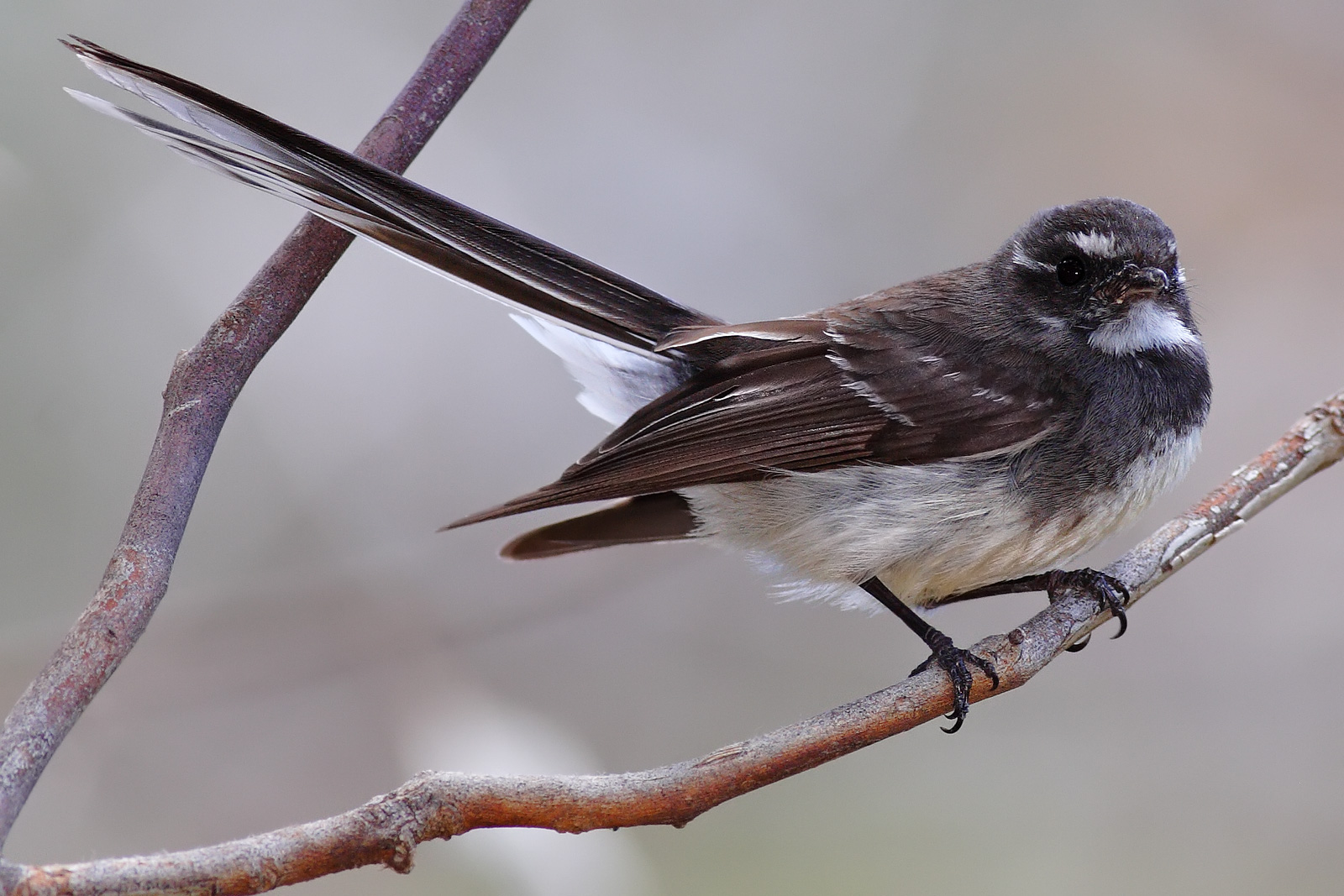

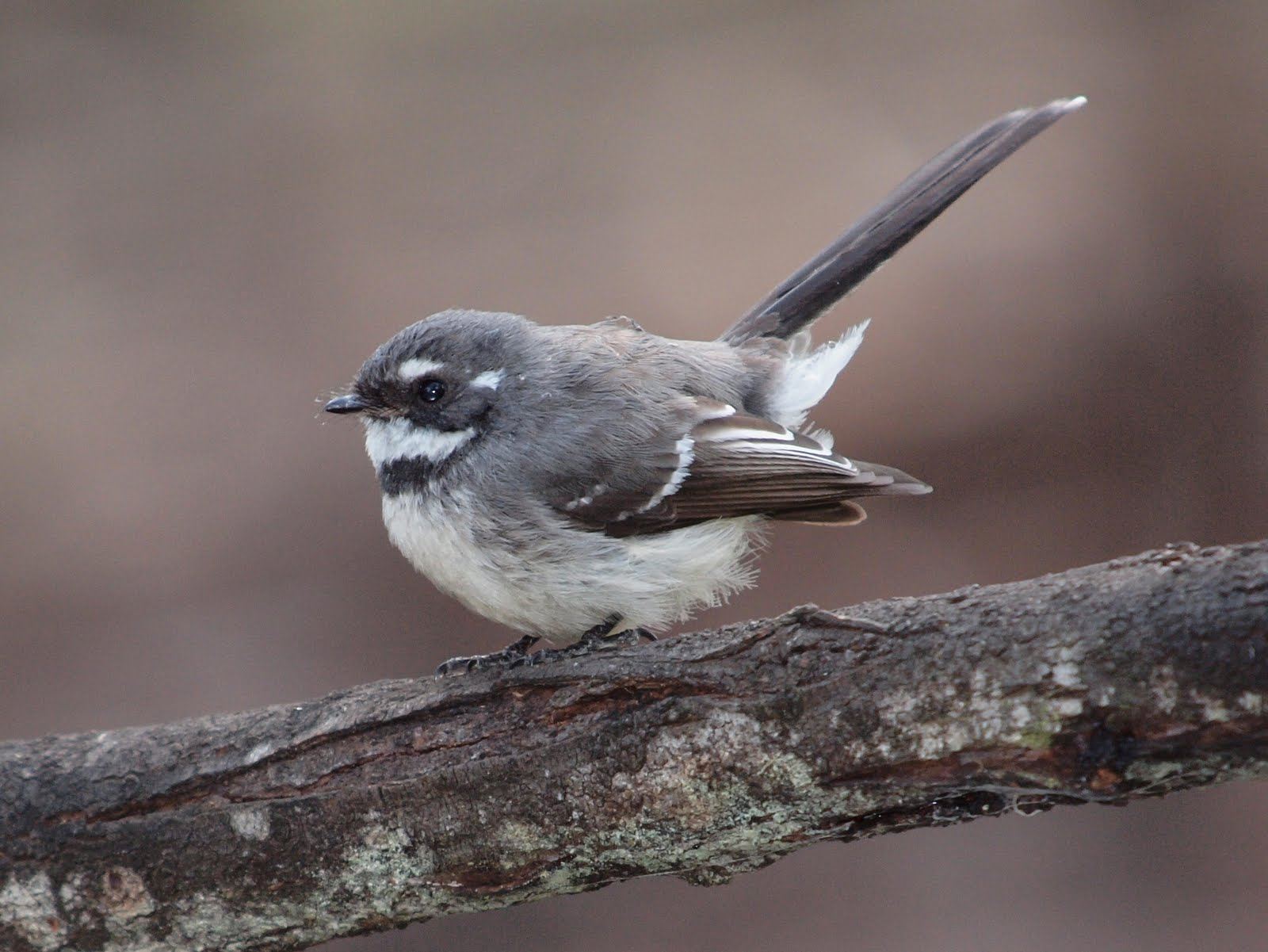
