= Haka =

Traditional Māori dance or performance art

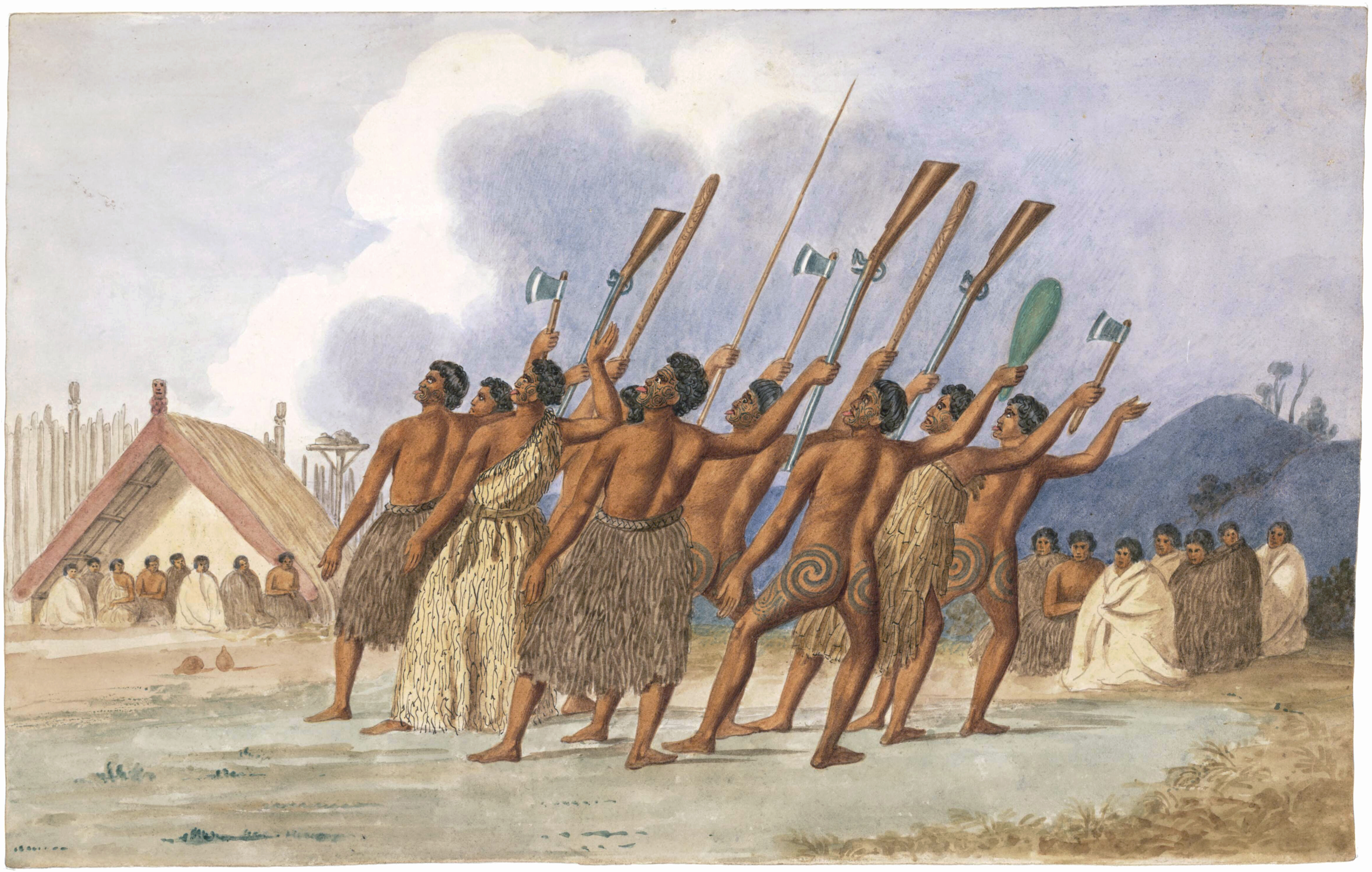
Haka is a traditional genre of Māori dance. This painting dates from c. 1845.

Haka (/ˈhɑːkə/; singular and plural haka, in both Māori and New Zealand English) are a variety of ceremonial dances in Maoli, Maohi, and Māori culture. A performance art, haka are often performed by a group, with vigorous movements and stamping of the feet with rhythmically shouted accompaniment. Haka have been traditionally performed by both men and women for a variety of social functions throughout Polynesia. They are performed to welcome distinguished guests, or to acknowledge great achievements, occasions, or funerals.

In New Zealand, kapa haka groups are common in schools. The main Māori performing arts competition, Te Matatini, takes place every two years.

All Blacks performing a haka (Dunedin, 2014)

The first recorded public performances of a group haka outside of New Zealand were made in 1884 by the New Zealand rugby union team during its visit to Sydney in Australia. New Zealand sports teams' practice of performing a haka to challenge opponents before international matches has made the dance form more widely known around the world, particularly by the New Zealand rugby union team (known as the All Blacks). Although popularly associated with the traditional battle preparations of male warriors, conceptions that haka are typically war dances are considered erroneous by Māori scholars, alongside the inaccurate performance of haka by non-Māori.

== Etymology ==
The group of people performing a haka is referred to as a kapa haka (kapa meaning group or team, and also rank or row). The Māori word haka has cognates in other Polynesian languages, for example: Samoan saʻa (saʻasaʻa), Tokelauan haka, Rarotongan ʻaka, Hawaiian haʻa, Marquesan haka, meaning 'to be short-legged' or 'dance'; all from Proto-Polynesian saka, from Proto-Malayo-Polynesian sakaŋ, meaning 'bowlegged'.

== History and practice ==
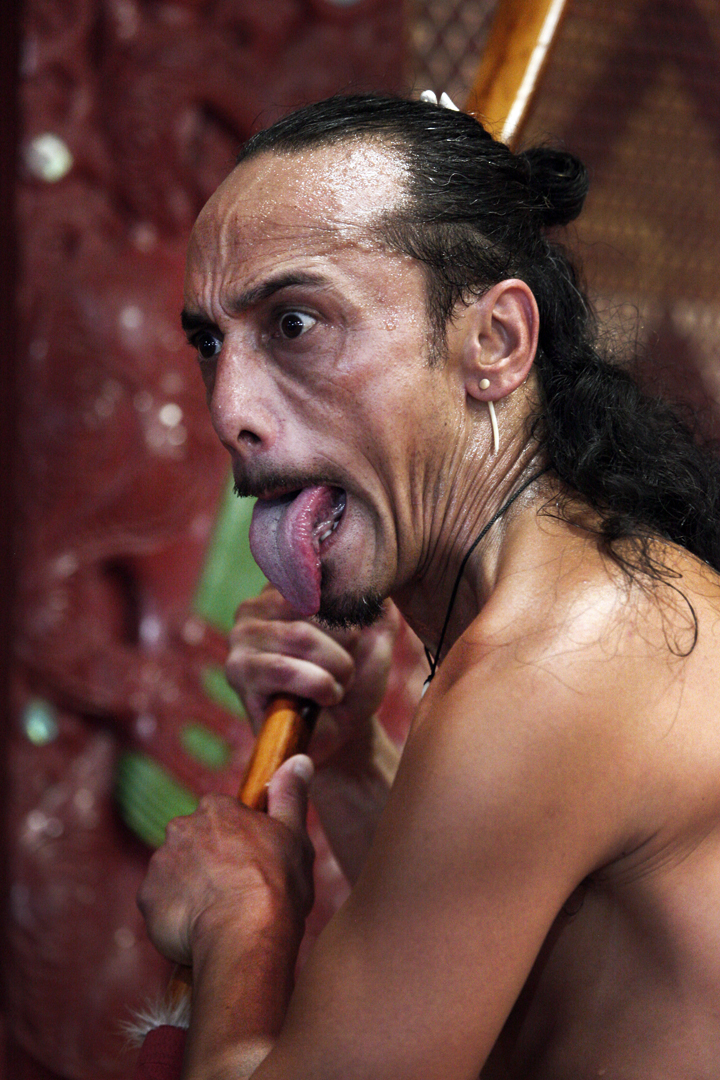
When performed by men, haka features protruding of the tongue.

=== Overview ===
Haka is a form of indigenous dance that encompasses multiple ceremonial purposes in Māori culture. As Nathan Matthew explains, "it is a posture dance accompanied by chanted or shouted song... One of the main characteristics of haka are that actions involving all parts of the body are used to emphasise the words."

=== Origins in Māori tradition ===
According to Māori tradition, haka originated from a creation story. The sun god, Tama-nui-te-rā, had two wives, the Summer Maid, Hine-raumati, and the Winter Maid, Hine-takurua. Haka originated in the coming of Hine-raumati, whose presence on still, hot days was revealed in a quivering appearance in the air. This was haka of Tāne-rore, the son of Hine-raumati and Tama-nui-te-rā. Hyland comments that "the haka is (and also represents) a natural phenomena [sic]; on hot summer days, the 'shimmering' atmospheric distortion of air emanating from the ground is personified as 'Te Haka a Tānerore'".

=== Types and functions ===
Haka includes various forms serving different ceremonial purposes. These functions include:

- welcoming guests (haka pōwhiri),
- fare-welling and mourning the deceased (waiata tangi),
- giving advice or instructions (waiata tohutohu),
- restoring self-respect (pātere),
- intimidating adversaries (peruperu – war dance),
- and transmitting social and political messages (haka taparahi, ngeri).

The peruperu is a war haka that uses weapons, while haka taparahi is performed without weapons and is the more common ceremonial form. Other forms include:

- tūtū ngārahu (similar to peruperu but with sideways jumping),
- whakatū waewae (like peruperu with no jumping),
- manawa wera (like ngeri with no set actions, usually ceremonial and connected with death), and
- kaioraora (hatred or venting haka).

=== Performance elements ===
Various actions are employed in haka performance, including facial contortions such as showing the whites of the eyes (pūkana), and poking out the tongue (whetero, performed by men only), and a wide variety of vigorous body actions such as slapping the hands against the body and stomping of the feet. The body serves as the instrument and vessel of delivery, with the key aspect being the words and the message they contain.

=== 18th and 19th centuries ===
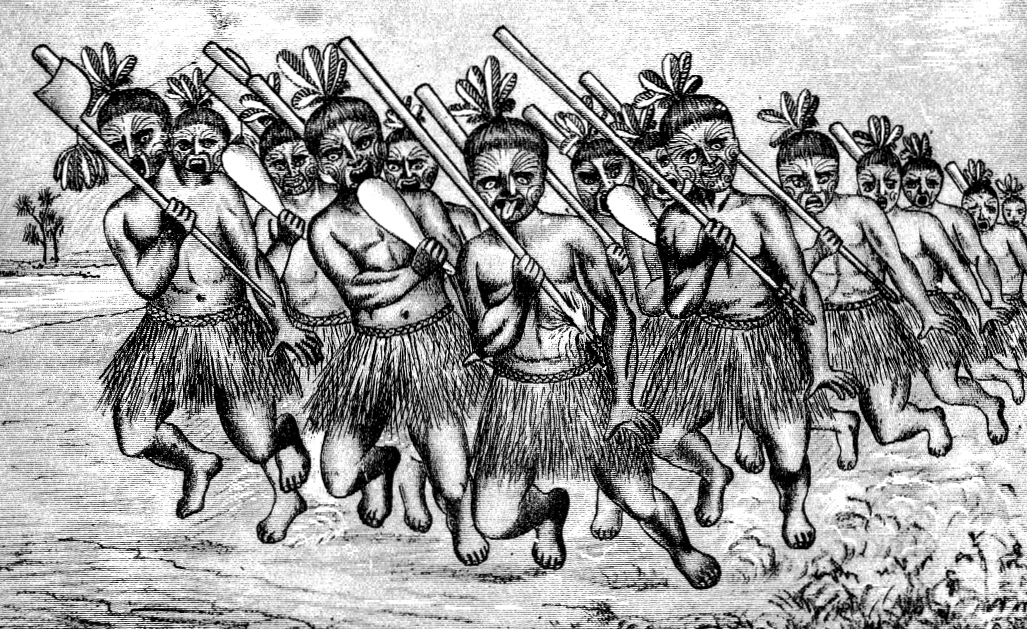
19th-century illustration of a haka, c. 1890

The earliest Europeans to witness haka described them as being "vigorous" and "ferocious". Joseph Banks, who accompanied James Cook on his first voyage to New Zealand in 1769, later recorded:

The War Song and dance consists of Various contortions of the limbs during which the tongue is frequently thrust out incredibly far and the orbits of the eyes enlarged so much that a circle of white is distinctly seen round the Iris: in short nothing is omitted which can render a human shape frightful and deformed, which I suppose they think terrible.

From their arrival in the early 19th century, Christian missionaries tried to eradicate haka, along with other forms of Māori culture that they saw as conflicting with Christian beliefs and practice. Henry Williams, the leader of the Church Missionary Society mission in New Zealand, aimed to replace haka and traditional Māori chants (waiata) with hymns. Missionaries also encouraged European harmonic singing as part of the process of conversion.

The use of haka in welcoming ceremonies for members of the British royal family helped to improve its standing among Europeans. Prince Alfred, the Duke of Edinburgh, was the first royal to visit New Zealand, in 1869. Upon the Duke's arrival at the wharf in Wellington, he was greeted by a vigorous haka. The Wellington Independent reported, "The excitement of the Maoris becomes uncontrollable. They gesticulate, they dance, they throw their weapons wildly in the air, while they yell like fiends let loose. But all this fierce yelling is of the most friendly character. They are bidding the Duke welcome."

=== Modern haka ===
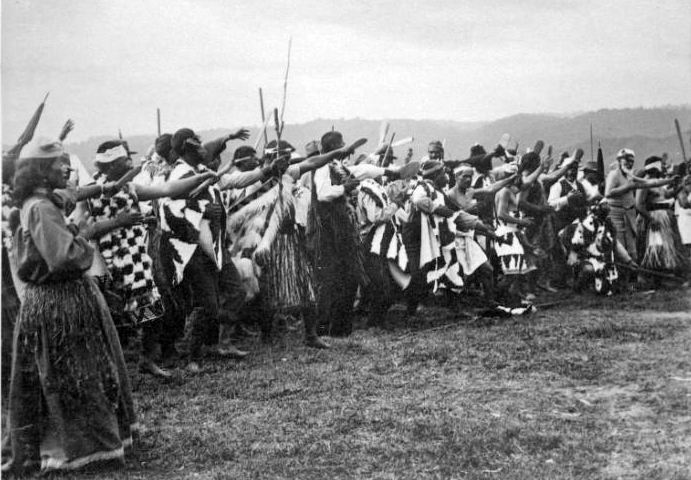
A group of men and women perform a haka for Governor Lord Ranfurly at Ruatoki, Bay of Plenty, 1904

In modern times, various haka have been composed to be performed by women and even children. In some haka the men start the performance and women join in later. Haka are performed for various reasons: for welcoming distinguished guests, or to acknowledge great achievements, occasions or funerals.

The 1884 New Zealand rugby team in Sydney began a tradition by performing haka during an international tour. The common use of haka by the national rugby union and rugby league teams before matches, has made the haka familiar internationally.

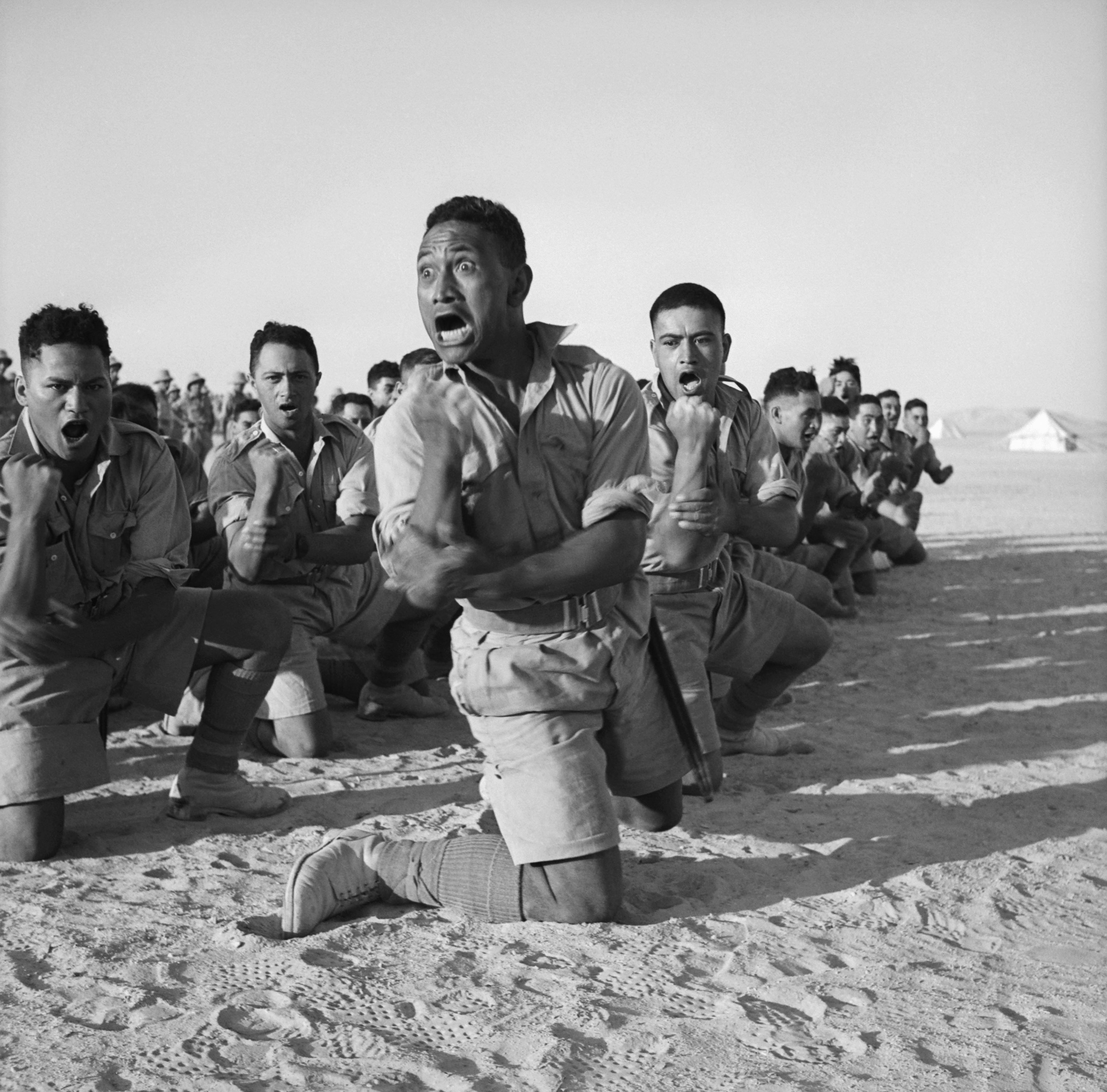
Māori Battalion haka in Egypt, 1941

Some events have caused protests. The 1979 annual "haka party" parade at the University of Auckland – in which engineering students persisted in parodying haka by painting male genitals on their body and performing with sexually obscene gestures – was disrupted by a collection of Māori and Pacific Island students (He Taua, or The War Party) headed by Ngā Tamatoa, a prominent Māori activist group. For two decades people including Māori students at the university had asked the university and the engineering department to stop the tradition. In 1979, the protesters included Hone Harawira, later a Member of Parliament. Several of the engineering students were assaulted, and members of He Taua were arrested. Their court case in Auckland sparked anti-racism protests outside the courthouse and was supported by a range of people including the president of the Auckland University Students Association.

The choreographed dance and chant popularized around the world by the All Blacks derives from "Ka Mate", a brief haka previously intended for extemporaneous, non-synchronized performance, the composition of which is attributed to Te Rauparaha (1760s–1849), a war leader of the Ngāti Toa tribe. The "Ka Mate" haka is classified as a haka taparahi – a ceremonial haka performed without weapons. "Ka Mate" is about the cunning ruse Te Rauparaha used to outwit his enemies, and may be interpreted as "a celebration of the triumph of life over death". Concerns were expressed that the authorship and significance of this haka to the Ngāti Toa were being lost and that it had "become the most performed, the most maligned, the most abused of all haka", and was now "the most globally recognised form of cultural appropriation". Specific legal challenges regarding the rights of the Ngāti Toa to be acknowledged as the authors and owners of "Ka Mate" were eventually settled in a Deed of Settlement between Ngāti Toa and the New Zealand Government and New Zealand Rugby Union agreed in 2009 and signed in 2012.

==== Spread to other Austronesian nation-states ====
The Malay College Kuala Kangsar, a historically all-boys all-Malay prestige boarding school in Malaysia adopted the haka for their own rugby team in admiration of the New Zealand All-Blacks' popularity in the 1970s under the tutelarship of Neil Jonathan Ryan. In return, said college's cheer team developed their own cry in a similar spirit, known as the bungwak. Neighbouring Singapore's Rugby Union in 2004 took on an attempt of collaborating with students all over the island to create a "Singapore Roar" inspired by the haka, even though the majority of its demographic is Chinese.

In Indonesia, a culture of doing the 'haka-haka', or its more commonly known variation, 'yel-yel', exists. The dance is performed by groups such as military personnel, law enforcement, civil servants, students, and others.

== Cultural influence ==
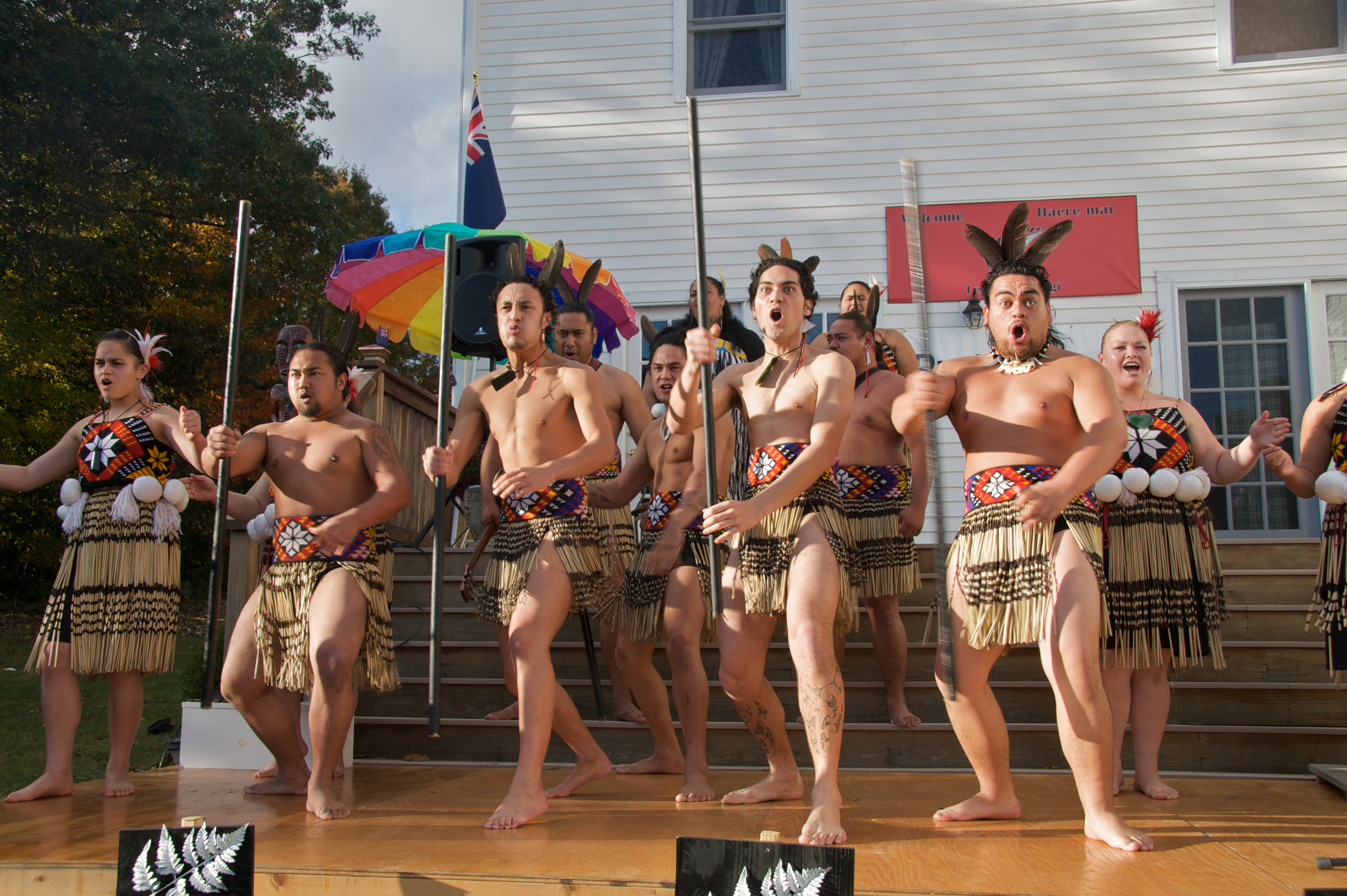
A performance by the Kahurangi Māori Dance group at the Simon Leeming Hangi in Canterbury, New Hampshire, United States, 2009

In the 21st century, kapa haka has been offered as a subject in universities, including the study of haka, and is practiced in schools and military institutions.

In addition to the national Te Matatini ("many faces") festival, local and regional competitions attract dozens of teams and thousands of spectators.

The All Blacks' use of haka has become the most widely known, but several other New Zealand sports teams now perform haka before commencing a game. These include the national rugby league team ("the Kiwis"), and the men's national basketball team ("Tall Blacks"). In the lead up to the Rugby World Cup in 2011, flashmob haka became a popular way of expressing support for the All Blacks. Some Māori leaders thought it was "inappropriate" and a "bastardisation" of haka. Sizeable flashmob haka were performed in Wellington and Auckland, as well as London, which has a large New Zealander immigrant community.

The music video for the song "Poi E" (1983) by the Pātea Māori Club, written by Dalvanius Prime and Ngoi Pēwhairangi, used a mixture of kapa haka and hip-hop choreography. This was then mixed with moves from Michael Jackson's Thriller music video as the outro song parody for Taika Waititi's movie Boy (2010).

The training of haka plays an important role in the New Zealand film Whale Rider (2002).

In November 2012, a Māori kapa haka group from Rotorua performed a version of the "Gangnam Style" dance mixed with a traditional haka in Seoul, celebrating 50 years of diplomatic relations between South Korea and New Zealand.

On 7 December 2014, at the 2014 Roller Derby World Cup in Dallas, Texas, Team New Zealand performed a haka on roller skates to the Australian Roller Derby team before their bout in the quarter-finals. Team New Zealand performed a haka before their debut game against Team USA at the 2011 Roller Derby World Cup, on 1 December 2011; however, it was unexpected and the arena music was still playing. It has since become an expected tradition.

In 2017, actor Dwayne Johnson performed a haka with a girls' soccer team in The Fate of the Furious.

Actor Jason Momoa performed a haka with a group of performers that included New Zealand actor Temuera Morrison on the red carpet at the Aquaman premiere in Los Angeles in 2018.

In March 2019, following the Christchurch mosque shootings, school pupils and other groups performed haka to honour those killed in the attacks.

The choreography in the "Miroh" music video by South Korean boy band Stray Kids featured haka elements.

Three or four American football teams are known to perform haka as a pregame rite. This appears to have begun at Kahuku High School where both the student body and local community includes many Polynesian Hawaiians, Māori, Samoans, Tahitians, and Tongans. The University of Hawaii Rainbow Warriors football team also adopted haka as a pregame rite during the 2006 season, and the practice has spread to a number of other teams overseas; there has, however, been some criticism of the practice as inappropriate and disrespectful. Non-traditional or inaccurate haka performances have been criticised by Māori academics, such as Morgan Godfery.

In September 2024, thousands gathered in Eden Park in Auckland to break the record of the largest haka performance. France held the previous official world record since 2014.

On 14 November 2024, MP Hana-Rawhiti Maipi-Clarke led a haka inside the New Zealand Parliament to protest the Treaty Principles Bill, joined by Debbie Ngarewa-Packer, Rawiri Waititi, and other MPs. Debate was temporarily paused and the house voted to suspend Maipi-Clarke.

== See also ==
- Māori music

=== Similar dances in Polynesia ===
- Cibi of Tonga
- Kailao of Wallis & Futuna and Tonga
- Siva Tau of Samoa
- Hoko of Easter Island
- Hula of Hawaii
