= Kohara =

Polynesian goddess associated with tuna fish

In Polynesian mythology, Kohara is the goddess of tuna and is considered the "mother of all tuna fish". The word also means "to throw a flash of lightning, as a deity". In Māori mythology, lightning begat tuna. In that sense, Kohara can be considered the "ancestor of tuna".

== See also ==
- List of Māori deities
