= Tamanuiterā =

God in Māori mythology

- Sun god
- Gender: Male
- Ethnic group: Māori

Genealogy
- Spouse: Ārohirohi in some legends, Hineraumati and Hinetakurua in others
- Children: Tane-rore, Auahitūroa

In Māori mythology, Tama-nui-te-rā (Tamanuiterā) is the personification of the sun.

== Etymology ==
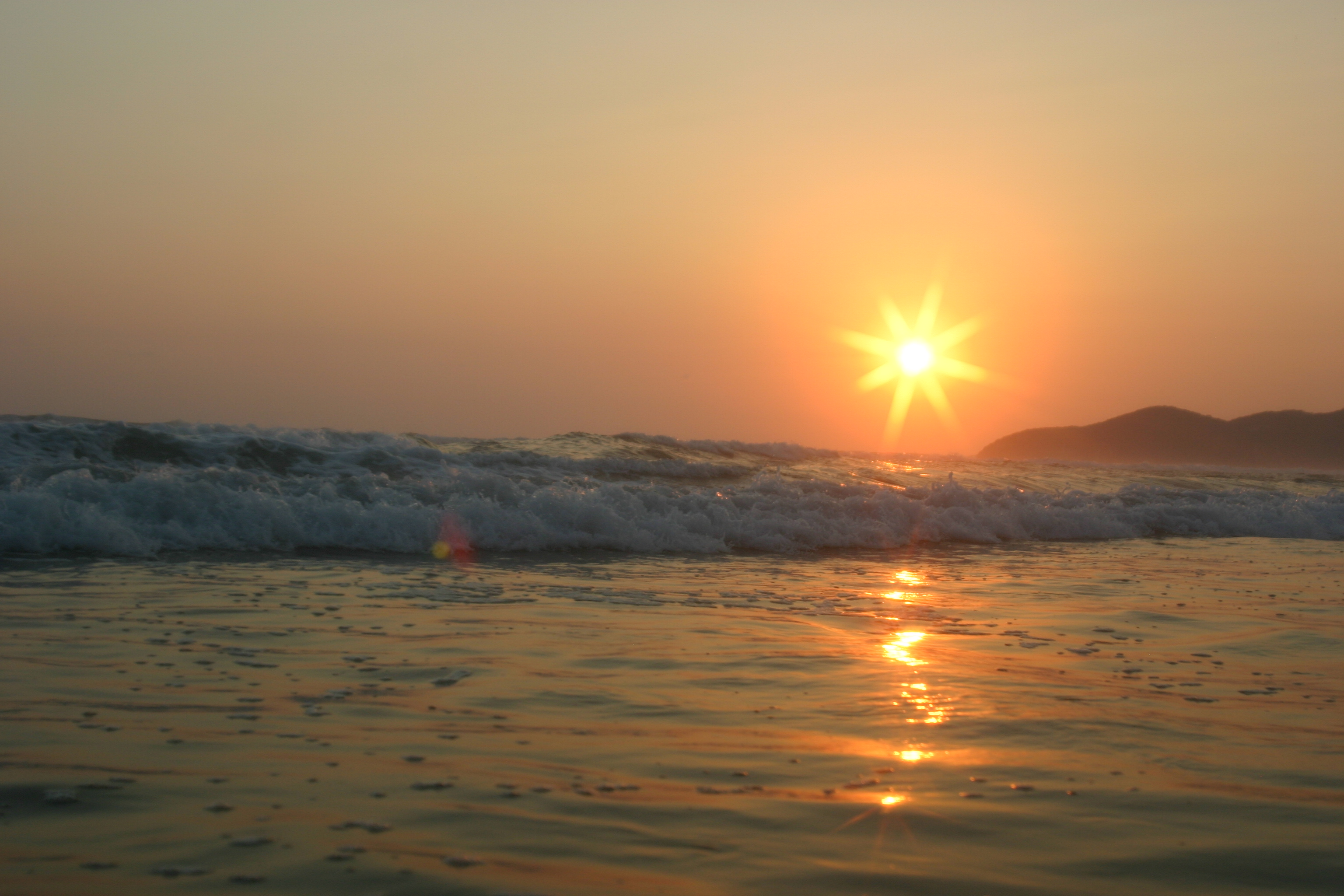
Tama-nui-te-rā is a Māori Sun god

In the Māori language, Tama-nui-te-rā means "Great Son of the Sun". The Māori word for "sun" or "day" is rā, deriving from Proto-Polynesian *laqaa.

== Legends ==
According to the Māori mythology, the sun once moved across the sky so quickly there was not enough time in the day for people to complete tasks. The demigod Māui, along with his brothers, travelled to where Tama-nui-te-rā rose from the underworld and laid ropes to catch him, then beat him to make him travel more slowly across the sky. The rays of the sun are said to be remnants of the ropes which slow the sun's journey across the sky.

== Family ==
In some legends, Tama-nui-te-rā is the husband of Ārohirohi, goddess of mirages. In other legends, Tama-nui-te-rā had two wives, the Summer maid, Hineraumati, and the Winter maid, Hinetakurua. During the year he would divide his time between his two wives; this marked the changing of the seasons and the changing position of the sun in the sky. In winter, the sun rising in the north-eastern sky marked Tama-nui-te-rā residence with Hinetakurua. After the winter solstice, the sun's changing position to the south-eastern sky was described as Tama-nui-te-rā returning to Hineraumati.

The child of Tama-nui-te-rā and Hineraumati, Tane-rore, is credited with the origin of dance.

Another son of Tama-nui-te-ra is Auahitūroa, god of comets and fires, and grandchildren of Tama-nui-te-rā are Ngā Mānawa.

== See also ==
- List of solar deities

== Bibliography ==
- J. White, The Ancient History of the Maori. Volume II. Government Printer: Wellington, 1887, 136–137, 151–152.
