= Tū-te-wehiwehi =

Māori god of reptiles

- Atua of reptiles
- Other names: Tū-te-wanawana
- Gender: Male
- Region: New Zealand
- Ethnic group: Māori

Genealogy
- Parents: Punga
- Siblings: Ikatere
- Consort: Mairangi
- Offspring: Uenuku

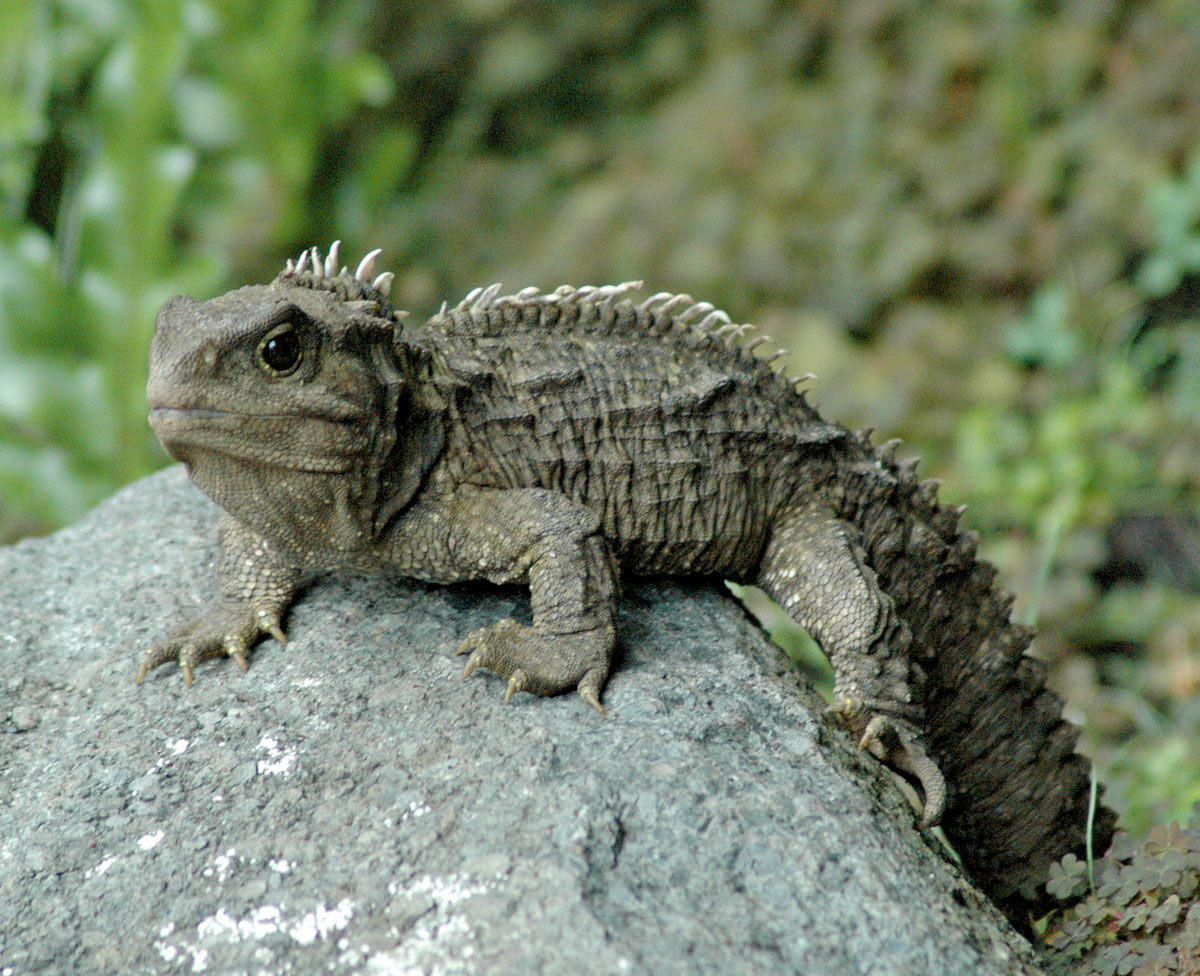
A young adult male tuatara, a native New Zealand reptile, one of the children of Tū-te-wehiwehi

Tū-te-wehiwehi (also Tū-te-wanawana) is the father of all reptiles in Māori mythology.

== Family ==
He is a son of Punga and brother of Ikatere. Punga's father was Tangaroa, atua of the sea.

When Tāwhirimātea made war against his brothers for separating Rangi and Papa, Ikatere and Tū-te-wehiwehi had to flee, and Ikatere fled to the sea and became an ancestor of fishes, while Tū-te-wehiwehi took refuge in the forest and fathered lizards. Before Tū-te-wehiwehi and Ikatere fled, they disputed together as to what they should do to escape from the storms.

One of Tu-te-wanwana's offspring was Uenuku, a lesser reptile atua. His mother was Mairangi, who was the daughter of Kauika, son of Wareware, son of Murirangawhenua and Mahuika. This Uenuku should not be confused with Uenuku, a more prominent atua.
