= Ika-Roa =

Long fish giving birth to all stars in Milky Way

In Māori mythology, Ikaroa is the long fish that gave birth to all the stars in the Milky Way or the Mother Goddess of all the stars – ornaments of the Sky God. Ika-Roa is also an alternative name for the Milky Way.

Ika-roa was also called Mangōroa ("long shark") or Mangōroa i ata ("long shark in the early dawn").
