= Odqan =

Odqan is a fire spirit in the shamanistic traditions of Mongolia. The name, meaning 'fire king', is borrowed from Turkish.

He is usually described as a red coloured humanoid, riding a brown goat. His older female counterpart is Yal-un eke, the 'fire mother'.
