= Punga (mythology) =

Supernatural being in Māori mythology

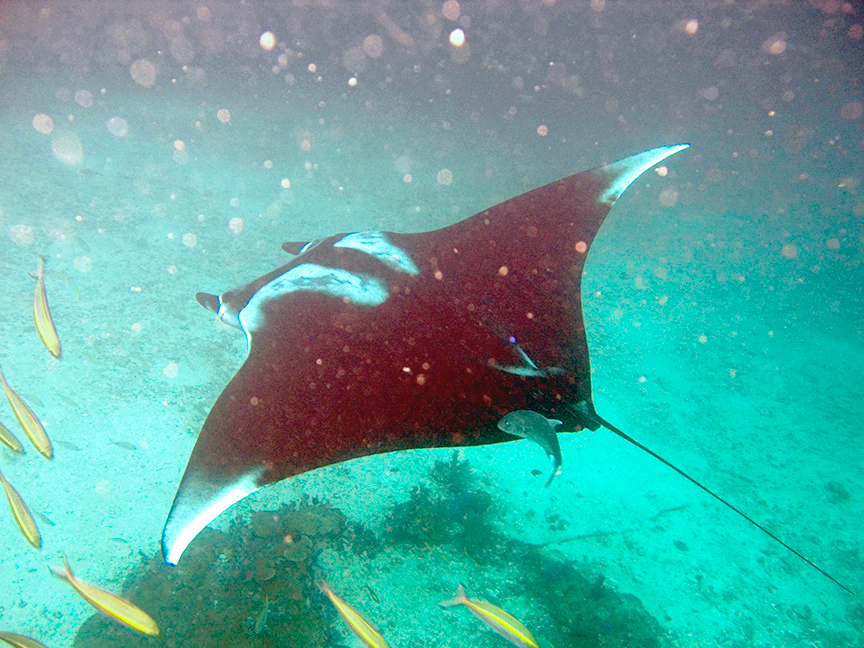
Strange animals, such as this manta ray, are Punga's children.

In Māori mythology, Punga is a supernatural being, the ancestor of sharks, lizards, rays, and all deformed, ugly things. All ugly and strange animals are Punga's children. Hence the saying Te aitanga a Punga (the offspring of Punga) used to describe an ugly person.

== Family and mythology ==
Punga is a son of Tangaroa, the god of the sea, and when Tāwhirimātea (god of storms) made war against his brothers after they separated Rangi and Papa (sky and earth), the two sons of Punga, Ikatere and Tū-te-wehiwehi, had to flee for their lives. Ikatere fled to the sea, and became the ancestor of certain fish, while Tū-te-wehiwehi took refuge in the forest, and became the ancestor of lizards.

== Etymology ==
As is appropriate for a son of Tangaroa, Punga's name has a maritime origin - in the Māori language, 'punga' means 'anchor stone' - in tropical Polynesia, related words refer to coral stone, also used as an anchor (Craig 1989:219, Tregear 1891:374).

According to some versions, Punga is the son of Rangi-potiki (father sky) and Papatūānuku (mother earth) and a twin brother to Here. In a version of the epic of Tāwhaki attributed by White to the Ngāti Hau tribe, Punga is named as a brother of Karihi and Hemā; however, in many versions, he is a cousin of the brothers Karihi and Tāwhaki (Craig 1989:219, Tregear 1891:374, White 1887:95, 125).

== Elsewhere in Polynesia ==
In some Hawaiian stories, Hema and Punga are sons of Aikanaka and Hinahanaiakamalama (Tregear 1891:374).
