= Auahitūroa =

Māori deity

Auahitūroa is a Māori god, the son of Tama-nui-te-rā, personification of comets, and the origin of fire.

His consort is Mahuika, the deity of fire. Together they have five sons, the Ngā Mānawa.

== See also ==
- Māori mythology
