= Ikatere =

Fish god in Māori and Polynesian mythology

- Gender: Male
- Region: Polynesia
- Ethnic group: Māori

Genealogy
- Parents: Punga
- Siblings: Tū-te-wehiwehi

In Māori and Polynesian mythology, Ikatere, also spelled Ika-tere, ('fast fish') is a fish god, the father of all sea creatures, including mermaids.

He is a son of Punga, and a grandson of Tangaroa, and his brother is Tū-te-wehiwehi (Grey 1971:1–5).

== Disagreements between brothers ==
When Tāwhirimātea (god of storms) made war against his brothers for the separation of Rangi and Papa (sky and earth), Ikatere and Tū-te-wehiwehi were among those who had to flee from his wrath for their survival. The two argued over whether they should stay in the sea or go to the land. Ikatere chose to keep his children, the fish, to the sea, while Tū-te-wehiwehi chose to take his children, reptiles, to the land. A saying that refers to the choices they made for their descendants goes as such:

Māori	Translation
Tāua ki uta, tāua ki te wai.	We of the land, we of the sea.

== Bibliography ==
Grey 1971:1–5
