= Tane-rore =

In Māori mythology, Tane-Rore is the personification of shimmering air as it performs a haka for his mother Hine-raumati.

== Family ==
Tama-nui-te-ra had two wives, Hine-takurua and Hine-raumati. The child of Tama-nui-te-ra and Hine-raumati, Tane-rore is credited with the origin of dance.

The wiri trembling hand action performed during the haka dance is a physical representation of the shimmering heat referred to in many different hakas around the motu but the main haka would refer to "Te haka a Tane Rore".

It is Māori belief that on occasions when the land is so hot that the air shimmers, you can see Tane-rore perform a haka for his mother. The wiriwiri or shimmering air is reminiscent of his trembling hand actions.
