= Mahuika =

Māori fire deity

- Deity of fire
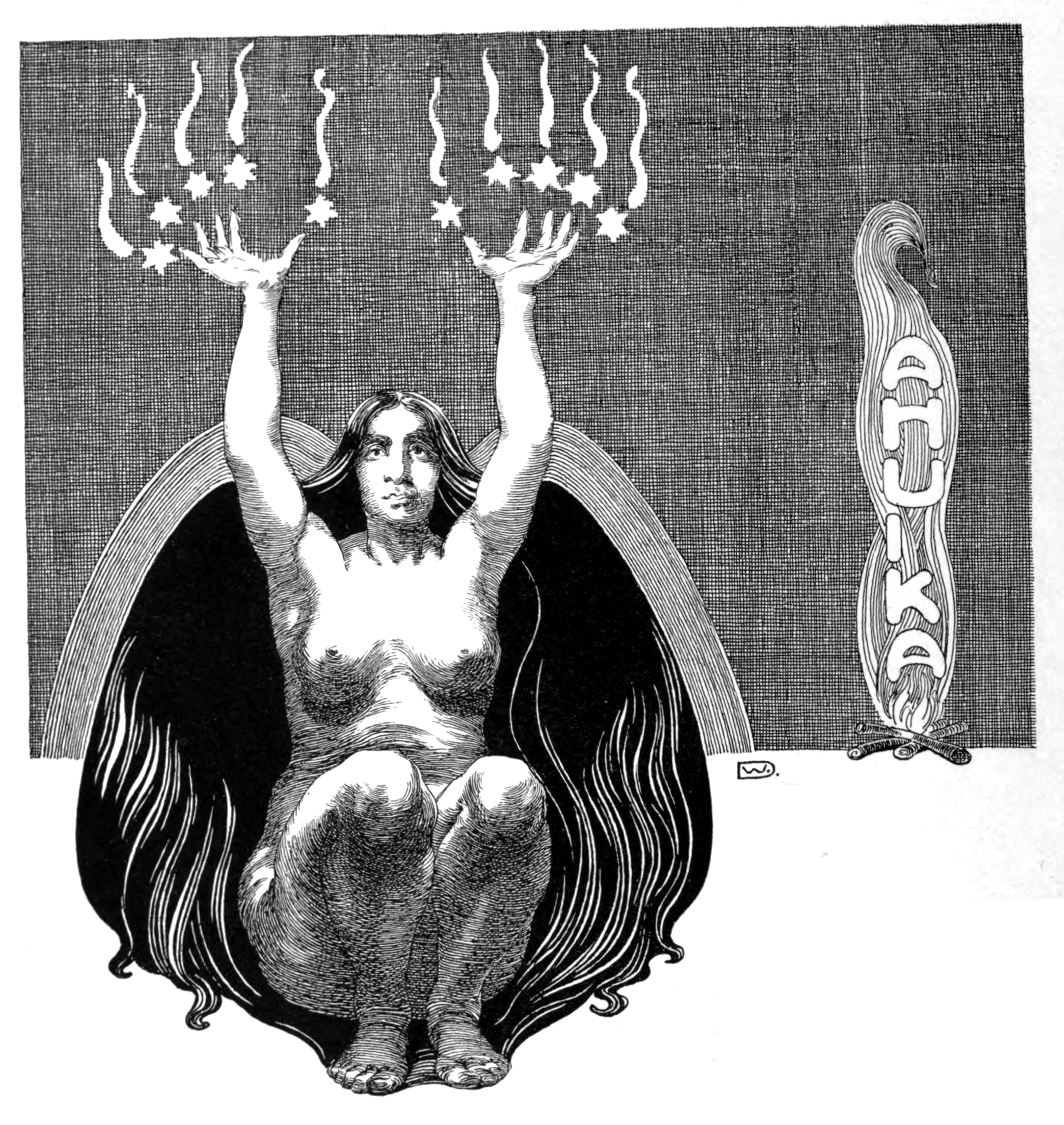
- Gender: varies by region
- Region: New Zealand
- Ethnic group: Māori

Genealogy
- Siblings: Hine-nui-te-pō (In some versions)
- Consort: Auahitūroa
- Offspring: Ngā Mānawa, Māui (In some version)

Equivalents
- Samoan: Mafuiʻe
- other parts of Polynesia: Mafuike, Mahui'e or Mahuike.

Mahuika is a Māori fire deity and consort of the god Auahitūroa.

== Myths ==
In some versions, she is the younger sister of Hine-nui-te-pō, goddess of death. It was from her that Māui (in some versions he is her grandson) obtained the secret of making fire.

She married Auahitūroa and together they had five children, named for the five fingers on the human hand, called collectively Ngā Mānawa. The symbolism of this connection between toropuku (fingers) and fire is revealed in the stories where Māui obtains fire from Mahuika by tricking her into giving him her fingernails one by one.

Māui stole fire from fingernails of Mahuika

She is also said to have played a role in the formation of Rangitoto Island, asking Rūaumoko, god of earthquakes and eruptions, to destroy a couple that had cursed her.

In some parts of New Zealand, Mahuika is a male deity. This is also the case in some parts of tropical Polynesia; for instance, in the Tuamotu archipelago and the Marquesas, Mahu-ika is the fire god who lives in the underworld in addition to being the grandfather of Maui. Maui wrestled him in order to win the secret of making fire.

In other parts of Polynesia, similar deities are known as Mafuiʻe, Mafuike, Mahui'e or Mahuike.

== Modern appearances ==
- Mahuika crater was a hypothesized impact crater named after her.
- She was depicted on coins issued in New Zealand in 2019.
- A notable figure in the video game Genshin Impact, the Pyro Archon Mavuika, hailing from the fictional country of Natlan, was named after/inspired by her.

== See also ==
- How Māui Found the Secret of Fire
