= Ngā Mānawa =

Ngā Mānawa, in a tradition of the Ngāti Awa, a Māori tribe of the eastern Bay of Plenty Region in New Zealand's North Island, was the collective name for the Fire Children, the five sons of Mahuika and Auahitūroa. The names of the Fire Children are the names of the five fingers of the human hand:

1. Takonui (thumb)
2. Takoroa (forefinger)
3. Māpere (middle finger)
4. Mānawa (ring finger)
5. Tōiti (little finger)

The names of the fire children differ in the various regions of New Zealand, simply because the name of the fingers differ. For example, to the Ngāti Kahungunu people of the East Coast of the North Island, they are:

1. Konui (thumb)
2. Koroa (forefinger)
3. Māpere (middle finger)
4. Mānawa (ring finger)
5. Kōiti (little finger)
