= Cheering =

Sounds made usually to encourage

Russian troops cheering Ura! (Russian: Ура!) at the 2010 Moscow Victory Day Parade on Moscow's Red Square.

Cheering is the uttering or making of sounds and may be used to encourage, excite to action, indicate approval or welcome.

The word cheer originally meant face, countenance, or expression, and came through Old French into Middle English in the 13th century from Low Latin cara, head; this is generally referred to the Greek καρα;. Cara is used by the 6th-century poet Flavius Cresconius Corippus, Postquam venere verendam Caesilris ante caram (In Laud em Justini Minoris). Cheer was at first qualified with epithets, both of joy and gladness and of sorrow; compare She thanked Dyomede for ale ... his gode chere (Chaucer, Troylus) with If they sing ... tis with so dull a cheere (Shakespeare, Sonnets, xcvii.). An early transference in meaning was to hospitality or entertainment, and hence to food and drink, good cheer. The sense of a shout of encouragement or applause is a late use. Defoe (Captain Singleton) speaks of it as a sailor's word, and the meaning does not appear in Johnson's Dictionary.

Of the different words or rather sounds that are used in cheering, "hurrah", though now generally looked on as the typical British form of cheer, is found in various forms in German, Scandinavian, Russian (ura), French (hourra). It is probably onomatopoeic in origin. The English hurrah was preceded by huzza, stated to be a sailors word, and generally connected with heeze, to hoist, probably being one of the cries that sailors use when hauling or hoisting. The German hoch, seen in full in Hoch lebe der Kaiser, &c., the French vive, Italian and Spanish viva, evviva, are cries rather of acclamation than encouragement. The Japanese shout banzai became familiar during the Russo-Japanese War. In reports of parliamentary and other debates the insertion of cheers at any point in a speech indicates that approval was shown by members of the House by emphatic utterances of hear hear. Cheering may be tumultuous, or it may be conducted rhythmically by prearrangement, as in the case of the Hip-hip-hip by way of introduction to a simultaneous hurrah. The saying "hip hip hurrah" dates to the early 1800s. Nevertheless, some sources speculate possible roots going back to the crusaders, then meaning "Jerusalem is lost to the infidel, and we are on our way to paradise". The abbreviation HEP would then stand for Hierosolyma est perdita, "Jerusalem is lost" in Latin.

== Chants in North American sports ==
Rhythmical cheering has been developed to its greatest extent in America in the college yells, which may be regarded as a development of the primitive war-cry; this custom has no real analogue at English schools and universities, but the New Zealand rugby team in 1907 familiarized English crowds at their matches with the haka, a similar sort of war-cry adopted from the Māoris. In American schools and colleges there is usually one cheer for the institution as a whole and others for the different classes.

The oldest and simplest are those of the New England colleges. The original yells of Harvard and Yale are identical in form, being composed of rah (abbreviation of hurrah) nine times repeated, shouted in unison with the name of the university at the end. The Yale cheer is given faster than that of Harvard. Many institutions have several different yells, a favorite variation being the name of the college shouted nine times in a slow and prolonged manner. The best known of these variants is the Yale cheer, partly taken from The Frogs of Aristophanes, which runs thus:

Brekekekex, ko-ax, ko-ax, Brekekekex, ko-ax, ko-ax, O-op, O-op, parabalou, Yale, Yale, Yale, Rah, rah, rah, rah, rah, rah, rah, rah, rah, Yale! Yale! Yale!

The first-known cheer from the sidelines was Princeton University's "rocket call", which was heard during the first-ever intercollegiate football game, between Princeton and Rutgers University in 1869.

By the 1890s, Princeton's original "rocket" had been modified into its distinctive "locomotive" cheer:

Hip, hip!
Rah, rah, rah!
Tiger, tiger, tiger!
Siss, siss, siss!
Boom, boom, boom! Ah!
Princeton! Princeton! Princeton!

It is called the "Locomotive" cheer because it sounds like a train engine that starts slowly then picks up speed. Princeton University also established the first pep club. All-male "yell leaders" supported the Princeton football team with cheers from the sidelines. (cited:: Valliant, Doris, pg 15)

The railroad cheer is like the foregoing, but begun very slowly and broadly, and gradually accelerated to the end, which is enunciated as fast as possible. Many cheers are formed like that of the University of Toronto:

Varsity, varsity,
V-a-r-s-i-t-y (spelled)
VARSIT-Y (spelled staccato)
Var-si-ty,
Rah, rah, rah!

Additionally, a non-traditional cheer has been demonstrated by The New School. In the style of American actress and singer-songwriter Christina Milian, modeled after one of her more popular singles, "Dip It Low", the students' chant dips low and is picked up slow, towards the end.

Take him by the hair
Let him know what's on
If you understand me
Y'all come on
Yeah, yeah, yeah

Another variety of yell is illustrated by that of the School of Practical Science (since 1906, the Faculty of Applied Science and Engineering) of University of Toronto:

Who are we? Can't you guess?
We are from the S.P.S.!

The cheer of the United States Naval Academy is an imitation of a nautical siren.

The Royal Military College of Canada cheer is:

Call: Gimme a beer!
Response: Beer! Esses! Emma! T-D-V! Who can stop old RMC! Shrapnel, Cordite, NCT! R-M-C Hooah!

The Amherst cheer is:

Amherst! Amherst! Amherst! Rah! Rah!
Amherst! Rah! Rah!
Rah! Rah! Rah! Rah! Rah! Rah! Amherst!

The Bryn Mawr cheer (in a form of Greek) can only be started by seniors:

Anassa kata, kalo kale
Ia ia ia Nike
Bryn Mawr, Bryn Mawr, Bryn Mawr!

(I.e. ‘Ἄνασσα κατά, καλῶ καλή. Ἰαὶ ἰαὶ ἰαί, Νίκη’, "Queen, descend, I invoke you, fair one. Hail, hail, hail, Victory.)

Besides the cheers of individual institutions there are some common to all, generally used to compliment some successful athlete or popular professor. One of the oldest examples of these personal cheers is:

Who was George Washington? First in war, First in peace, First in the hearts of his countrymen.

...followed by a stamping on the floor in the same rhythm.

College yells, more informally known as cheers and chants, are used particularly at athletic contests. In any large college there are several leaders, chosen by the students, who stand in front and call for the different songs and cheers, directing with their arms in the fashion of an orchestral conductor. This cheering and singing form one of the distinctive features of inter-collegiate and scholastic athletic contests in America.

Organised chants in North American sports are rarer then in their European counterparts, but some teams have their special routines. Common chants include "Let's go – [team name] -, let's go (clap-clap clap-clap-clap); or in case of a single syllable nickname, "Go – [team name] – Go". Spectators also use derivatives of these to chant the names of particular athletes. A notable example of this is the Derek Jeter chant, where fans chant the name of the then New York Yankees shortstop and employ a similar clapping rhythm. In some contexts, spectator chanting may also be used derisively to chide athletes or contestants.

Most teams have a scoring song played on the PA system, and some professional American football teams sing a fight song after scores. The use of fight songs after a score is universal in college football. Since scoring in basketball is more frequent, and does not generally cause breaks in the game action, scoring songs are not employed in that sport. However, in college basketball, fight songs are universally played during prolonged breaks in game action (timeouts, halftime, and overtime breaks if any). Baseball fans traditionally sing "Take Me Out to the Ball Game" in the middle of the 7th inning. After 9/11, many professional teams chose to use "God Bless America" during that break, either supplementing or replacing "Take Me Out to the Ball Game". A very loud cheer at sporting events is usually called "Do Yay".

In High School Basketball games, if the score was a blow-out and approaching the end of regulation, fans of the winning team would chant "This Game's Over" or "This One's Over." If the losing team makes a play, and that team's fans chant for that, fans of the winning team will start chanting "Scoreboard", indicating that even after the one play, the other team is losing.

=== Sis boom bah ===
The term sis boom bah is a term popular in U.S. high school and college cheers. It was used by Johnny Carson's character Carnac the Magnificent:

(Carnac holds the sealed envelope up to his turban)
CARNAC: Sis boom bah.
ED McMAHON: Sis boom bah.
(Carnac rips the envelope open and removes the card)
CARNAC (reading): Describe the sound made when a sheep explodes.

It has also been used by Bugs Bunny in the iconic cartoon, "Super-Rabbit"

Bugs: Bricka bracka firecracka sis boom bah! Bugs Bunny! Bugs Bunny! RAH RAH RAH!
Bugs, Smith and his horse: Bricka bracka firecracka sis boom bah! Bugs Bunny! Bugs Bunny! RAH RAH RAH!
Smith and his horse: Bricka bracka firecracka sis boom bah! Bugs Bunny! Bugs Bunny! RAH RAH RAH! (×2)

Pogo had a recurring character named Miss Sis Boombah, an athletic Rhode Island Red.

== Rugby union ==
Chants are less extensive in rugby union but the Oggy Oggy Oggy chant first became popular on the terraces at Welsh rugby union matches, Australians later modified the tune and created their own chant (Aussie Aussie Aussie! Oi Oi Oi!). England supporters sing "Swing Low, Sweet Chariot", a song long popular in rugby union clubs since the words lend themselves readily to a sequence of lewd hand gestures, which the Australians have been singing as well in the last decade. The Welsh sing "Cwm Rhondda", which is the tune of the hymn "Guide Me O Thou Great Redeemer", as well as the chorus of Max Boyce's "Hymns and Arias". The Fields of Athenry is often sung at matches by supporters of the Irish rugby union team. The New Zealand team (the All Blacks) are known for engaging in a ritual Māori haka before international matches. The Fiji team performs the cibi; the Samoa team the siva tau; and the Tonga team the sipa tau. The Pacific Islanders rugby union team, a joint Fiji/Samoa/Tonga representative team that played for the first time in 2004, uses a specially composed chant combining elements of each nation's traditional chant.

The Australian Rugby Union has made a concerted effort to promote the singing of Waltzing Matilda since 1999, frequently featuring singer John Williamson at home matches to lead the crowd. As singing is not a part of Australian sporting culture, this "tradition" may well fade without active support from administration.

== Cricket ==
Chants are also used in Cricket, the Barmy Army has a collection of songs and chants such as 'You all live in a convict colony' sung to the tune of 'Yellow Submarine'. It is done to remind Australian cricket fans of their supposed criminal past. The hymn Jerusalem became the song of choice for the England cricket team during the 2005 Ashes series, and Michael Vaughan encouraged the whole country to sing the song before the last Test match at The Oval.

== Around the world ==
Equivalents of English "Hurray" found around the world include, "Hourra!" in France, ¡Viva! in Spanish, "Yatta!" in Japan, and so on.

== See also ==
- Applause
- Blowing a raspberry (Bronx cheer)
- Cheerleading
- Grand Howl (Scouts cheer)
- Hooah
- Toast (honor)
- War cry
