= Hoko (dance) =

Tribal dance of Easter Island

Hoko is a term used to refer to the tribal war dance of Easter Island. However, it is also performed as a welcome dance and a gesture of hospitality, and it is performed before sports matches in the same way that the haka is performed by the New Zealand national rugby union team, similar to those in Samoa, Tonga and Fiji.

== Hoko in sport ==
Presently, the Hoko is used before football and rugby union games by CF Rapa Nui of Easter Island.
