= War dance =

Dance involving mock combat

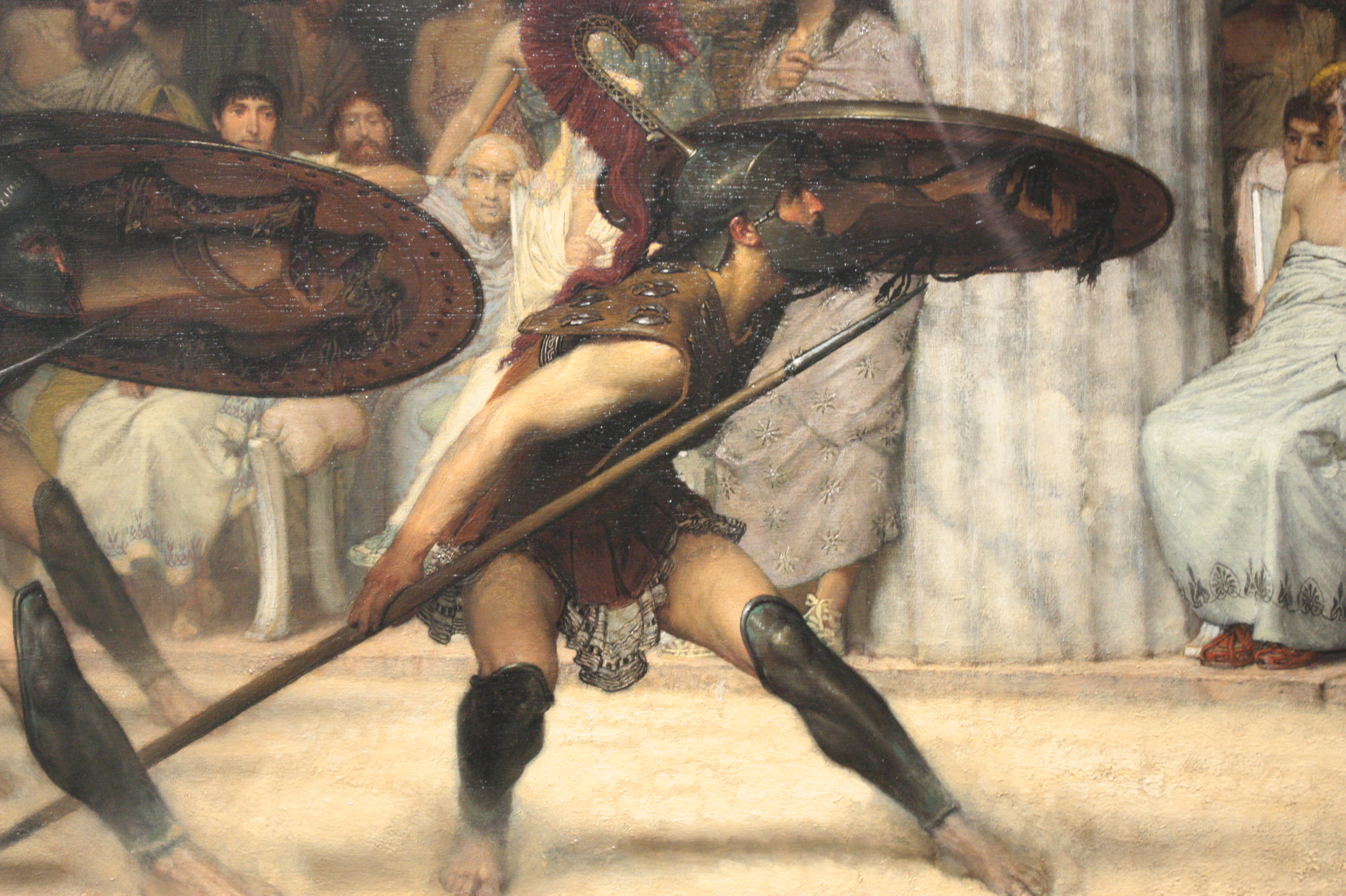
Pyrrhic war dance

A war dance is a dance involving mock combat, usually in reference to tribal warrior societies where such dances were performed as a ritual connected with endemic warfare. Martial arts in various cultures can be performed in dance-like settings for various reasons, such as for evoking ferocity in preparation for battle or showing off skill in a more stylized manner. It could also be for celebration of valor and conquest. Many such martial arts incorporate music, especially strong percussive rhythms.

War dances can overlap with sword dances and other forms of weapon dance, utilizing weapons or replications as part of the artistic performance.

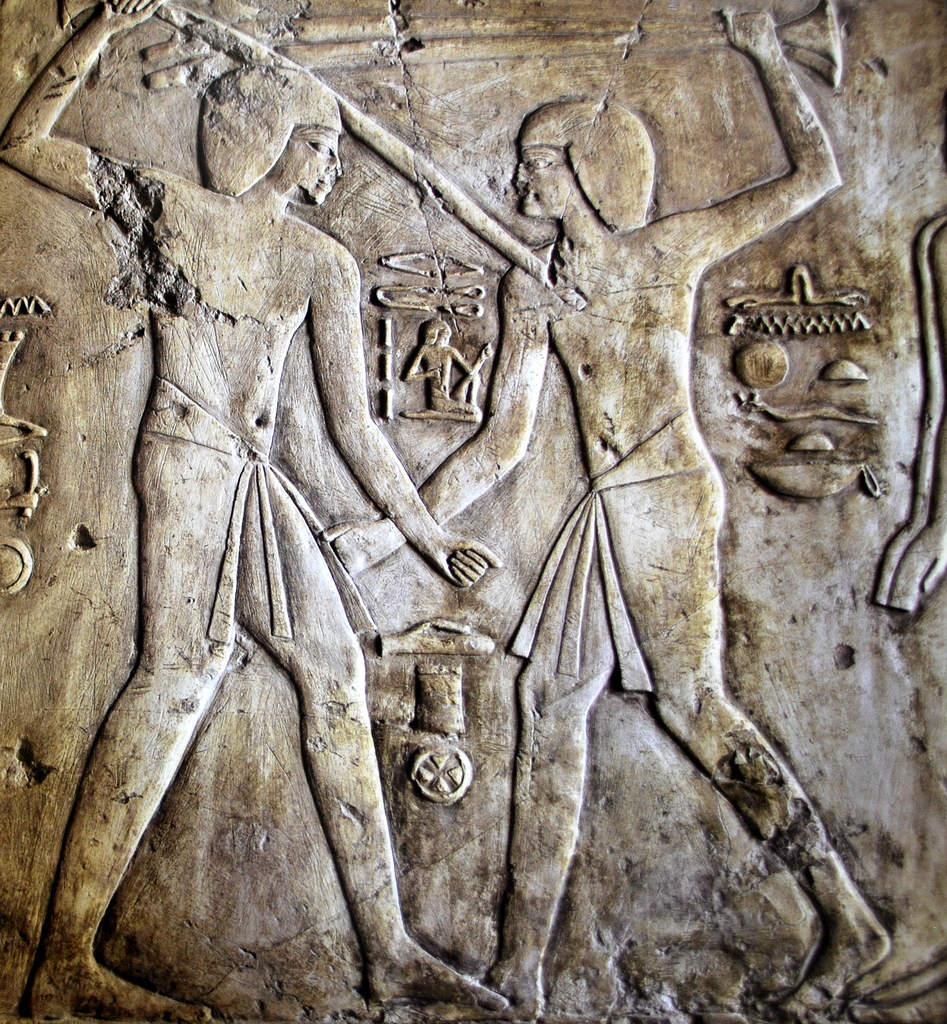
Egyptian Tahtib

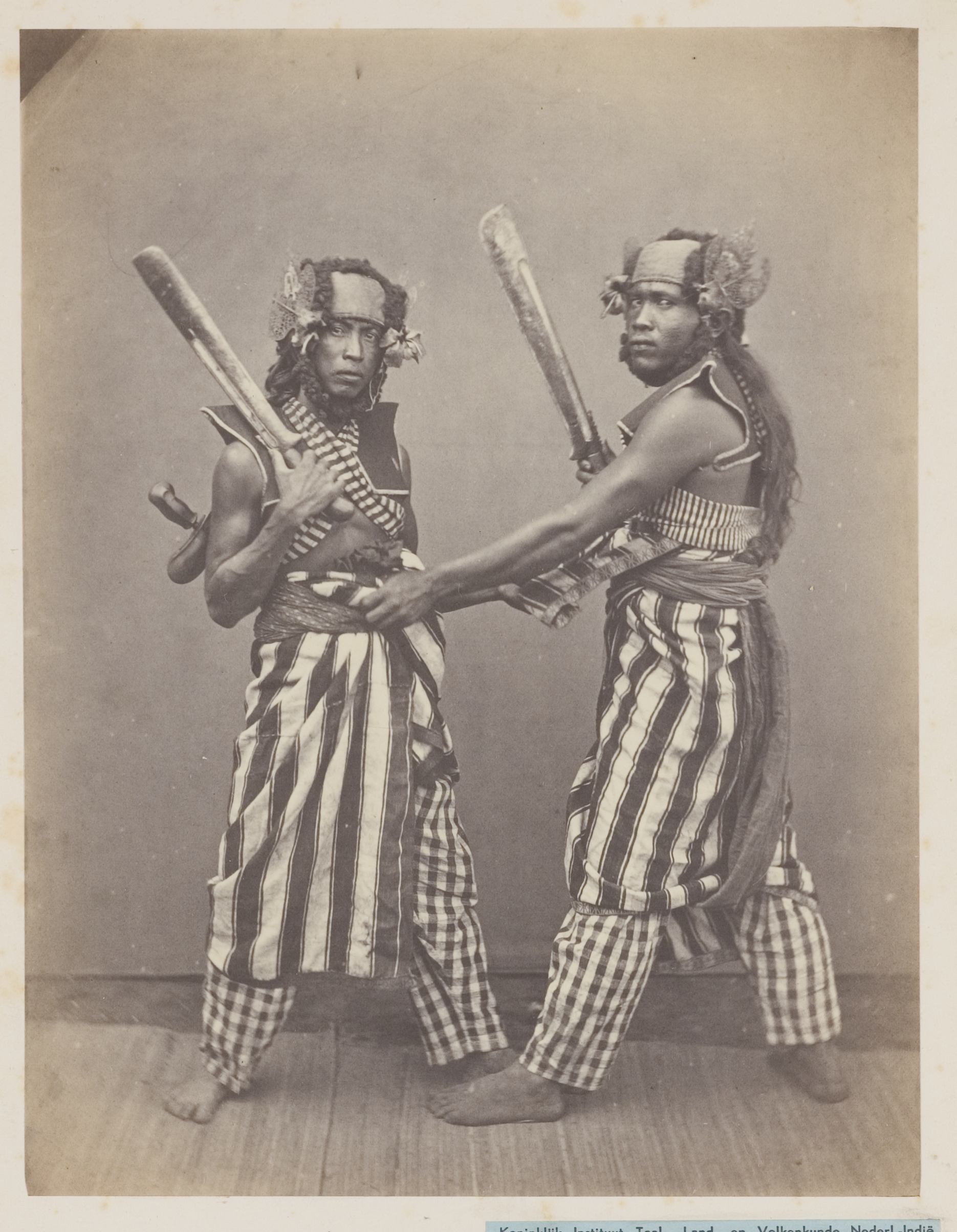
Balinese Baris dance

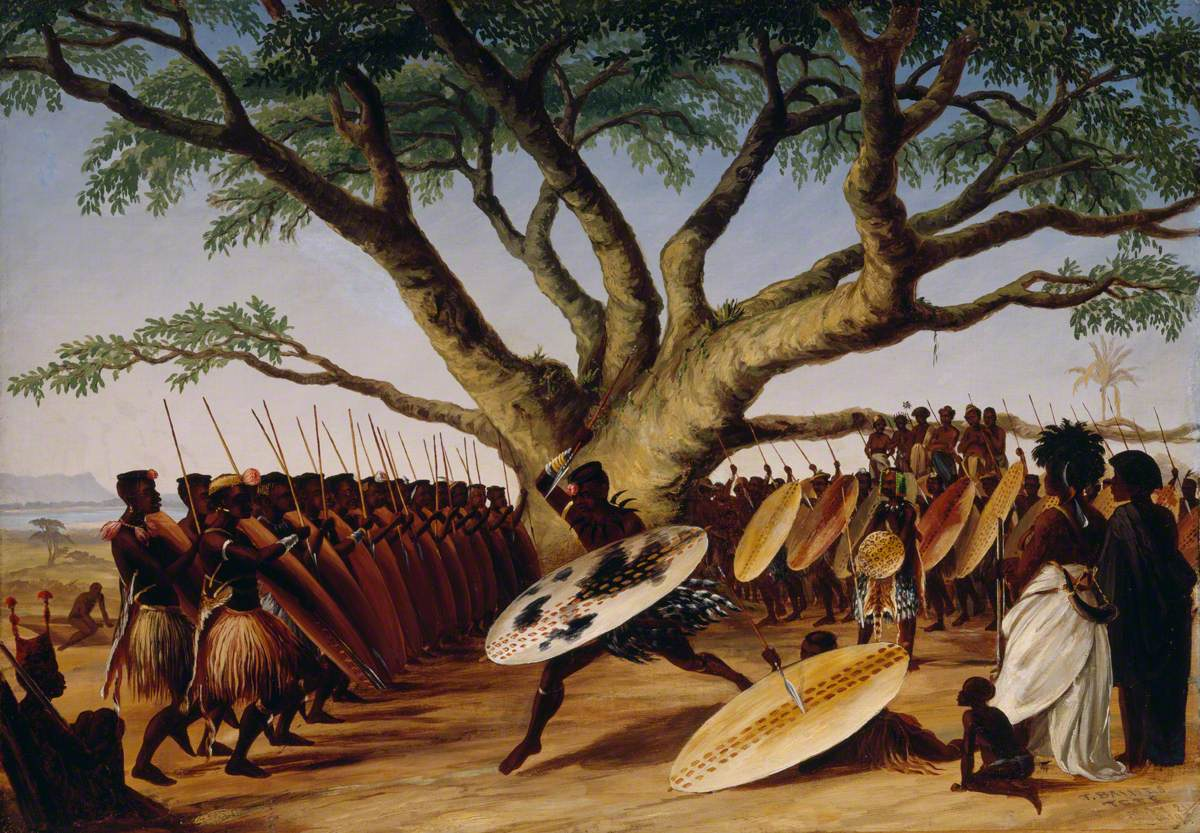
A Zulu war dance performed under a fig tree, as depicted by Thomas Baines in this 1859 oil painting.

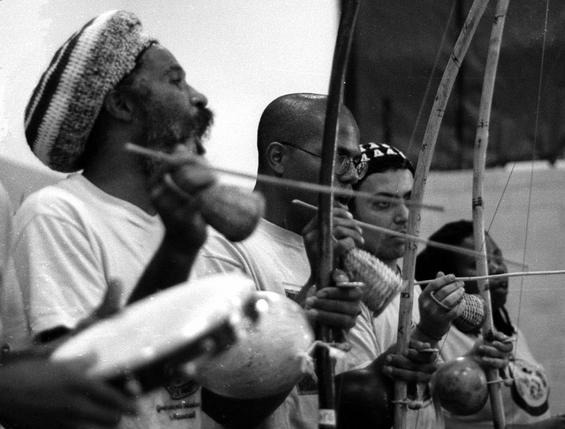
Capoeira is a martial art traditionally performed with a dance-like flavor and to live musical accompaniment, as seen depicted here.

== War dances ==
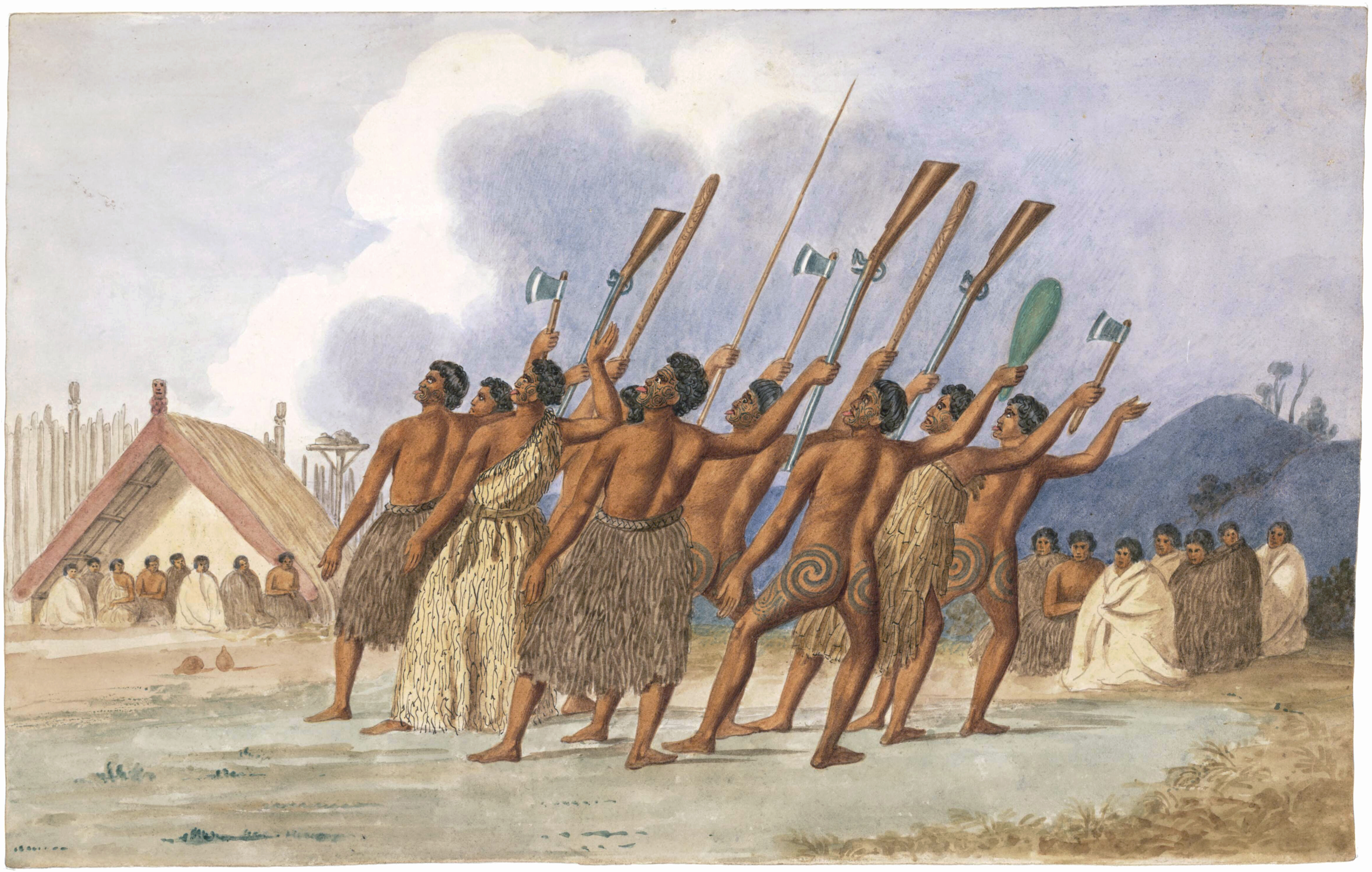
Haka performed by Māori warriors during the era of the Musket Wars and New Zealand Wars, c. 1845

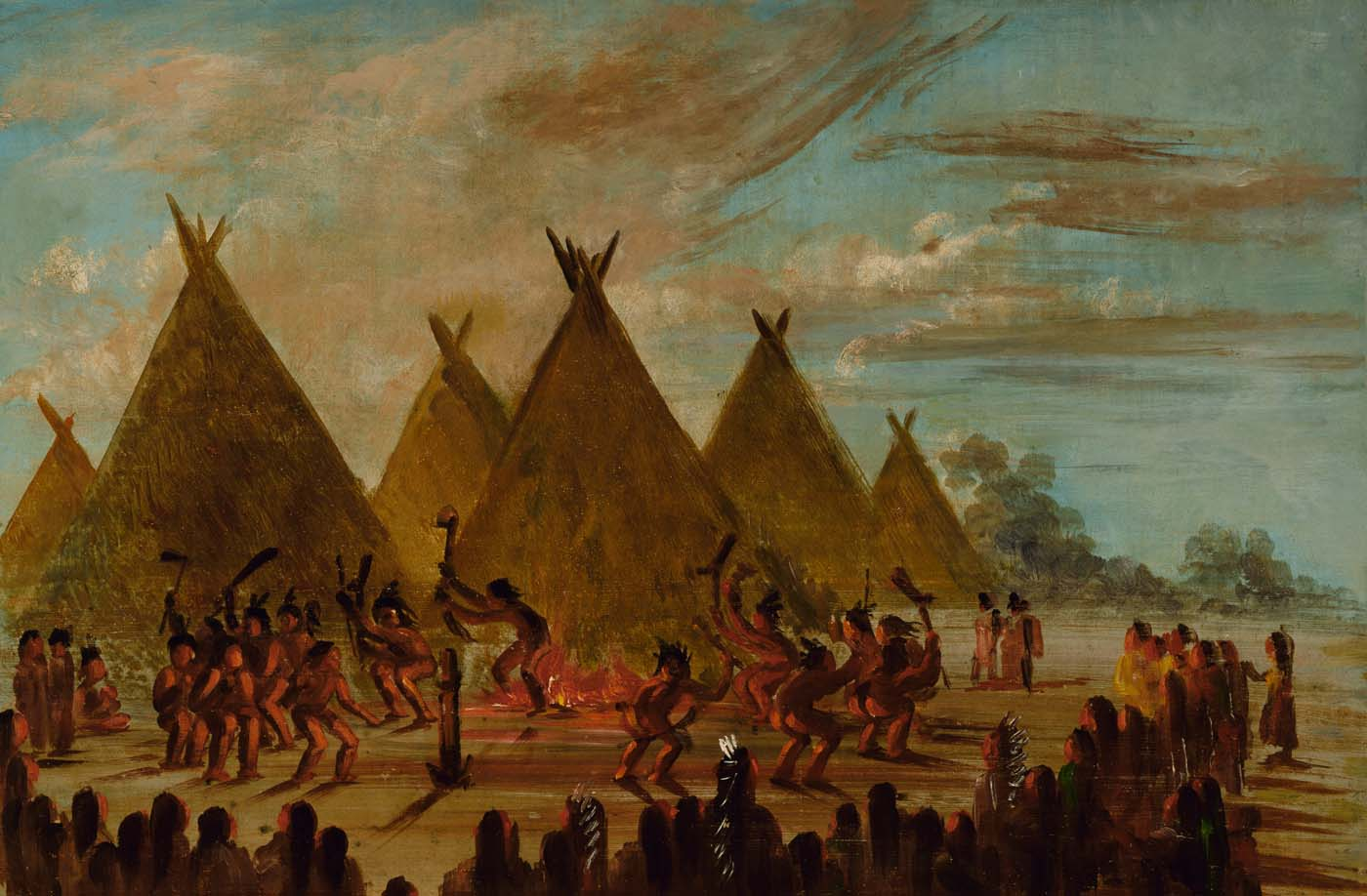
War Dance, Sioux by George Catlin, 1845–1848

Examples of war dances include:

- Aduk-Aduk – Brunei
- Albanian war dances
- Ardah – Arabian Peninsula, Kuwait
- Ayyalah – Arabian Peninsula
- Attan - Afghanistan and Pushtun Areas of Pakistan
- Baris – Bali, Indonesia
- Bende War Dance – Nigeria
- Buza – Russia
- Blood walk – Bloods of United States
- Cakalele – Maluku, Indonesia
- Capoeira, as well as some similar Afro-Caribbean arts
- Cibi – Fiji
- Crip Walk – Crips of United States
- Dirk dance and Scottish sword dances – Scotland
- Dier Dance- upper East, Bolgatanga-Ghana
- European sword dance or weapon dance of various kinds
- Haka - Māori people of New Zealand
- Hako (Rapa Nui) – Easter Island
- Hopak – Ukraine
- Odzemek - Slovakia and Moravian Wallachia
- Hula and Kapu Kuialua – Native Hawaiians
- Indlamu – Zulu people
- Juego de maní – Cuba
- Kabasaran – Minahasan people, North Sulawesi, Indonesia
- Kailao – Wallis, adopted by Tonga
- Khattak – Afghanistan and Pakistan
- Khorumi (ხორუმი) – Georgia
- Ohafia War Dance – Eastern Nigeria
- Panther Dance – Burmese Bando with swords (dha)
- Pentozali – Crete
- Pyrrhichios – Greece
- Razfah – Oman and the United Arab Emirates
- Reggada – Morocco
- Sagayan – Philippines
- Siva Tau – Samoan war dance
- Tahtib – Egypt
- Takalo - Niue
- Yarkhushta (Յարխուշտա) – Armenia
- Yowlah – Oman and the United Arab Emirates

== See also ==
- Battle cry
- Display behaviour
- Kata
- Martial music
- Military drills:
  - Exhibition drill
  - Foot drill
- Show of force
- Weasel war dance
- Military cadence
