= Plume of the Arawas =

1930 novel by Frank Acheson

"Plume of the Arawas" frontispiece, by Harry Rountree

Plume of the Arawas: An Epic of Maori Life is a 1930 novel by Frank Acheson. The novel is a fictionalised account of the early life of Ngāti Tūwharetoa founder Tūwharetoa i te Aupōuri.

== Plot ==
The novel is an adventure-romance story. Manaia of Te Arawa is the son of Māori chief Mawake-Taupō. After a war with Ngāi Tūhoe he travels south to Lake Taupō, where he falls in love with Reremoa, the daughter of a rival chief. The pair's story is back-dropped by the beginning of war between the two tribes.

== Development ==
Acheson, a citizen of New Zealand and judge on the Māori Land Court, wrote the novel based on his own understanding of the Māori people and credited several Māori friends in the preface of the book. The novel was set to be adapted into a film by Eric Mareo with a £20,000 budget (equivalent to £1,229,790 in 2025), however, Mareo's arrest in 1935 for the murder of his wife apparently halted those plans.

=== Publication history ===
Plume of the Arawas was published in New Zealand by Whitcombe & Tombs in 1930. It received an American release that same year with an edition published by the Neale Publishing Company. In 1938, the novel was republished by Reed Publishing as part of their children's line.

== Reception ==
Plume of the Arawas received generally positive reception in the popular press upon its American release. A positive review in The News & Observer praised Acheson's imagery and wrote that "the author has made a beautiful love story" and "a deeply moving story of noble proportions." A short review in The Miami News wrote positively about Acheson's treatment of Māori customs. The Chattanooga News wrote that "one cannot help but feel admiration" for the Māori after reading the novel, while The Wilkes-Barre Record positively described Acheson's transitions between war scenes and romance.

In a 1981 review of New Zealand literature in Modern Fiction Studies, Shaun Hughes described the novel as falling into a common trap in early literature about Māori people, that they spent more time on explanations and exposition than on character development or plot. Richard Boast noted in his 2008 book Buying the Land, Selling the Land that the novel is "saturated with Acheson's romanticised and highly couloured vision of pre-European Maori life."
