= Frank Acheson =

New Zealand lawyer and judge (1887–1948)

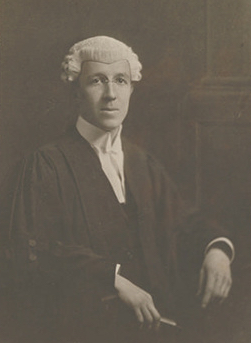
- Born: Frank Oswald Victor Acheson; 27 June 1887; Riverton, New Zealand
- Died: 25 March 1948 (aged 60); Invercargill, New Zealand
- Occupations: lawyer, judge, mayor
- Known for: Native Land Court judge

Frank Oswald Victor Acheson (27 June 1887 – 25 March 1948) was a New Zealand lawyer and judge of the Native Land Court.

== Early life ==
He was born in Riverton, Southland, New Zealand on 27 June 1887. He gained his LLB degree at the University of Otago in about 1910, and an LLM degree from Victoria University College in 1913 (both part of the University of New Zealand at the time).

== Land court ==
Acheson was interested in Māori land tenure and wrote a lengthy essay on the subject in 1913 arguing that Māori had clear customs and practices regarding land amounting to customary law. This essay was in opposition to the prevailing legal opinions at the time. He started work as a clerk at the Native Land Purchase Board in 1914, and became a native land purchase officer in 1918, working in the Hawke's Bay and Wanganui areas. The following year, he became commissioner and a land court judge in the Taranaki-Wanganui area. In 1924 he moved to be land court judge in North Auckland, where he remained until 1943.

Major cases Acheson was involved with included whether the land court could recognise Māori claims to the foreshore, and whether the Treaty of Waitangi had legal weight. Lake Tangonge, Lake Ōmāpere and Ōrākei were land disputes he played a significant role in.

In 1925 Acheson proposed the Tokerau District Maori Land Board, of which he was president, fund a dairying scheme at Te Kao. He believed this scheme would assist Northland Māori to develop their remaining lands and ameliorate the poverty of the area. Although the 1934 commission of inquiry into the Native Affairs Department administration supported his work, the 1935 Labour Government increased official supervision of the scheme. Acheson considered this government bureaucracy and his relationship with the Native Department and the Government became strained.

In 1943, Acheson was forced to retire as land court judge. Financial problems of the Tokerau Board over the dairying scheme were the given reason, but his pro-Māori stance and poor relationship with the Government undoubtedly contributed.

== Political career ==
In 1941 he was to contest Rotorua as an Independent National candidate, however the election was postponed due to World War II. Acheson then applied for official selection for the National Party for the Rotorua electorate for the 1943 general election, but narrowly missed out. In 1946 he applied for the National candidacy at Wallace but Tom Macdonald was selected instead.

He became chairman of the Southland Regional Planning Council in the mid-1940s, and mayor of Riverton in 1947. He had three strokes, the first in December 1947, and died in Invercargill on 25 March 1948.

== Personal life ==
Acheson married Flora McGregor in 1910, and they had a daughter in 1912. Flora died in 1943.

== Other activities ==
Acheson was a keen rugby player and travelled as an official supporter with the 1924-25 All Black tour of Britain, France and Canada. He "polished up" the haka which was written on the journey to Europe.

In 1922 Acheson published a modified version of his 1913 essay in the Journal of Comparative Legislation and International Law and in 1931 he published a further version in a collection of essays. He published six articles in The Mirror in 1940 on the work of Te Puea Herangi.

He wrote an adventure novel about pre-Pakeha Māori life, Plume of the Arawas, which was published in 1930 and in a second edition in 1938. He supported the 1935 film Hei Tiki by encouraging member of Ngāti Tūwharetoa to become cast members, and backed Whina Cooper and other Northland Māori leaders' project to build a waka to mark the centennial of the Treaty of Waitangi.
