= Haka in sports =

Use of a traditional Māori dance by sports teams

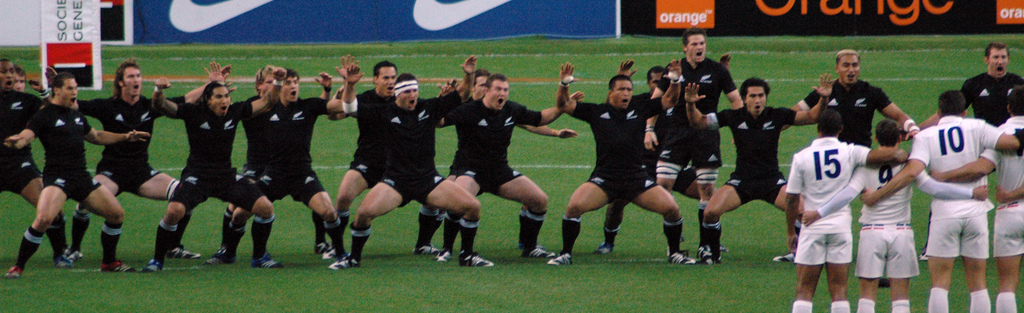
The All Blacks perform "Ka Mate" led by Richie McCaw against France in November 2006

Haka, traditional dances of the Māori people, have been used in sports in New Zealand and overseas. Haka are performed to challenge opponents before matches. The dance form has been adopted by the New Zealand national rugby union team, the "All Blacks", the Māori All Blacks, New Zealand women's national rugby union team, the "Black Ferns" and a number of other New Zealand national teams perform before their international matches; some non-New Zealand sports teams have also adopted haka.

== History ==
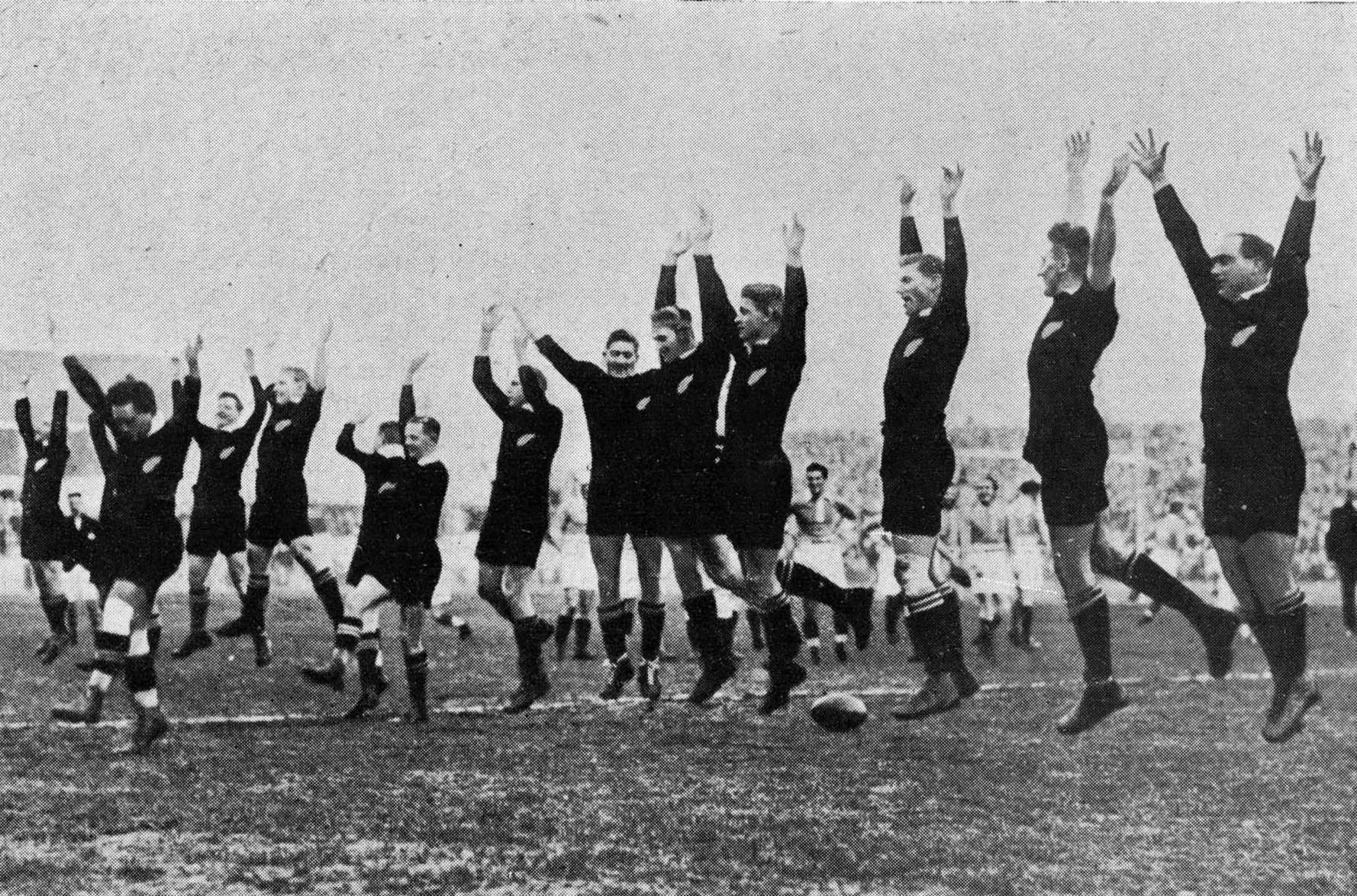
The All Blacks at the climax of their haka before a test against France in Paris, January 1925

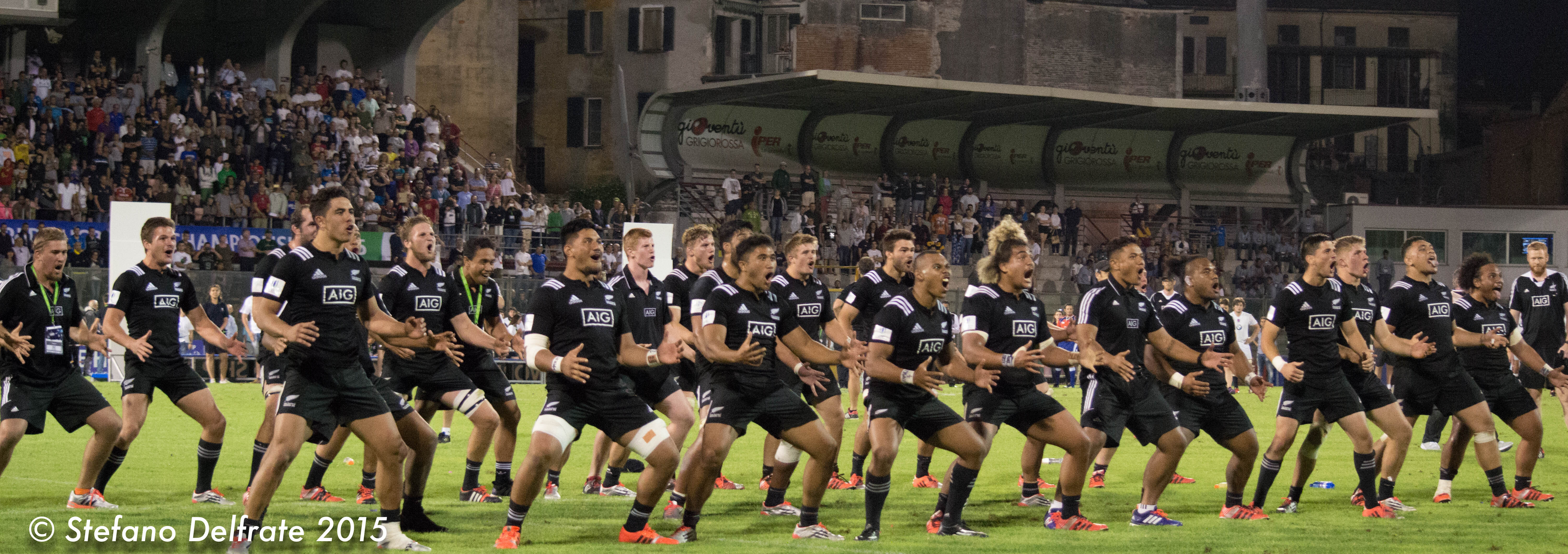
Haka performed by the Baby Blacks in the 2015 World Rugby U20 Championship Final.

The first recorded public performances of a group haka outside of New Zealand were made in 1884 by the New Zealand rugby union team during its visit to Sydney. It was described in The New Zealand Herald as "the New Zealand football cry, 'Ake, ake, ake, ake, kia kaha' (for ever, for ever keep up your courage; go on with vigour)".

During 1888–89, the New Zealand Native team toured the Home Nations of the United Kingdom, the first team from a colony to do so. It was originally intended that only Māori players would be selected, but four non-Māori were finally included. As the non-Māori were born in New Zealand, the name "Native" was considered justified. The team performed a haka before the start of their first match on 3 October 1888 against Surrey. They were described as using the words "Ake ake kia kaha" which suggests that the haka was not "Ka Mate".

The "Ka Mate" haka was not well known at this time. In 1900, a newspaper reported New Zealand soldiers in the Boer War chanting "Ka Mate! Ka Mate! Ka ora! Ka ora! Hae-haea! Ha!" The soldiers thought it meant "Kill him! Chop him up! Baste him!"

But during the 1901 Royal Tour, Ngāti Kahungunu warriors Ngāti Kahungunu revived "Ka Mate" when they performed it to welcome the Duke of Cornwall at Rotorua. Newspapers described the full actions of this "ancient ngeri", printing its complete Māori words and an accurate translation. A movie cameraman recorded the performance. "Ka Mate" became famous, and was widely performed throughout New Zealand.

Nevertheless, when New Zealand played its first full international test match against Australia in Sydney in August 1903, the New Zealanders' war cry was "Tena Koe Kangarū." (full details below)

=== All Blacks ===
In 1905 New Zealand made their first tour of Britain. This was the first time the team were referred to as the All Blacks and this particular team also became known as the 'Originals'. It is uncertain whether they performed a haka before every match, but they at least performed "Ka Mate" before their first test, against Scotland, and before the match against Wales. The Welsh crowd, led by the Welsh team, responded by singing the Welsh national anthem.

When a New Zealand Army team played Wales in 1916, the words of "Ka Mate" were included in the printed programme, indicating that the haka was established as an accompaniment to New Zealand rugby teams playing overseas.

The 1924–25 New Zealand rugby team which toured the United Kingdom, Irish Free State, France and Canada and which was nicknamed the Invincibles, performed a haka that was written for them during the voyage to England by two supporters, Judge Frank Acheson of the Native Land Court and Wiremu Rangi of Gisborne. The haka was led by star player George Nēpia. It was performed before all but two of the tour matches. Reporters criticised the team for disappointing the crowd on the two occasions it was not performed.

A pre-match haka was not always performed on All Blacks tours. The team that toured Britain in 1935–36 did not perform one before matches, although they did some impromptu performances at social functions. In the early decades, haka were only rarely performed at home matches, such as the third test of the 1921 Springboks tour, played in Wellington. The All Blacks did not perform a haka at any match on their 1949 tour of South Africa and Rhodesia as a protest against South Africa's apartheid laws banning them from bringing any Māori players.

In the All Blacks' opening 2015 Rugby World Cup game against Argentina the pyramid formation was first used and had been the regular way the players performed it until 2023.

=== Shelford reforms ===
By the 1980s the quality of the haka performances had deteriorated to what some considered to be embarrassing levels as it was performed by mainly non-Māori players who showed little understanding of the meaning and significance of the haka movements. On the 1986 All Blacks tour to Argentina Buck Shelford after consulting with hooker Hika Reid decided that it was about time that reform was needed. He later commented "I grew up watching the All Blacks do the haka and it was quite comical really the way they did it because they weren't very well trained. I don't think they ever practised it, and they were all out of sync at times and sometimes their actions weren't the same." When a member of the touring party inquired as to whether to perform the haka on the tour Shelford told the team members “If we're going to do it, we're going to do it right. Either perform the haka properly or not at all. Vote on it and decide which way you want to go.” The team was adamant they wanted to perform the haka. As a result, Reid and Shelford who had 10 years of kapa haka experience trained them on how to correctly perform the haka, stressing the importance of correctly learning the tikanga, correct pronunciation of the words and actions. To further help the team in their understanding Shelford upon his appointment as captain in 1987 brought the team to Te Aute College, a Māori school, to see the students perform a traditional haka. Up until that time the haka was traditionally only performed at overseas matches. Now that the team were capable of performing it to a high standard Shelford was instrumental in the All Blacks performing the haka for the first time in New Zealand at the 1987 Rugby World Cup. The All Blacks would go on to win their first world championship at that World Cup.

=== Māori All Blacks ===
The Māori All Blacks traditionally used the same haka as the All Blacks until Te Whetu Werohia Tipiwai who was a member of the New Zealand Māori Rugby Board for 15 years and the kaumātua of the Māori All Blacks from 2001 to 2010, composed a new haka, “Timatanga”, for the team. This was first performed in 2001.

=== Black Ferns ===
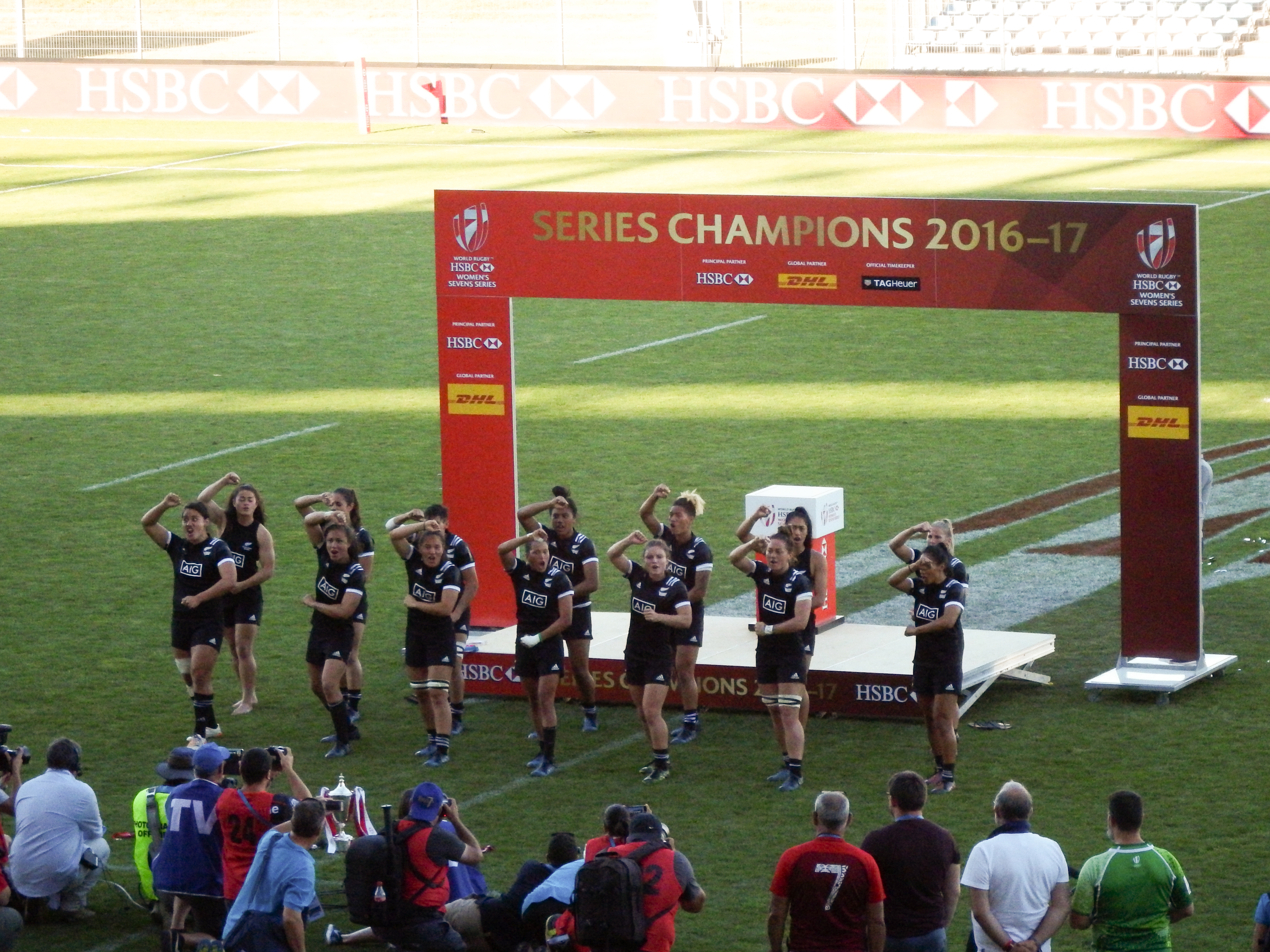
The Black Ferns Sevens team performing the haka at the end of the Clermont Sevens tournament in 2017

The first overseas appearance of the haka at a women's game was on 6 April 1991 in Glamorgan when the New Zealand women's rugby team performed “Ka Mate” before their first pool game, which was against Canada, at the first Women's Rugby World Cup in Wales in 1991. The performance of “Ka Mate” was a source of some controversy as a number of Māori elders and cultural experts were of the opinion that Debbie Chase who led the performance should not have done so using a wide-leg stance, as this was not appropriate for a woman.

The concerns about the use of “Ka mate” led captain Lenadeen Simpson-Brown (who was of Ngāti Porou descent) to obtain permission from the elders of Ngāti Porou to use verses from the iwi’s “Ka Panapana” haka. The team first performed it on the Canada Cup tour in 1996.

After seven games as captain Simpson-Brown was replaced by a captain who had no connection to Ngāti Porou, which led to concerns about continued use of a haka associated with a specific iwi, whereas the team represented all of the country. The Black Ferns however continued to perform “Ka Panapana” until 2002, by which time it was becoming apparent that it would be better to create a haka that was unique to the Black Ferns. Te Whetu Werohia Tipiwai, took up the challenge of composing one. A discussion followed with former Black Ferns captain Farah Palmer about the team's values. He then used a waiata (song) composed by Pania Papa as inspiration, though the words did not come to him until he was driving over the Tararua ranges. In August 2006 he donated his creation “Ko Ūhia Mai” to the Black Ferns, to which former Black Fern Exia Shelford and Mania Parihi created the rhythm, before in association with a group of players they created suitable actions for the haka. This haka has been used by the Black Ferns since then.

== Specific haka ==
=== "Ka Mate" ===
The All Blacks are believed to have first performed a choreographed and synchronized version of the "Ka Mate" haka in 1905.

This haka was composed by Te Rauparaha of Ngāti Toa to commemorate his escape from death during an incident in 1810. Chased by his enemies, he hid in a food-storage pit under the skirt of a woman. He climbed out to find someone standing over him, who, instead of killing Te Rauparaha, turned out to be another chief friendly to him. In relief, Te Rauparaha performed this ancient haka, which had been performed all through New Zealand for centuries. The story of Te Rauparaha was merely woven into several older stories about this haka, from a rope-hauling chant to beach a 14th-century voyaging waka, a call for unity under one strong leader, and at the end of an erotic wedding-night chant, 'Kikiki Kakaka.' Ka Mate is still used today together with 'Toia Mai' to "haul the waka" of visitors onto a marae.

==== Performance ====
The "Ka Mate" rugby haka generally opens with a set of five preparatory instructions shouted by the leader, before the whole team joins in:

"Ka Mate"
Leader:	Taringa whakarongo!	Pay attention, listen!
	Kia rite! Kia rite! Kia mau!	Get ready...! Line up...! Stand fast!
Team:	Hī!	Yes, sir!
Leader:	Ringa ringa pakia!	Slap the hands against the thighs!
	Waewae takahia kia kino nei hoki!	Stomp the feet as hard as you can!
Team:	Kia kino nei hoki!	As hard as we can!
Leader:	Ka mate, ka mate!	It is death, it is death!
Team:	Ka ora, Ka ora!	It is life, it is life!
Leader:	Ka mate, ka mate!	It is death, it is death!
Team:	Ka ora, Ka ora!	It is life, it is life!
All:	Tēnei te tangata pūhuruhuru	This is the Hairy Man...
	Nāna ne i tiki mai whakawhiti te rā	...who fetched the sun and caused it to shine again
	A upane, Ka upane!	One upward step, another upward step!
	A upane, kaupane	An upward step, another!
	Whiti te rā!	The sun shines!
	Hī!	Rise!

=== "Tena Koe Kangarū" 1903 ===
Early in July 1903, when the New Zealand players were assembling in Wellington for their Australian tour, The Evening Post reported that "A unique souvenir has been prepared for the New Zealand team by Mr C. Parata. It contains the following warcry":

Tena koe, Kangarū?	How do you do, Kangaroo?
Tupato koe, Kangarū!	You look out, Kangaroo!
Niu Tireni tenei haere nei	New Zealand is invading you
Au, Au, Aue a!	Woe, woe, woe to you!

(Some performances would use the name Aotearoa in place of Niu Tireni)

The Post's rugby correspondent later reported that the war-cry was first practised by the New Zealand team in mid-Tasman on Monday 13 July, and first performed "in response to several calls" at their official reception at Sydney on Thursday 16 July. The reported wording and translation were published next day in the Sydney Morning Herald and in the Sunday Times on 19 July 1903, after the first match against NSW.

The New Zealanders played ten matches on the tour (won 10, lost 0, points for 276, points against 13). Presumably the warcry was performed before all their matches although a search in PapersPast only located mention of its use before "the first test match".

=== "Ko Niu Tireni" 1924 ===
The Invincibles performed this haka during their unbeaten 1924–1925 tour. It was purpose-written on their voyage to Europe by Wiremu Rangi of Gisborne, and revised by Judge Acheson of New Zealand's Native Land Court. It had two verses, but the second verse (Put a few of your famous teams on display, and let's play each other in friendship) was omitted in later matches.

==== First verse of Ko Niu Tireni, with a 1925 translation ====
Kia whakangawari au i a hau	Let us prepare ourselves for the prey
I au-e! Hei!	(The sound of being ready)
Ko Niu Tireni e haruru nei!	The New Zealand storm is about to break
Au, Au, aue hā! Hei!	(The sound of the imminent storm.)
Ko Niu Tireni e haruru nei!	The New Zealand storm waxes fiercer
Au, Au, aue hā! Hei!	(Sounds of The height of the storm.)
A ha-ha!
Ka tū te ihiihi	We shall stand fearless
Ka tū te wanawana	We shall stand exalted in spirit
Ki runga ki te rangi,	We shall climb to the heavens
E tū iho nei, tū iho nei, hī!	We shall attain the zenith the utmost heights.
Au! Au! Au!

Newspaper reports of early games spoke of the "weird war cry of the visitors" in response to the crowds' singing. Thus the fifth game at Swansea began with 40,000 waiting Welshmen singing Cwm Rhondda, Sospan Fach, Land of My Fathers and then God Save the King, to which the All Blacks responded with a "weird chant led by Nēpia".

But as fame of their unbeaten status spread, so did the status of their haka. At the beginning of their 22nd game in Wales at Llanelli, we read

On the appearance of the men in red, 'Sosban Fach' was sung with great enthusiasm. Nēpia then led the All Blacks in their famous war dance, which was very impressive. One could almost hear a pin drop while it was rendered. The crowd again sang 'Sosban Fach' in reply.

==== The haka in Finnegans Wake ====
Irish writer James Joyce heard the "Ko Niu Tireni" haka performed at the Invincibles' match at Paris in January 1925. He modified some of the words and used them in his word-play novel Finnegans Wake.

Let us propel us for the frey of the fray! Us, us, beraddy!
Ko Niutirenis hauru leish! A lala!
Ko Niutirenis haururu laleish! Ala lala!
The Wullingthund sturm is breaking.
The sound of maormaoring
The Wellingthund sturm waxes fuercilier.
Finnegans Wake, 2nd ed. 1950, Book II chap iii, page 335.

=== "Kapa o Pango" 2005 ===
Recorded performance of the haka, Dunedin, 2014

Before a Tri Nations match against South Africa on 27 August 2005 at Carisbrook in Dunedin, the All Blacks unexpectedly introduced a new haka, "Kapa o Pango". It featured an extended and aggressive introduction by team captain Tana Umaga highlighted by a drawing of the thumb down the throat. This was interpreted by many as a "throat-slitting" action directed at the opposing team. The All Blacks went on to win the match 31 to 27.

The words to "Kapa o Pango" are more specific to the rugby team than "Ka Mate", referring to the warriors in black and the silver fern.

The new haka was developed by Derek Lardelli of Ngāti Porou by modifying the first verse of "Ko Niu Tirini," the haka used by the 1924 All Blacks. An NZRU press release stated that

Kapa o Pango has been over a year in the making, and was created in consultation with many experts in Māori culture. It will serve as a complement to "Ka Mate" rather than a replacement, to be used for 'special occasions'.

==== Published words and the NZRU explanation ====
"Kapa o Pango"
Kapa o Pango kia whakawhenua au i ahau!	All Blacks, let me become one with the land
Hī aue, hī!
Ko Aotearoa e ngunguru nei!	This is our land that rumbles
Au, au, aue hā!	It's our time! It's our moment!
Ko Kapa o Pango e ngunguru nei!	This defines us as the All Blacks
Au, au, aue hā!	It's our time! It's our moment!
I āhahā!
Ka tū te ihiihi	Our dominance
Ka tū te wanawana	Our supremacy will triumph
Ki runga ki te rangi e tū iho nei, tū iho nei, hī!	And be placed on high
Ponga rā!	Silver fern!
Kapa o Pango, aue hī!	All Blacks!
Ponga rā!	Silver fern!
Kapa o Pango, aue hī, hā!	All Blacks!

==== Words chanted on field, and their literal interpretation ====
Taringa whakarongo!	Let your ears listen
Kia rite! Kia rite! Kia mau! Hī!	Get ready...! Line up...! Steady...! Yeah!
Kia whakawhenua au i ahau!	Let me become one with the land
Hī aue, hī!	(assertive sounds to raise adrenaline levels)
Ko Aotearoa e ngunguru nei!	New Zealand is rumbling here
Au, au, aue hā!
Ko Kapa o Pango e ngunguru nei!	The Team in Black is rumbling here
Au, au, aue hā!
I āhahā!
Ka tū te Ihiihi	Stand up to the fear
Ka tū te Wanawana	Stand up to the terror
Ki runga ki te rangi,	To the sky above,!
E tū iho nei, tū iho nei, hī!	Fight up there, high up there. Yeah!
Ponga rā!	The shadows fall!
Kapa o Pango, aue hī!	Team in Black, yeah!
Ponga rā!	Darkness falls!
Kapa o Pango, aue hī, hā!	Team in Black, Yeah, Ha!

The words of both "Kapa o Pango" and "Ko Niu Tireni" are taken from the haka of the earthquake god Ruaumoko, Ko Ruaumoko e ngunguru nei. The lines beginning Ka tū te ihi-ihi... are found in many old haka. Ponga ra, ponga ra is the opening line of 'Te Kiri Ngutu,' an 1880s lament for stolen territory.

=== "Ko Uhia Mai" 2006 ===
This haka whose literal name is "Let It Be Known" is used by the fifteen-a-side Black Ferns team.

==== The words and their literal interpretation ====
"Ko Uhia Mai"
A uhia mai	Let it be known
Ko wai nga Hine	Who are these women
Ko wai nga Hine	Who are these women
Ko nga Mamaku e ngunguru nei	It's the Black Ferns rumble
Ko Hineahuone, Ko Hinetitama Ko Hinenui te po	From Hineahuone, Hinetitama and Hinenui te po we came
Ki te whaiao, ki te ao marama e	To transfer from the heavens to the world of enlightenment
Hi a haha
Mauri ki te rangi	Life force from above
Me te whenua	Life force from below (earth)
Nga kapua whakapipi	The gathering clouds
Mai nga Maunga titia e	The mountains that pierce the sky
Hi a haha
He tia he tia	Let us proceed
Te Moana nui–a–Kiwa	To the seas
Mai nga topito	From the corners of the island
Ki nga moutere	To the neighbouring islands,
O te ao whanui e	And around the world,
Hi a haha
Tumai ra koe	You stand tall and proud,
Te mana wahine	Women of strength.
Te Wharetangata	Who will bear the future.
Nga Mamaku o Aotearoa	The Black Ferns of New Zealand.
He tia he tia. He ranga he ranga	Rise and press on.
Haere mai te toki	When the challenge arrives.
Haumi ee, hui e	We will gather and unite together.
Taiki ee	Strength together. It will be done.

=== ”Ngā Rongo Toa” ===
The Black Ferns Sevens team use the Ngā Rongo Toa haka. Composed by Tuirina Wehi, this haka is about connecting with ancestors, being hard and swift, seizing the moment and building the legacy of the team. Compared with the hakas in fifteen-a-side rugby which are performed at the start of a game, this haka is performed after the last game of a tournament and is also performed by the team to honour a team members significant career milestones and at their weddings. It is performed by both team members and respective of their gender, coaches and support staff.

==== The words and their literal interpretation ====
"Ngā Rongo Toa"
He tai papaki rua e haruru mai nei,	The clashing of the tides resound
e haruru mai ana!	It is the taste of victory that draws us near
Ko te ihi o te kōtaratara e tō mai nei, e tō mai ana	And we honour the legacy of the champions who precede us
Ngā rongo toa o tea hi pārāweranui e tō mai nei, e tō mai ana	The thrill travels down our spine and we feel the closeness of our ancestors as we alight the battlefield
Ka heke iho te ihi i tōku tuarā me he wehiwehi te pīkau ana it e tāhuna	Their chiefly cloak caresses the shoulders
Te kākahu rangatira e miri nei i ngā pokohiwi a taku tira māia e haruru mai nei, e haruru mai ana!	Their chiefly cloak caresses the shoulders of this valiant team that roars in full force
Korekore rawa ahau e piko	We will not submit
Kia eke panuku (Hī)	Hit hard!
Eke hohoro (Hī)	Be swift!
Eke! Eke! Eke Tangaroa e!	Fight to the end!
Hei kawe i tōku kauae ki āpōpō! Anei! Anā!	in order that the legacy will endure into the future Here we are! Seize it! It is done!

== Responses and controversies ==
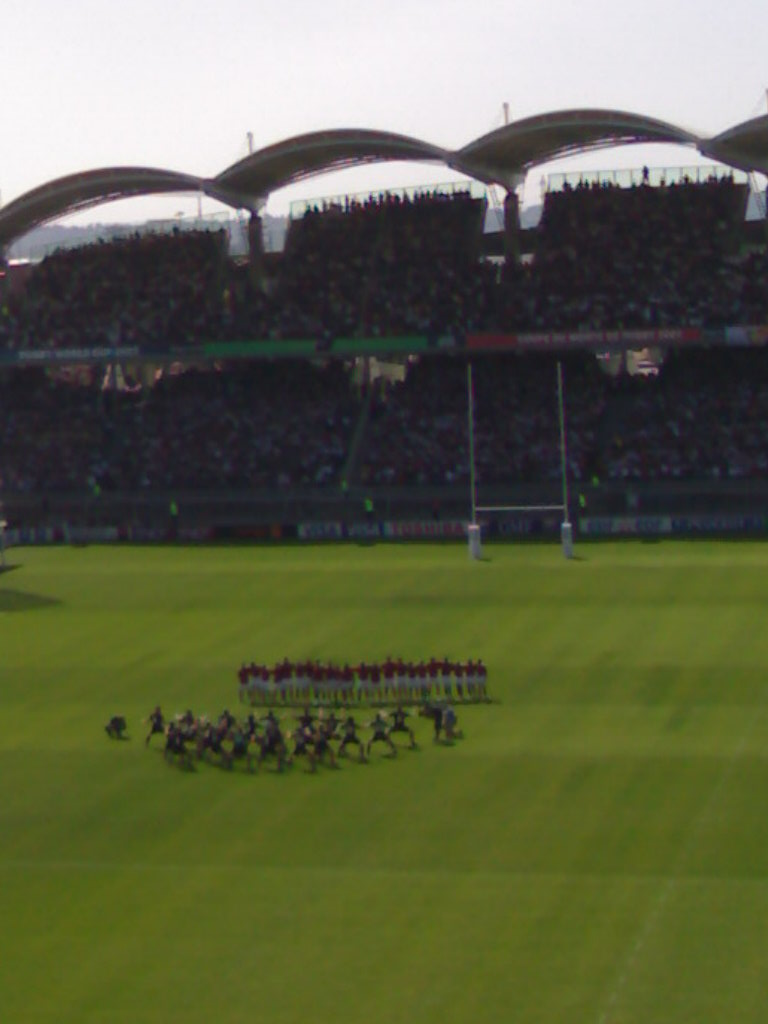
Haka prior to a game against Portugal in Lyon, France.

The haka, while normally enjoyed by spectators, has been criticised as an unsporting attempt to intimidate the opposition before the match begins. However, most teams accept that the haka is part of rugby's heritage and face up to the All Blacks during its performance, with both teams standing about 10 metres apart. The 2007 Portuguese Rugby team Captain Vasco Uva said of the haka that "[We] faced it, gave it the respect it deserved and it gave us motivation and we knew if it gave them strength, it was also a point of strength for us."

Ignoring the haka is a tactic sometimes used by opposing teams. Famously, the Australian rugby team did a warm up drill well away from the All Blacks during their 1996 test match in Wellington. More recently, the Italian rugby team ignored the haka during a 2007 World Cup Pool Match. All Black team member, Keven Mealamu, said later that in his opinion the snub had backfired and provided motivation to his team. Australian back David Campese often ignored the haka, most notably in the 1991 World Cup semi-final victory over the All Blacks, when he chose to practice warm-up drills instead of facing the All Blacks.

In 1989, as the All Blacks were performing the haka in Lansdowne Road before playing Ireland, the Irish lined up in a tight V formation to facing New Zealand and then edged closer and closer to the All Blacks. By the time the end of the haka came, captain Willie Anderson was only inches from Buck Shelford's face.

In 1997, Richard Cockerill was disciplined for responding to the haka before the start of an England vs. All Blacks game. Cockerill went toe-to-toe with his opposite number Norm Hewitt while they performed the haka. The referee became so concerned that Hewitt and Cockerill would begin fighting that he pushed Cockerill away from Hewitt. Cockerill went on to say afterwards "I believe that I did the right thing that day," he said. "They were throwing down a challenge and I showed them I was ready to accept it. I'm sure they would rather we did that than walk away." In recent times when the haka is performed against England, it is often drowned out by England fans singing "Swing Low, Sweet Chariot", causing critics to demand respect towards the cultural symbol. Similarly, Ireland fans have recently drowned out the haka by singing "The Fields of Athenry".

In 2005, Australian rugby league player Willie Mason was caught on camera swearing at New Zealand full back Brent Webb during the haka before a Rugby League Tri-Nations match in Auckland. Mason states he was taking exception to Webb, who was born in Cairns, Queensland, Australia performing the traditional haka.

In 2005, the All Blacks agreed to a request from the Welsh Rugby Union to repeat the sequence of events from the original match a century before in 1905. This involved the All Blacks performing the haka after "God Defend New Zealand" and before "Hen Wlad fy Nhadau". For the November 2006 test, the Welsh Rugby Union demanded a repeat of this sequence. The All Blacks refused, and instead chose to perform the haka in their changing room before the match. All Blacks captain Richie McCaw defended the decision by stating that the haka was "integral to New Zealand culture and the All Blacks' heritage" and "if the other team wants to mess around, we'll just do the haka in the shed". The crowd reacted negatively to the lack of the haka and then being shown brief footage of the haka on the screens at the Millennium Stadium. In 2006, the Seven Network TV channel in Australia aired a commercial which used digital enhancement to add handbags to video of New Zealand rugby players performing the haka. This was inspired by an incident when former All Black captain Tana Umaga struck Hurricanes teammate Chris Masoe over the head with a woman's handbag after the Super 14 final. All Blacks assistant coach Wayne Smith criticised the advertisement, saying "It is insensitive, I think, to Māori and disrespectful of the All Blacks".

The "Kapa o Pango" haka created controversy when the gesture of a thumb drawn down the throat was interpreted by many observers as implying throat slitting. The All Blacks and Māori interpreted it as drawing the breath of life into the heart and lungs ("hauora"). This led to calls for it to be banned, although a poll conducted in July 2006 showed 60 percent support in New Zealand. During Ireland's tour of New Zealand, the NZRU put the haka on a temporary hiatus, to review its appropriateness, by asking the All Blacks not to perform it against Ireland.

In the 2007 Rugby World Cup quarter-finals, France, after having won the coin toss for the choice of uniforms, wore the blue/white/red of the French flag and walked up to within a metre of the haka performance, forming a line of opposition to the performance by the All Blacks, who were wearing a predominantly silver uniform (as opposed to the traditional all black). France went on to beat the All Blacks 20–18.

In the 2008 Rugby Autumn Tests, Wales responded to the haka by standing on the pitch refusing to move until the All Blacks did. This resulted in the referee Jonathan Kaplan berating both teams for a full two minutes after the haka had ended until eventually New Zealand captain McCaw instructed his team to break off. After a spirited first half display which ended with Wales leading 9–6, the All Blacks responded positively and won the game 9–29.

In the 2019 Rugby World Cup semi-finals, England fanned out across the pitch and adopted a V-shaped formation before the All Blacks began their haka. As the All Blacks delivered the challenge, several English players crossed the halfway line and stood their ground when officials tried to usher them back. After the match, the IRB issued England with a fine of £2,000 for having have breached World Cup 2019 rules relating to cultural challenges, which states that no players from the team receiving the challenge may advance beyond the halfway line. England went on to win the match 19–7, advancing to meet South Africa in the final, which they would lose 32–12.

In the 2024 Autumn Internationals, England stepped up to the halfway line during the haka while supporters chanted "Swing Low, Sweet Chariot". This was reciprocated by the All Blacks. The week afterwards, Ireland stepped forwards after the All Blacks began to advance.

In the 2025 Autumn Internationals, England were once again criticised by some New Zealanders, notably Justin Marshall, for their response to the Haka. In particular the supporters singing "Swing Low" over the Haka and Henry Pollock licking his lips were both criticised. Despite sinking to 0-12 down, England went on to comprehensively defeat the All Blacks 33-19.

During a 2026 tour match between the All Blacks and South African side Sharks, Sharks player-coach and All Blacks legend Ma'a Nonu responded to the All Blacks' "Kama Te" haka with a solo rendition of the "Kapa o Pango" haka. Nonu consulted with the All Blacks the night before the match to ensure his response would not be considered disrespectful. New Zealand won the match 54-0.

== Use after matches ==
New Zealand national sports teams have occasionally performed the haka (usually Ka Mate) as part of their victory celebrations after winning matches. This is not done as a challenge or sign of triumph over the opposing team, but is instead directed at fans and other spectators as a thank you for support. The haka is also occasionally performed in this context to honour individual players achieving important career milestones. This habit is particularly prevalent for the New Zealand national rugby sevens team.

== Use by other teams ==
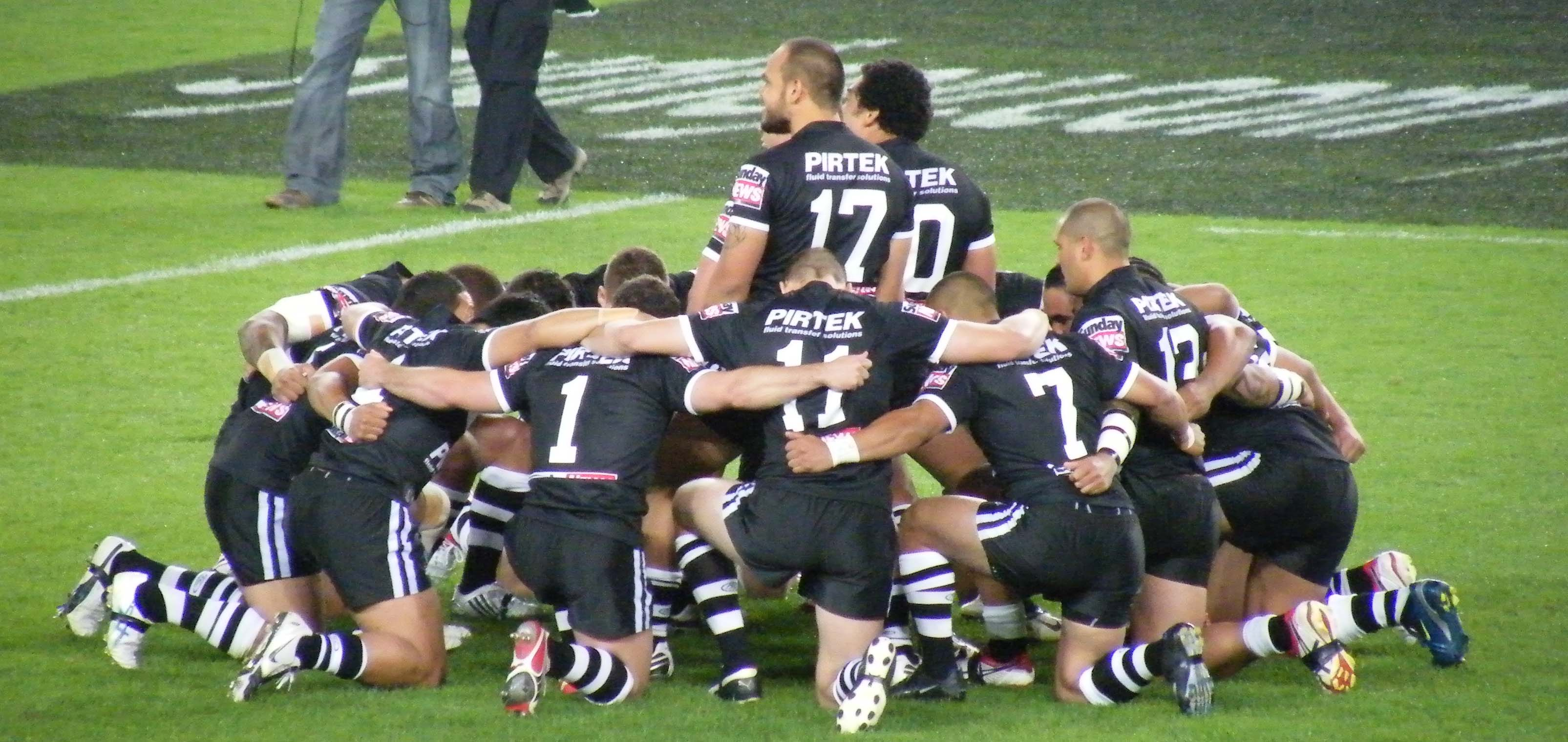
The New Zealand rugby league team performing the haka at the 2008 World Cup

Other New Zealand sports teams have similarly performed a haka before a match. The tradition of performing a haka before every test match is just as strong with the Kiwis, the New Zealand national rugby league team, performing it before every game. Traditionally they performed the "Ka Mate" haka, but starting at the 2013 Rugby League World Cup they perform a team-specific haka called "Te Iwi Kiwi". It is also performed by the Australian rules football team and Tall Blacks. In the documentary Murderball, the New Zealand paralympic rugby team can be seen performing a modified version of a haka.

When Munster hosted the All Blacks at Thomond Park, Limerick in November 2008, the four New Zealand players in the Munster team performed their own haka prior to the All Blacks.

At the opening parade of the 2002 Commonwealth Games in Manchester, the New Zealand team stopped in front of the Queen and performed a haka.

New Zealand teams have attracted some criticism for performing haka, on occasions such as winning a swim relay bronze medal.

In 2009, Ice Blacks did their haka before their ice hockey match against Australia. The Tall Blacks performed the dance prior to its games in the 2014 FIBA tournament, including a contest against the United States, where video of the dance was widely circulated and sparked discussion.

The Black Sticks, the (field) hockey team, also perform a haka.

During the 2013 PDC World Cup of Darts, team New Zealand, consisting of Phillip Hazel and Craig Caldwell performed a haka ahead of their match against Australia.

The high-profile of the All Blacks, and their use of haka has led other Pacific teams to use similar dances from their own cultures, such as the Cibi, Kailao, and Siva tau. Other teams from the Pacific and elsewhere however have performed the "Ka Mate" or "Kapa o Pango" haka. For instance, the "Kapa o Pango" haka was used by the University of Hawaii Warriors in 2006, before they created their own war dance, the "Haʻa", in the Hawaiian language with original movements.

== See also ==
- Kapa haka
- Māori music
- Traditional war dances of other rugby nations:
  - Cibi (Fiji)
  - Hako (Rapa Nui) (Easter Island)
  - Kailao or Sipi Tau (Tonga)
  - Siva tau (Samoa)
  - Aboriginal war dance (Australia)
