= Siva Tau =

Samoan war dance

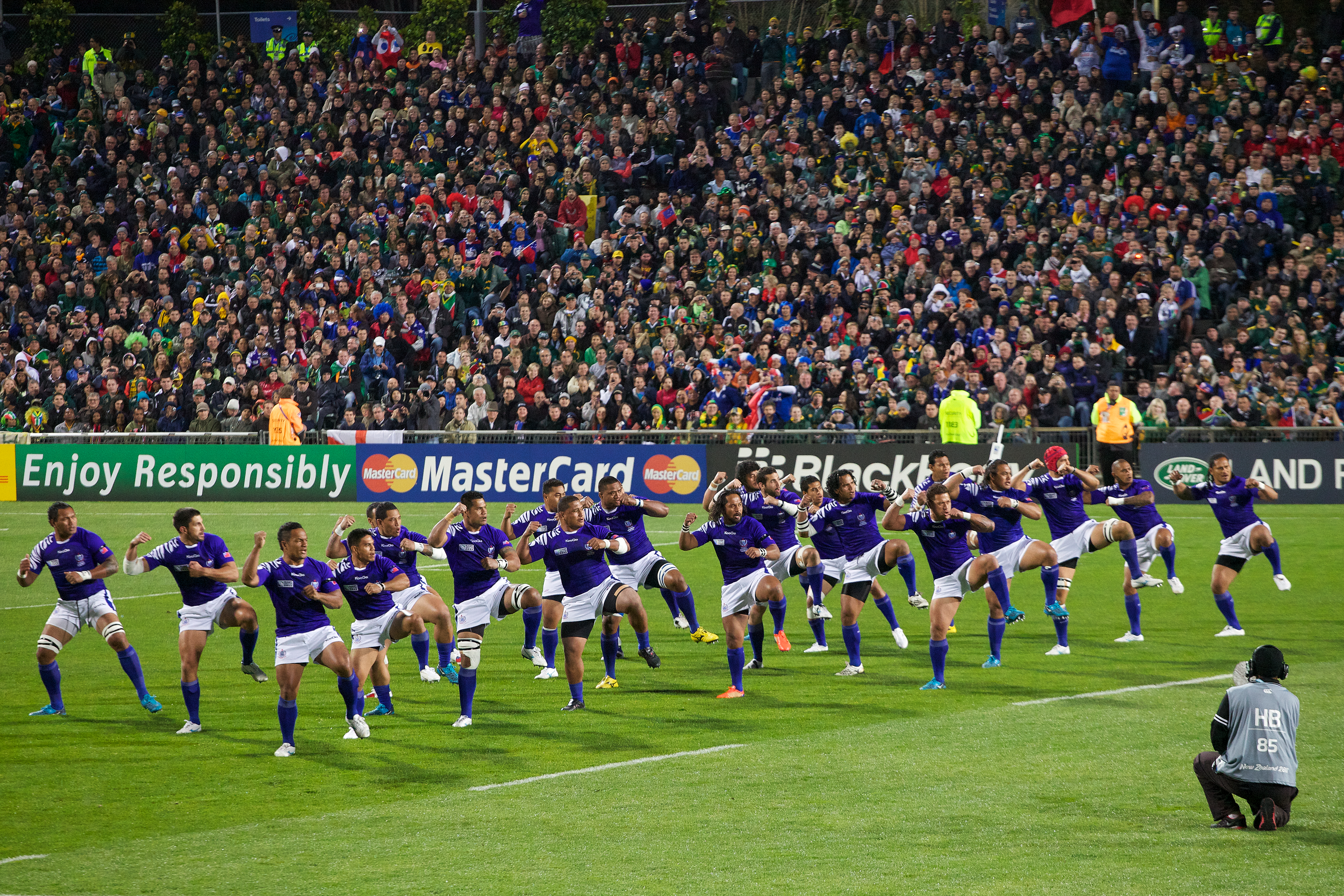
Samoan rugby union team performing Siva Tau before the game against South Africa during the 2011 Rugby World Cup.

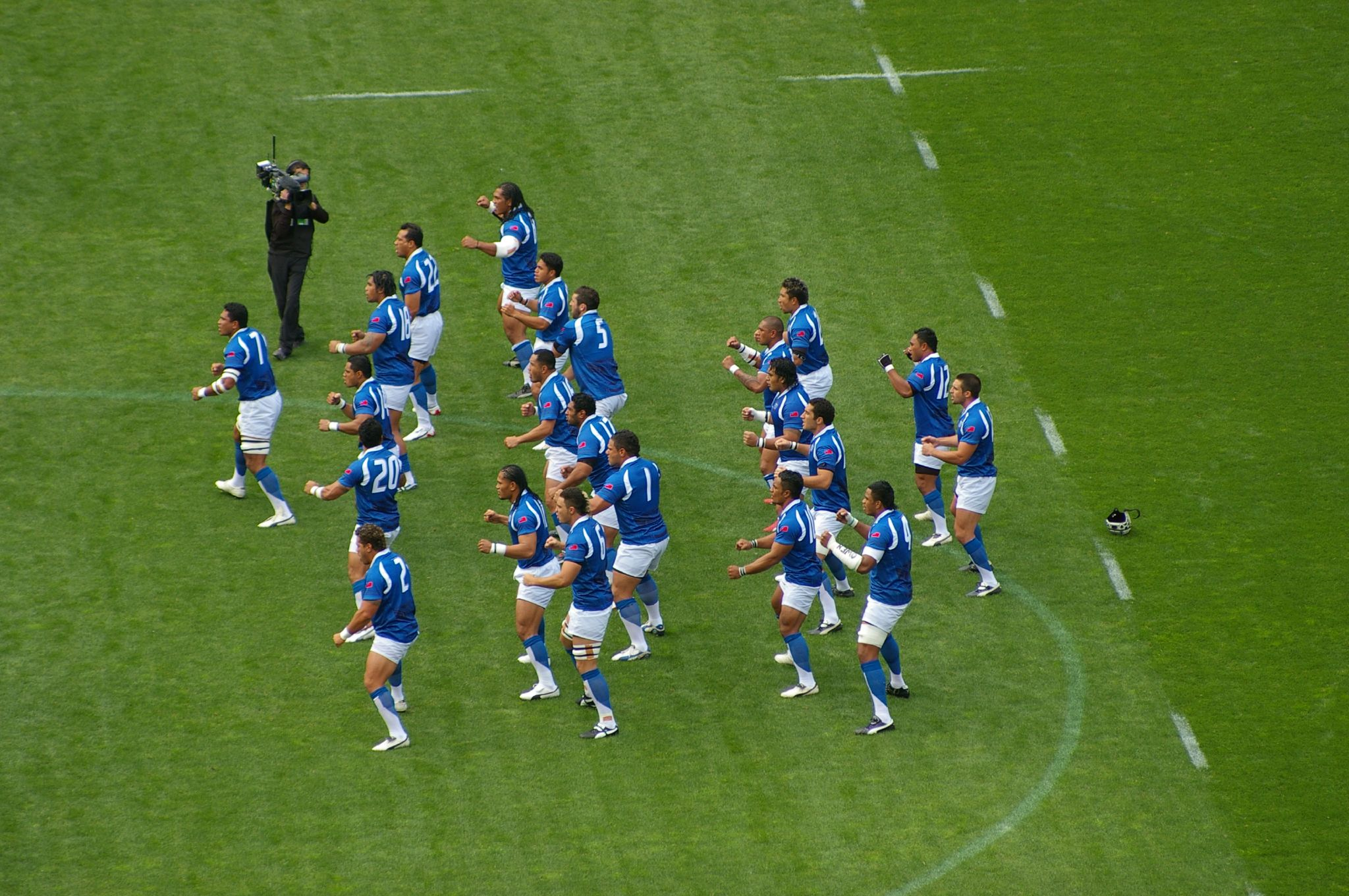
Samoan rugby union team performing Siva Tau before the game against South Africa during the 2007 Rugby World Cup.

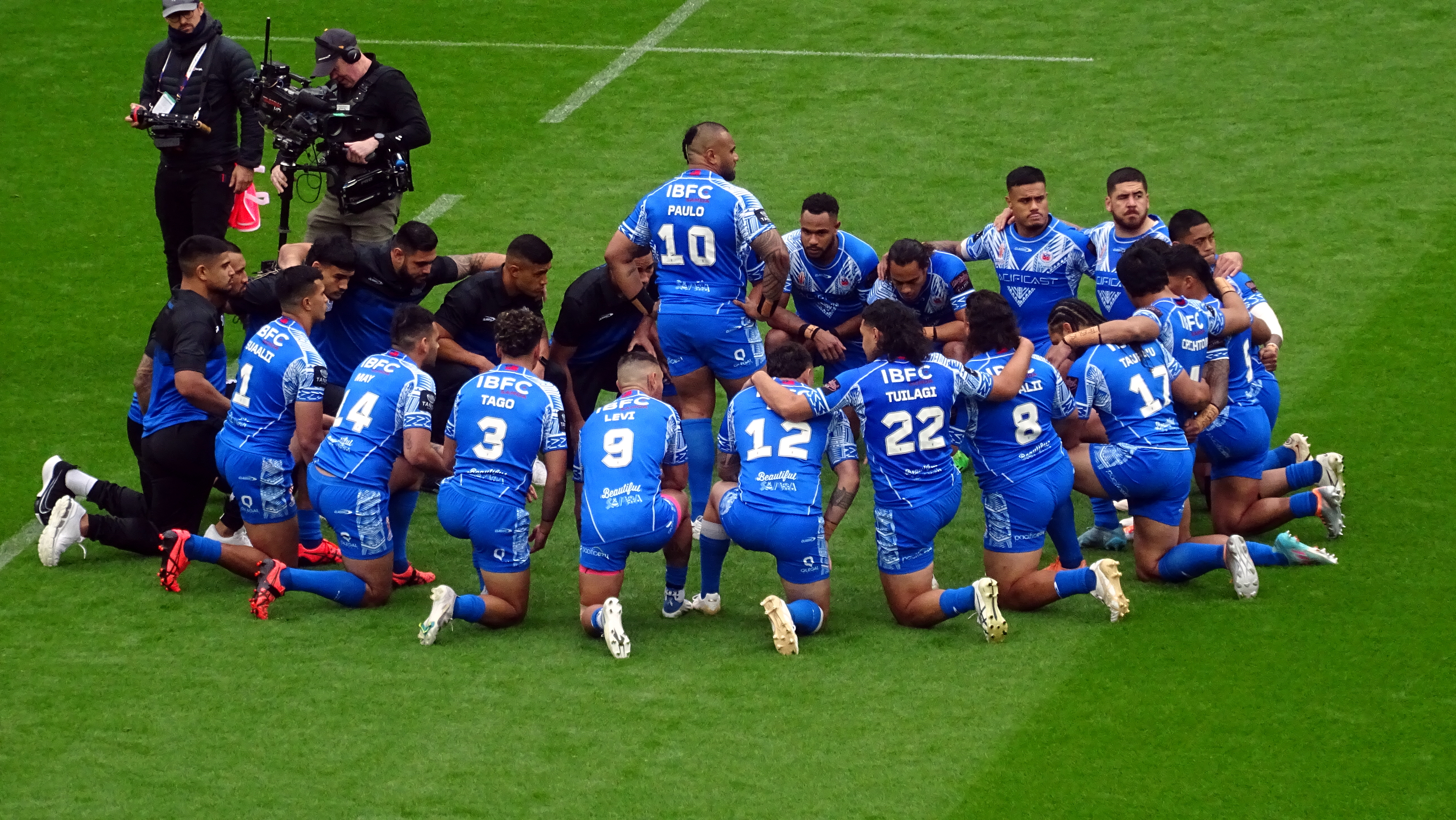
Samoan rugby league team starting the Siva Tau before the game against England during the 2021 Rugby League World Cup.

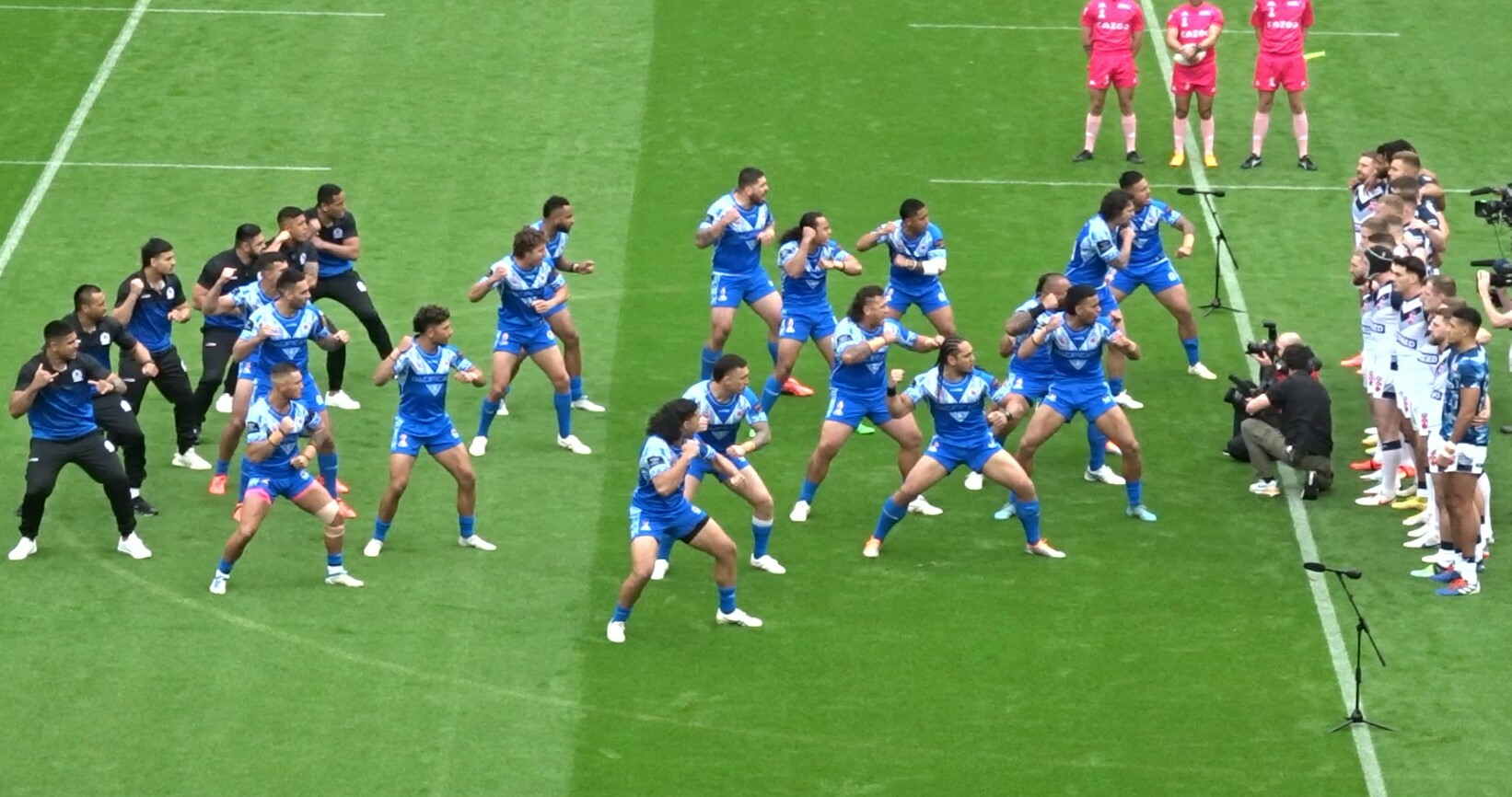
Samoan rugby league team midway through the Siva Tau before the game against England during the 2021 Rugby League World Cup

The Manu Siva Tau is a Samoan war dance, performed by the Samoan sporting teams before each match.

The national rugby union team used to perform the traditional 'Maulu'ulu Moa' on tour. Prior to the 1991 World Cup, the 'Manu' war chant was composed; it was considered more effective at psyching up players.

The national Australian rules football team performs the Siva Tau at its International Cup appearances.

In WWE, The Usos, as faces, performed the Siva Tau as part of their ring entrance.

The Toa Samoa national rugby league team also perform the Siva Tau before each match (with the "Toa" replacing "Manu" in the words).

The song "Le Manu" by the New Zealand metal band Shepherds Reign has the lyrics of the Siva Tau as performed by the Manu Samoa.

== Words ==
"Siva Tau"
Samoan language	English language
Leader: Samoa!	Samoa!
Sauni e tau le taua!	Ready for the war!
Tau e matua tau!	Fight fiercely!
Fai ia mafai!	Work to achieve!
Le Manu!	The Manu!
Team: Sau ia!	Let's go!
Le Manu Samoa e ua malo ona fai o le faiva Le Manu Samoa e ua malo ona fai o le faiva	The Manu Samoa, may you succeed in your mission The Manu Samoa, may you succeed in your mission
Le Manu Samoa lenei ua ou sau	The Manu Samoa here we have come
Leai se isi Manu oi le atu laulau	There is no other Manu (team) anywhere
Ua ou sau nei ma le mea atoa	Here I come completely prepared
O lou malosi ua atoatoa	My strength is at its peak
Ia e faatafa ma e soso ese	Make way and move aside
Leaga o lenei manu e uiga ese	Because this Manu is unique
Le Manu Samoa	The Manu Samoa
Le Manu Samoa	The Manu Samoa
Le Manu Samoa e o mai I Samoa	The Manu Samoa reigns from Samoa
Le Manu!	The Manu!

== Alternate versions ==
During the 2007 Rugby World Cup, the Samoa national rugby union team used a more aggressive version of the Siva Tau. However, this version was dropped by the Manu Samoa before the 2007 Rugby World Cup match against United States in favour of the original version.

"Siva Tau"
Leader: Samoa!
Samoa!
Sauni ia tau le taua!!
Ready for the battle!
Ia tau matua tau!
Fight fiercely!
Ia fai ia mafai!
Work to achieve!
Le Manu Samoa e!
The Manu Samoa!
Team: O a'u le Manu,

O a'u le Manu, Samoa!

I am the Manu,

I am the Manu, Samoa!

Leader:Toe sau
Again!
Team: O a'u le Manu,

O a'u le Manu, Samoa!

I am the Manu,

I am the Manu, Samoa!

Leader: Ia tau matua tau!
Let's go to the war!
Team: Tau tau tau matua tau!
Fight! Fight! Fight fiercely!
Leader:Toe tau!
Never give up!
Team: Tau tau tau matua tau!
Fight! Fight! Fight fiercely!
Leader:Ia fai ia mafai
Work to achieve!
Team: O lo'u fatu lea,
Here is my heart
O lo'u loto lea,
Here is my soul,
O a'u o le toa!
I am a warrior!
Leader: Sau ia!
Let's go!
Ia e faatafa ma e soso ese
Make way and move aside
Leaga o lenei manu e uiga ese
Because this Manu is unique
Le Manu Samoa
The Manu Samoa
Le Manu Samoa
The Manu Samoa
O a'u o le toa
I am a warrior
O'au le Manu, Samoa!
I am the Manu, Samoa!

This version of the Siva Tau, similar to the version used by the Manu Samoa in the 2007 Rugby World Cup, is used by the Samoa national rugby league team, however, differently from the prior version, the final lines are similar to the Siva Tau performed by the Manu Samoa.

"Toa Samoa Siva Tau"
Samoa, o ai le Toa?
Samoa, are you brave?
Team: O ai le Toa!

O ai le Toa, Samoa!

We are the brave!,

We are the Toa, Samoa!

Samoa, o ai le Toa?
Samoa, are you brave?
Team: O ai le Toa!

O ai le Toa, Samoa!

We are the brave!,

We are the Toa, Samoa!

Leader: Samoa, tatou o tatou tau!
Samoa, let's fight!
Team: Tau tau tau ia matua tau!
Fight! Fight! Fight fiercely!
Leader: Samoa, tatou o tatou tau!
Samoa, let's fight!
Team: Tau tau tau ia matua tau!
Fight! Fight! Fight fiercely!
Ia e faatafa ma e soso ese
Make way and move aside
Leaga o lenei toa e uiga ese
Because this Toa is unique
Le Toa Samoa
The Toa Samoa
Le Toa Samoa
The Toa Samoa
Le Toa Samoa e mai I Samoa
The Toa Samoa reigns from Samoa
Le Toa!
The Toa!

== See also ==
- Haka
- Cibi
- Kailao
