= Cibi =

Fijian type of dance

The Cibi (Fijian pronunciation: [ˈðimbi] DHIM-bee) is a Fijian meke of Bauan origin and war dance, generally performed before or after a battle. It came to prominence in the rugby field in 1939 when it was performed by the Fiji national rugby union team before the match. It is also known as Teivovo ("war fence", from tei voavoa, 'planting on abandoned land').

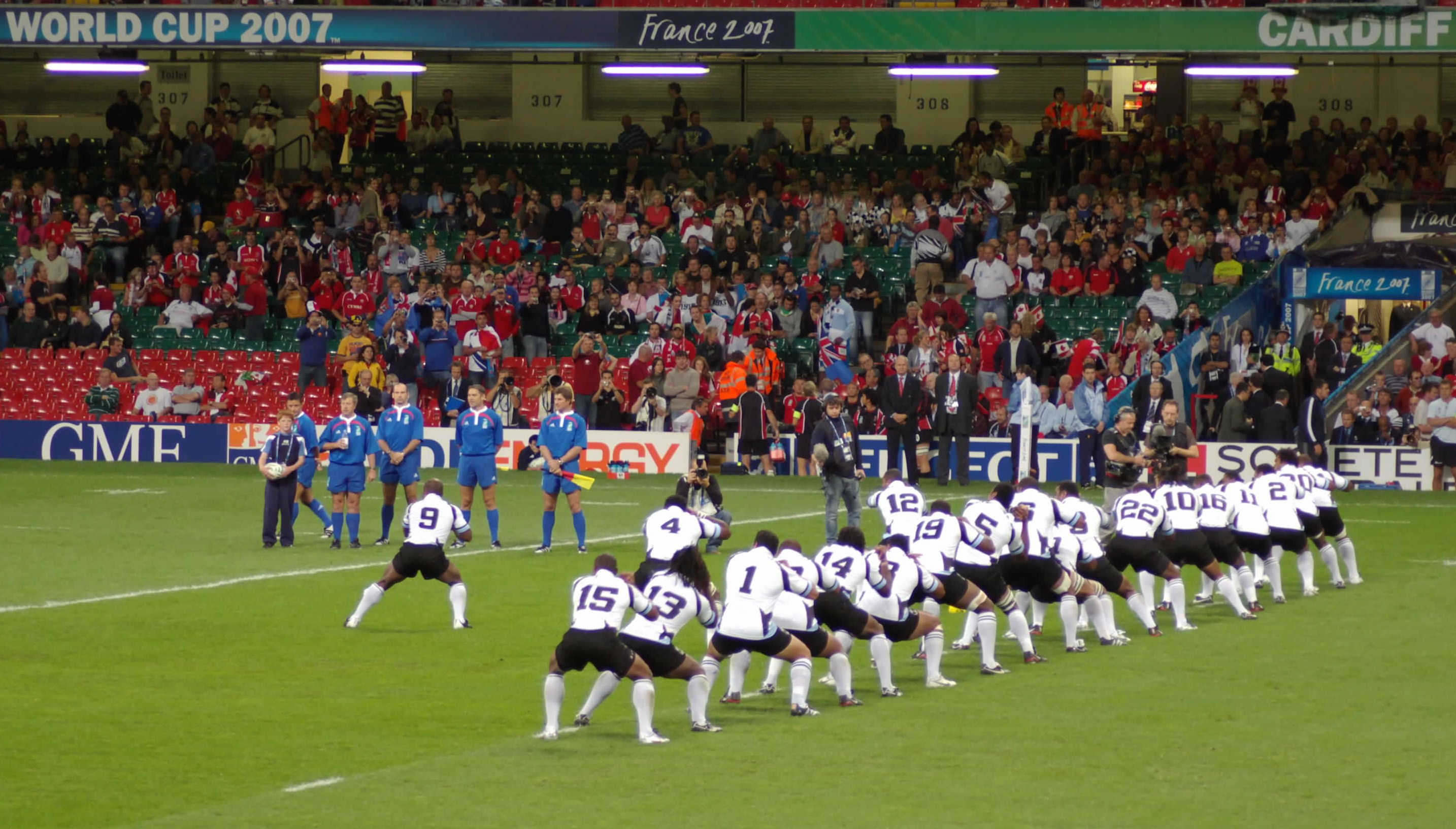
Fijian Rugby Union Team Performing the Cibi before a 2007 Rugby World Cup game

== Origins ==
The origins of the cibi date back to the country's warring times with their Pacific neighbours and intertribal warfare. On their return home the warriors heralded their victory by displaying flags – one for every enemy slain. They were met by the women who would sing songs with accompanying gestures. The cibi was meant for open battle to inspire the troops, but it was sung with more vigour when the victorious army returned home to celebrate.

In 1939, when Fiji prepared for its first-ever tour of New Zealand, the captain, Ratu Sir George Cakobau, thought his team should have a war dance to match the All Blacks' haka. He approached Ratu Bola, the high chief of the warrior clan of Navusaradave in Bau, who taught them the Cibi which has been adopted as Fiji's pre-match ritual ever since and went on to become the only team to remain unbeaten on a full tour of New Zealand.

== The chant ==
	Fijian		Translation
Leader's command	Vakarau! Cibi!		Get ready! Cibi!
Leader's call	Tei vovo, tei vovo!	(twice)	The war-fence, the war-fence!
Team response	E ya, e ya, e ya!	(twice)	Oh, oh, oh!
Leader's call	Rai tu mai, rai tu mai!	(twice)	Look here, look here!
Team response	Oi au a virviri kemu bai!	(twice)	I attack your defences!
Leader's call	Tuletule buka!	(twice)	I turn the tree to uproot it!
Team response	E ya!	(twice)	Oh!
Together	Tuletule buka e sa dredre Tou vaka tosoya vakamalua E ya, e ya, e ya, e ya!		The tree is out of the ground Slowly, we are able to move it. Oh, oh, oh, oh!

The cibi had perhaps been used incorrectly though, as the word actually means "a celebration of victory by warriors", "a dance of triumph" whereas bole or ibole is the acceptance of a challenge. For this reason, the Cibi was replaced in 2012 with the new Bole (pronounced [ˈᵐbole] mbo-lay) war cry. The Bole war cry has a lot more energy compared to the Cibi and seems far more fitting for the gruelling match that is about to commence, However, after the 2012 Pacific Nations Rugby Cup, the Cibi returned to be used.

The Bole however has not been used after the 2012 Pacific Nations Rugby Cup match against Tonga. The Flying Fijians have opted to use the Cibi for the rest of their matches. The current reason for the team removing the Bole is unknown.

Composed by Ratu Manoa Rasigatale, the Bole is translated as follows:

Fijian

Teivovo, teivovo
Io, io, io, io;
Teivovo, teivovo
Io, io, io, io

Rai tu mai, rai tu mai
Oi au a virviri kemu bai
Rai tu mai, rai tu mai
Oi au a virviri kemu bai

Iko na toa yalewa
Veico, veico, veico
Au tabu moce oi au
Au moce ga e domo ni biau

Luvu koto kina nomu waqa
Kaya beka au sa luvu sara
Nomu bai e wawa mere
Au tokia ga ka tasere

Tuletule buka e sa dredre
Tuletule buka e sa dredre
Tuletule buka e sa dredre
Io, io, io, io;

English

I'm challenging you to be uprooted
Yes, it will be done
Let's turn them up side down"
Yes, it will be done

You think I'm afraid of you,
You can't break my defence,
You think I'm afraid of you,
You can't break my defence,

You're only a hen, I'm the rooster,
Let's fight and you'll see
I don't sleep and will watch you.
My strength can reach the crushing of the waves

I will not be drowned,
You think you'll defeat me by drowning?
Your fence is only made of creepers
It's easy to untangle

I can uproot you,
I can uproot you.
I can uproot you.
Yes, it will be achieved.

== See also ==
- Haka (sports)
- Kailao
- Sipi Tau
- Siva tau
