= Kailao =

Type of dance

The kailao is a cultural dance from the South Pacific country of Tonga. It originates from Wallis and Futuna.

== History ==
The kailao originated on the island collectivity of Wallis and Futuna, where it is still performed in public ceremonies. In Tonga it is performed at public and private ceremonies. The men, bearing stylized clubs (pate kailao), dance in a fierce manner that emulates fighting, to the accompaniment of a beaten slit drum or tin box which sets the tempo. Unlike most other Tongan dances, it is performed without singing. The sequences of movements are called by the lead dancer, who calls out the names of the sequences and signals when to do them. They can involve mock combat between dancers, changes in formation, and tricks involving the pate kailao themselves. The moves display the dancers' discipline, obedience, and skills with their weapons. A similar Rotuman dance, also derived from the 'Uvean original, is similarly called the ka'loa.

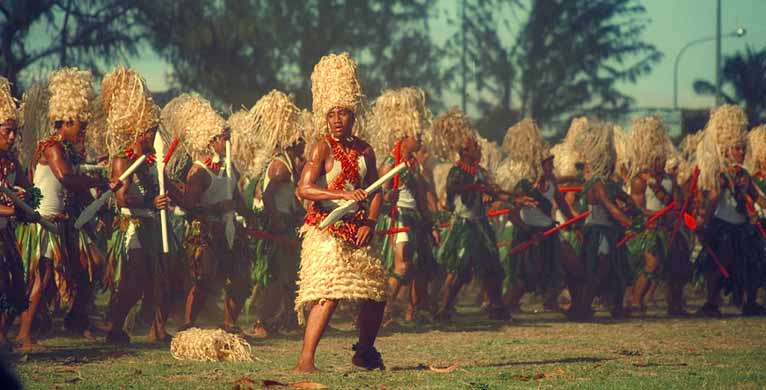
Tonga College students performing a kailao for the King's 70th birthday (1988)

The 'Ikale Tahi, the Tongan national rugby union team, used to perform the kailao with kailao clubs or sticks, as they did against Wales in 1974. In the 1980s, they stopped performing the kailao and switched to the sipi tau, which is performed without sticks, as it was considered more appropriate for the non-ceremonial setting.

== Lyrics (Tongan) ==
Ei ʻe! (Leader)
E!
Ei ʻe! (Leader)
E!
(Leader)
Teu lea pea tala ki mamani katoa
Ko e 'Ikale Tahi kuo halofia.

Ke 'ilo 'e he sola mo e taka
Ko e 'aho ni teu tamate tangata,
'A e haafe mo e tautua'a
Kuo hu'i hoku anga tangata.

Ei ʻe! (Leader)
E!
Ei ʻe! (Leader)
E!

Teu peluki e molo mo e foueti taka,
Pea ngungu mo ha loto fita'a
Ngungu! (Leader)
ʻIo!
Ngungu! (Leader)
ʻIo!
Ngungu! (Leader)
ʻIo!
Teu inu e 'oseni,
Pea kana mo e afi
Keu mate ai he ko hoku loto.

Ko Tonga pe mate ki he moto! (Leader)
Ko Tonga pe mate ki he moto!

== Lyrics (English) ==
Aye, ay! Aye, ay!
(Leader)
I shall speak to the whole world
The Sea Eagles are famished unfurl.

Let the foreigner and sojourner beware
Today, destroyer of souls, I am everywhere
To the halfback and backs
Gone has my humanness.

Hey! hey! (Leader)
Aye!
Hey hey! (Leader)
Aye!

Maul and loose forwards shall I mow
And crunch any fierce hearts you know
Crunch! (Leader)
Aye!
Crunch! (Leader)
Aye!
Crunch! (Leader)
Aye!
Ocean I drink,
and fire I dine!
To death or victory my will is fine.

That's how Tonga dies to her motto! (Leader)
To her motto Tonga gives all.

== Sipi Tau (Rugby Union) ==
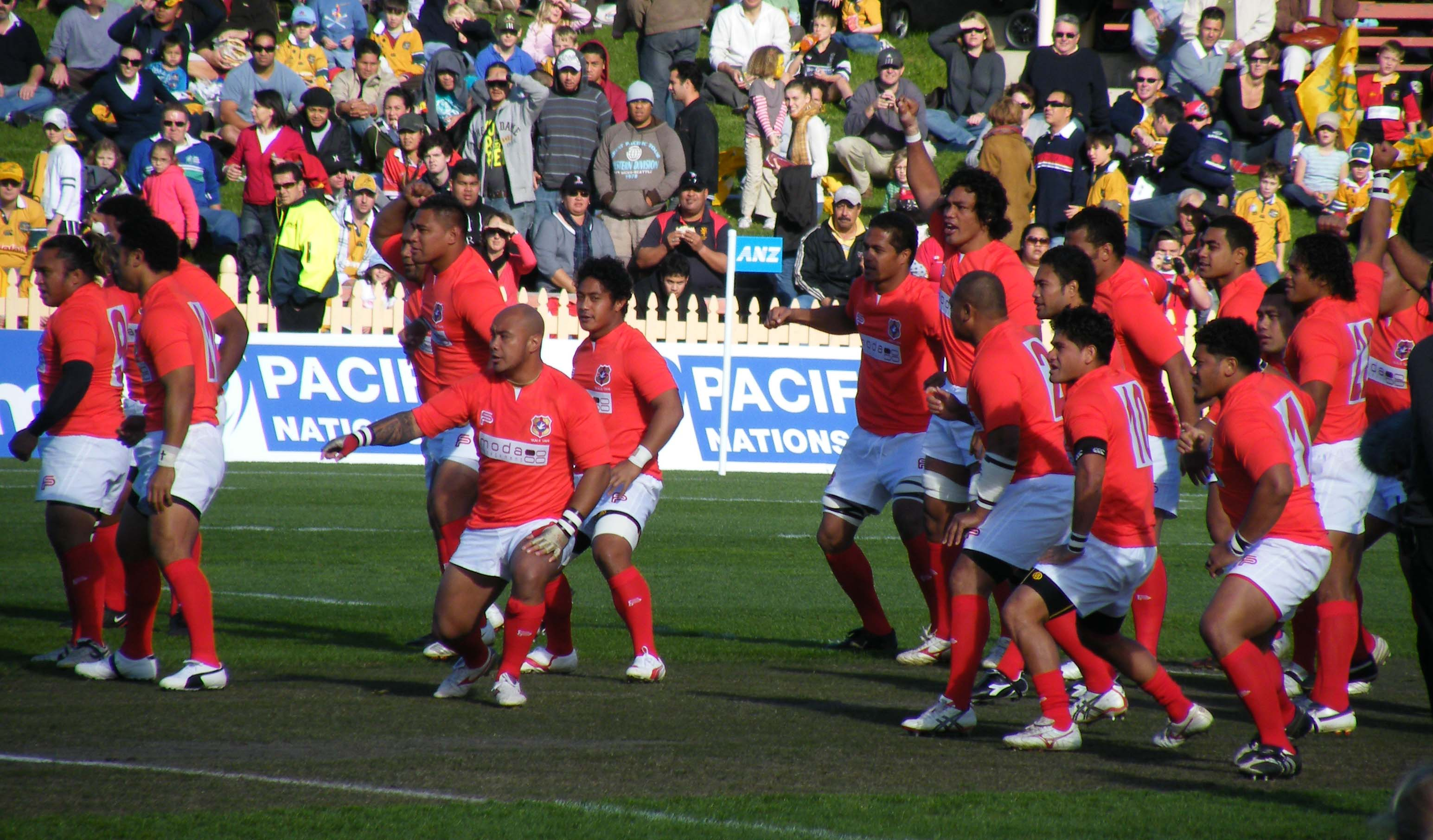
The Tonga national rugby union team performing the Sipi Tau before a match

The Tonga rugby union national team's pre-game challenge, the Sipi Tau was penned by King Tama Tu'i Tāufaʻāhau Tupou IV in 1994, but its origins can be traced back much further. In Tonga in the pre-1800s there were no challenges before war. Indeed, talking was considered a sign of weakness in battle. But in the 19th century a war dance was introduced from the neighbouring Wallis and Futuna Islands and Tonga quickly annexed it. There have been several different Sipi Tau used by the Tongan rugby team over the years, but it is unsure when they were first used in rugby. The latest one was composed in honour of a short, successful tour of New Zealand in 1994. The current words were first used in the 2011 Rugby World Cup.

=== Tongan (current words) ===
Sipi Tau a'e 'Ikale Tahi

Teu ke tau! (Leader)
Tonga! (Team)
Teu lea pea tala ki mamani katoa
Ko e ʻIkale Tahi kuo halofia.
Ke ʻilo ʻe he sola mo e taka
Ko e ʻaho ni te u tamate tangata,
'A e haafe mo e tautuaʻa
Kuo huʻi hoku anga tangata.

Ei ʻe! (Leader)
E!
Ei ʻe! (Leader)
E!

Te u peluki e molo mo e foueti taka,
Pea ngungu mo ha loto fitaʻa
Ngungu! (Leader)
ʻIo!
Ngungu! (Leader)
ʻIo!

Ko Tonga pe mate ki he moto (Leader)
Otua mo Tonga ko hoku tofi'a
Ei e! (Leader)
TONGA!

=== English translation (current words) ===
Leader:Get ready to the battle!
Team:Tonga!
I shall speak to the whole world
The Sea Eagles are famished unfurl.
Let the foreigner and sojourner beware
Today, destroyer of souls, I am everywhere
To the halfback and backs
Gone has my humanness.

Leader:Hey! hey!
Ay!
Leader:Aye!
Aye!
Maul and loose forwards shall I mow
And crunch any fierce hearts you know

Leader:Crunch!
Yeah!
Leader:Crunch!
Yeah!
That's how Tonga dies to her motto
God and Tonga are my inheritance.

Leader:Aye, ay!
Tonga!

== Sipi Tau (Rugby League) ==
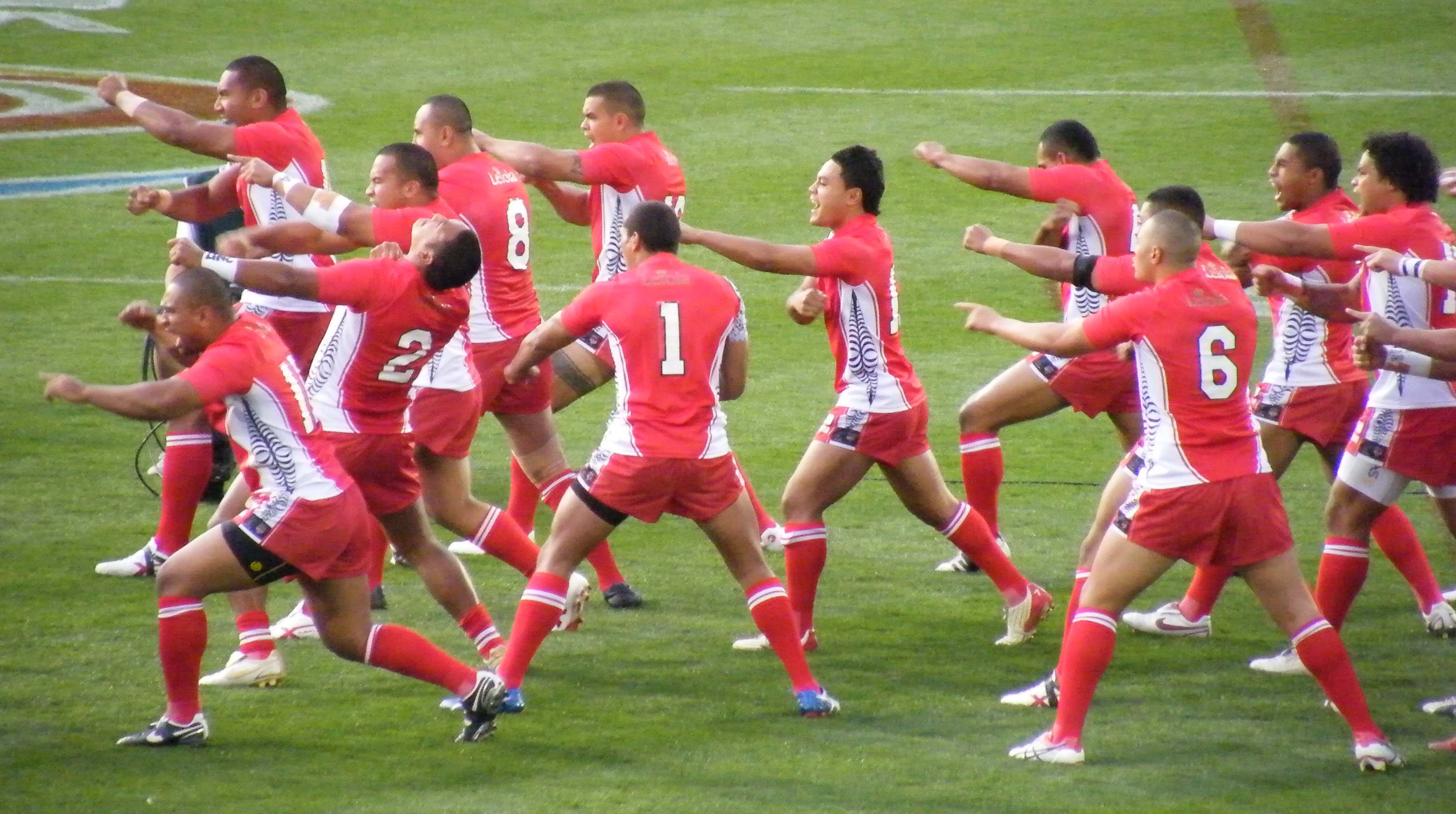
The Tonga national rugby league team performing the Sipi Tau before a match during the 2008 Rugby League World Cup

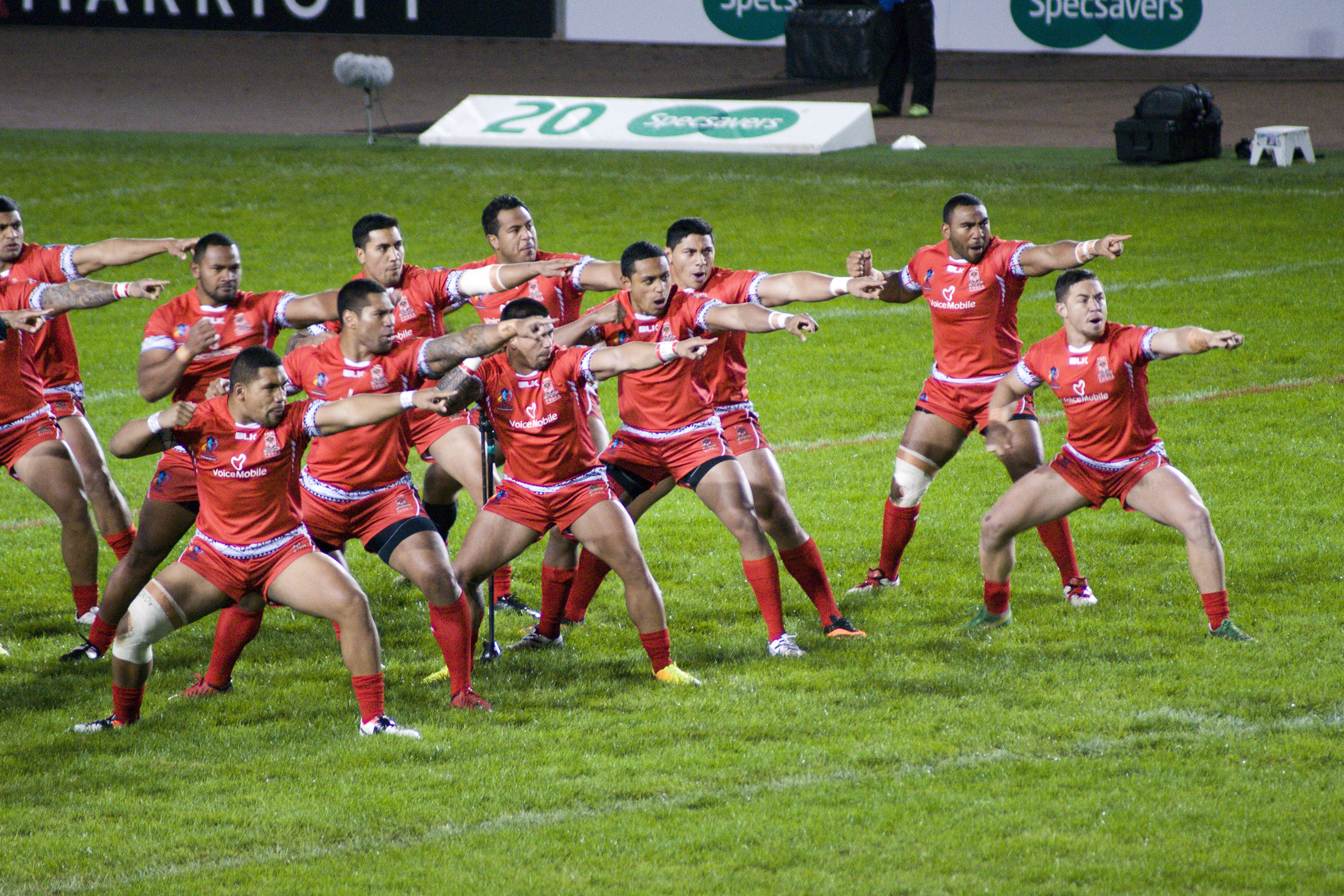
Tonga performing the Sipi Tau before a match during the 2013 Rugby League World Cup

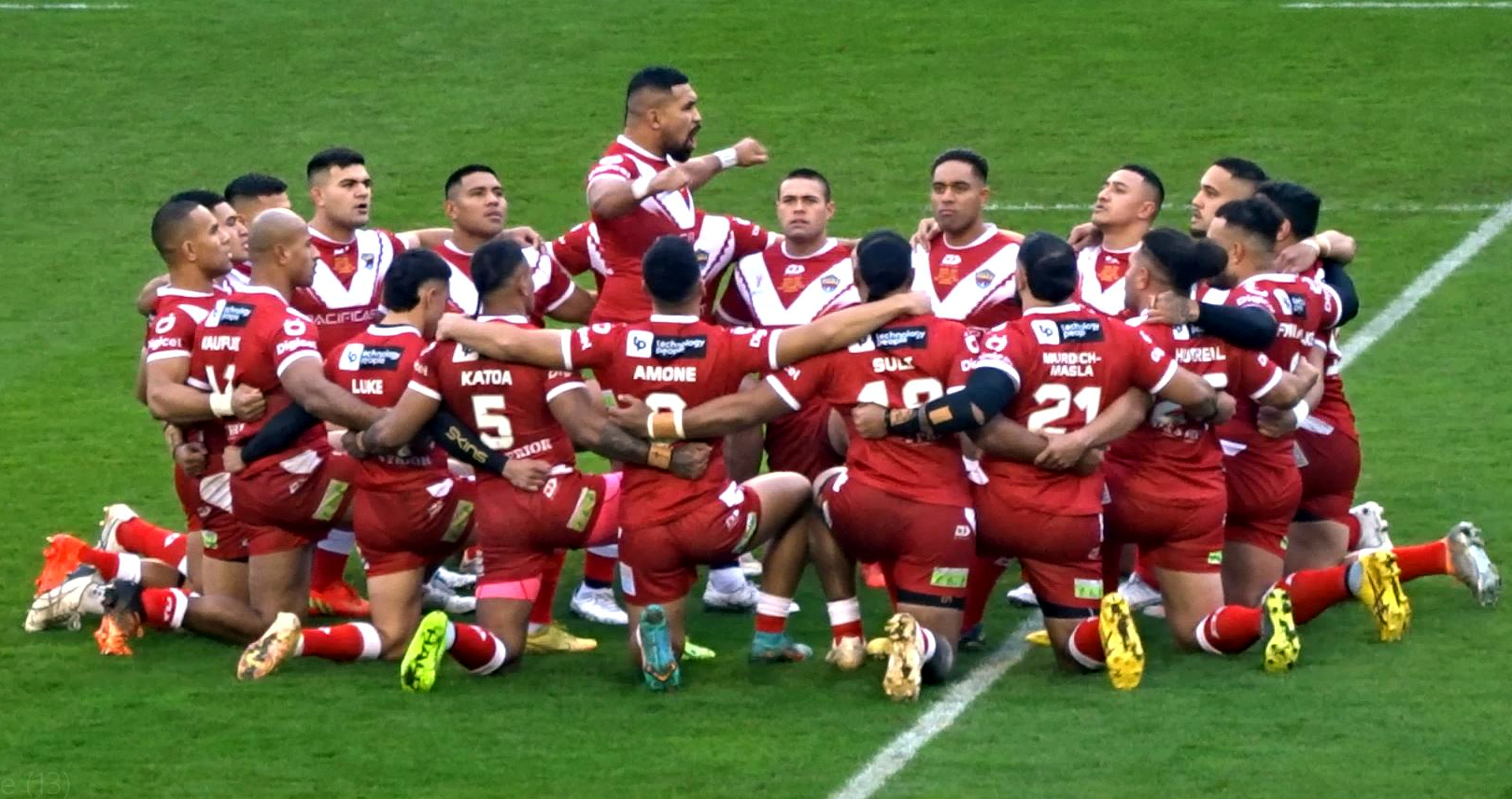
Tonga starting the Sipi Tau before a match during the 2021 Rugby League World Cup

The Tonga national rugby league team uses a different Sipi Tau.

Teu to ki he tupe!
Ko e 'aho!
Ko e 'aho mavava mo e tangi!
Teu mate maa Tonga!
Hi!

Tonga 'e!
Ta ke hu ki ai!
Katoa pe!
Taha!
Mo e to kotoa!
Teu fetau folau!

Hi! Ha!
Mo e pese!
Mo e lea!
'Otua ke tau!

Tau malohi!
'Ai Malohi!
Tau Fefeka!
'Ai Fefeka!

Tau ki Tonga!
To'o mo e hi!
Tau mo tangi!
'I 'olunga moihulo!
Feinga te tau 'ikuna!
'Ikuna kotoa!
Hi!

This Sipi Tau is translated as follows:

I will stomp the ground with a thunderous noise
The day
The day of clamor and howling
My life for Tonga
Yeah!

O Tonga
Behold, we make our entrance
All of us
As one
Stomping in unison
I will journey into battle

Hee! Haa!
In jubilation
In speech
O God, bless us that we may...

Fight well
Be strong
Fight hard
Be firm

Fight for Tonga
Take with you the "hee"!
Fight and howl
Towards the goal
We must be victorious
Victory all the way
Yeah!

== See also ==
- Haka of the All Blacks
- Cibi
- Siva tau
- Haka
- Hula
