= Toto (mythology) =

Character in Māori mythology

In Māori mythology, Toto was a chief in Hawaiki. He had two daughters, Kuramārōtini, the wife of Hoturapa, and Rongorongo, the wife of Turi. Toto felled a tree and made two canoes. One of these, the Aotea, was given to Turi, and was sailed by him to New Zealand. The other canoe, the Matahourua, was later commandeered by Kupe who sailed it to New Zealand with Kuramārōtini, Hoturapa's wife (Tregear 1891:527).
