= Polynesian =

Polynesian is the adjectival form of Polynesia. It may refer to:

- Polynesians, an ethnic group
- Polynesian culture, the culture of the indigenous peoples of Polynesia
- Polynesian mythology, the oral traditions of the people of Polynesia
- Polynesian languages, a language family spoken in geographical Polynesia and on a patchwork of outliers

== Other ==
- Polynesian (horse), an American Thoroughbred racehorse and sire
- Polynesian Leaders Group, an international governmental cooperation group
- Polynesian Triangle, a region of the Pacific Ocean with three island groups at its corners
- The Polynesian, a Honolulu-based newspaper published in the mid-nineteenth century
