= Rongorongo (mythology) =

Polynesian ancestress

- Born: 14th century? Polynesia
- Spouse: Turi
- Children: Tāneroroa
- Father: Toto

Rongorongo is an ancestress from Ra'iātea Island (Hawaiki) in Māori tradition, particularly of the Ngā Rauru, Ngāti Ruanui, Ngāruahine, Taranaki, and Whanganui iwi. She was the wife of Turi, the chief of the Aotea canoe which was given to Rongorongo as a present by her father Toto. After Rongorongo overheard Uenuku chanting incantations of Turi's murder, Turi and his people fled to New Zealand in the Aotea and arrived at the mouth of the Patea River.

In te reo, rongorongo holds meaning to the concepts of news, fame, and report; or it can be a verb (-hia, -na) to describe experiences such as hearing, smelling, and feeling.
