= Takelesi Lagaluga =

Niuean politician (1924–2009)

Takelesi (Douglas) Lagaluga JP
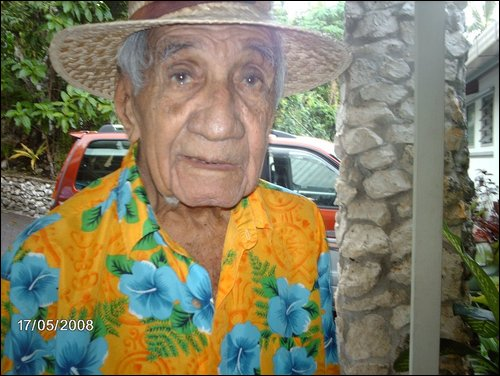
- Born: 10 June 1924; Avatele, Niue
- Died: 30 March 2009 (aged 84); Niue Foou Hospital, Niue
- Occupations: Administrator, Politician
- Spouse: Iola Lohana Douglas (née Ikimotu)

Takelesi (Douglas) Lagaluga. JP. (10 June 1924 – 30 March 2009) was a Niuean administrator, politician, and respected elder from the village of Avatele.

Lagaluga served the Government of Niue for 40 years, first as a Clerk to the Resident Commissioner then redeployed to the island's multi-functional Post Office (Bank & Telephone Exchange) rising to the position of Chief Postmaster in 1956.

Upon his appointment as Chief Postmaster, Lagaluga became the first native Niuean to lead a government department in the colonial administration. He retired in 1980 and served one term in Parliament as a Common Roll member.

Lagaluga was a keen and avid planter, hunter, and fisherman. He served in various capacities in the Village Council including as its Chairman for several terms and also served as the village Harbormaster for many years. He was a Deacon of Ekalesia Avatele (Congregational Presbyterian) for 43 years and Head Elder (Deputy Pastor) for 24 years retiring from this post in 2006 at the age of 82.

He was married to Iola Lohana Ikimotu (1924–1998) for 55 years and had 8 children.

Lagaluga received a state funeral and memorial services were held in New Zealand & Australia. The Premier of Niue, Hon. Toke Tufukia Talagi said of his death, "Another of our mighty ovava, a benevolent man, an extraordinary citizen and a respected tupuna, has fallen. We shall remember him in our hearts and in our prayers."

Takelesi Lagaluga is the son of Lagaluga and Tikatupe (née Hakeagaiki) of Anafonua & Liolau, Avatele.
