= Kuramārōtini =

Daughter of Toto, a chief of Hawaiki

In Māori mythology, Kuramārōtini was the daughter of Toto, a chief of Hawaiki. Toto made a gift to her of the canoe Matahourua, in which she went out fishing with her husband Hoturapa and their friend Kupe. Kupe tricked Hoturapa to dive into the water to free one of the lines. Once Hoturapa was overboard, Kupe set sail for New Zealand with Kuramārōtini (Tregear 1891:186).

In some stories, Kuramārōtini is the woman who first named New Zealand. It is said she exclaimed "He ao! He ao! He aotearoa!" (A cloud! A cloud! A long white cloud!) coining the Māori name for New Zealand, Aotearoa.
