= Ngati Haua =

Ngati Haua may refer to:

- Ngāti Hāua, a tribe of the upper Whanganui River, New Zealand
- Ngāti Hauā, a tribe of the Waikato, New Zealand
- Ngāti Haua, a subtribe of Ngāruahine, of Taranaki, New Zealand
- Ngāti Haua, a subtribe of Te Rarawa, of Northland, New Zealand
