= Te Manihera Te Ikahaehae =

Te Manihera Te Ikahaehae was a Māori Anglican Lay-preacher from the Ngāti Maru of Taranaki iwi. He converted to Anglicanism in the 1850s. He was responsible for bringing the Bell of Purangi from Whanganui to Taranaki.

Prior to his conversion, his name was simply Te Ikahaehae. Te Manihera was a post baptismal name given to him in remembrance of CMS clergy, Rev. Maunsell. Later in life, he was known to have reverted to his original name Te Ikahaehae or shortened to Te Ika. His descendants used Teika as their surname.

There was an earlier "Te Manihera". His pre-baptism name was Poutama - a chief of the Tangahoe hapu of Ngati Ruanui. This earlier "Te Manihera" was killed in Taupo in March 1847 and was subsequently martyred. He was however, a man quite distinct from Te Manihera Te Ikahaehae. Te Manihera Te Ikahaehae converted to Anglicanism in Whanganui in the 1850s.

Te Ikahaehae was listed in schedule 1 of the Purangi Landless Natives Act 1907 as having received land under this legislation. His nephew, Tutanuku Tume, one of the leading men of Purangi was also listed.
