= Ratapiko =

Settlement in Taranaki Region, New Zealand

- Rural community
- Interactive map of Ratapiko
- Coordinates: 39°11′59″S 174°19′18″E
- Country: New Zealand
- Region: Taranaki
- Territorial authority: New Plymouth District
- Ward: Kōhanga Moa General Ward; Te Purutanga Mauri Pūmanawa Māori Ward
- Community: Inglewood Community
- Electorates: Taranaki-King Country; Te Tai Hauāuru (Māori)

Government
  - Territorial Authority: New Plymouth District Council
  - Regional council: Taranaki Regional Council
  - Mayor of New Plymouth: Max Brough
  - Taranaki-King Country MP: Barbara Kuriger
  - Te Tai Hauāuru MP: Debbie Ngarewa-Packer

Area
  - Total: 166.82 km^{2} (64.41 sq mi)

Population (2023 Census)
  - Total: 390
  - Density: 2.3/km^{2} (6.1/sq mi)

Ratapiko is a locality in Taranaki, New Zealand. Kaimata is about six kilometres to the north-west.

Lake Ratapiko is just to the south-east of the locality.

== Demographics ==
Ratapiko locality covers 166.82 km^{2} (64.41 sq mi). The locality is part of the Tarata statistical area.

Historical population for Ratapiko
Year	Pop.	±% p.a.
2006	399	—
2013	339	−2.30%
2018	354	+0.87%
2023	390	+1.96%

Ratapiko had a population of 390 in the 2023 New Zealand census, an increase of 36 people (10.2%) since the 2018 census, and an increase of 51 people (15.0%) since the 2013 census. There were 207 males and 183 females in 138 dwellings. 2.3% of people identified as LGBTIQ+. There were 90 people (23.1%) aged under 15 years, 51 (13.1%) aged 15 to 29, 198 (50.8%) aged 30 to 64, and 51 (13.1%) aged 65 or older.

People could identify as more than one ethnicity. The results were 96.2% European (Pākehā); 12.3% Māori; 2.3% Pasifika; 2.3% Asian; 1.5% Middle Eastern, Latin American and African New Zealanders (MELAA); and 3.1% other, which includes people giving their ethnicity as "New Zealander". English was spoken by 96.2%, Samoan by 0.8%, and other languages by 3.8%. No language could be spoken by 3.1% (e.g. too young to talk). The percentage of people born overseas was 9.2, compared with 28.8% nationally.

Religious affiliations were 28.5% Christian, 1.5% Hindu, and 0.8% other religions. People who answered that they had no religion were 60.0%, and 8.5% of people did not answer the census question.

Of those at least 15 years old, 48 (16.0%) people had a bachelor's or higher degree, 171 (57.0%) had a post-high school certificate or diploma, and 87 (29.0%) people exclusively held high school qualifications. 33 people (11.0%) earned over $100,000 compared to 12.1% nationally. The employment status of those at least 15 was 183 (61.0%) full-time, 48 (16.0%) part-time, and 12 (4.0%) unemployed.

=== Tarata statistical area ===
Tarata statistical area, which also includes Purangi, covers 258.96 km^{2} (99.99 sq mi) and had an estimated population of 640 as of June 2025, with a population density of 2.5 people per km^{2}.

Historical population for Tarata statistical area
Year	Pop.	±% p.a.
2006	606	—
2013	582	−0.58%
2018	570	−0.42%
2023	600	+1.03%

Tarata had a population of 600 in the 2023 New Zealand census, an increase of 30 people (5.3%) since the 2018 census, and an increase of 18 people (3.1%) since the 2013 census. There were 318 males and 282 females in 222 dwellings. 1.5% of people identified as LGBTIQ+. The median age was 40.3 years (compared with 38.1 years nationally). There were 138 people (23.0%) aged under 15 years, 78 (13.0%) aged 15 to 29, 309 (51.5%) aged 30 to 64, and 75 (12.5%) aged 65 or older.

People could identify as more than one ethnicity. The results were 95.5% European (Pākehā); 13.5% Māori; 1.5% Pasifika; 1.0% Asian; 1.0% Middle Eastern, Latin American and African New Zealanders (MELAA); and 3.0% other, which includes people giving their ethnicity as "New Zealander". English was spoken by 98.0%, Māori by 1.0%, Samoan by 0.5%, and other languages by 3.0%. No language could be spoken by 2.0% (e.g. too young to talk). The percentage of people born overseas was 10.0, compared with 28.8% nationally.

Religious affiliations were 29.5% Christian, 1.0% Hindu, and 1.0% other religions. People who answered that they had no religion were 59.0%, and 10.0% of people did not answer the census question.

Of those at least 15 years old, 60 (13.0%) people had a bachelor's or higher degree, 288 (62.3%) had a post-high school certificate or diploma, and 108 (23.4%) people exclusively held high school qualifications. The median income was $43,600, compared with $41,500 nationally. 54 people (11.7%) earned over $100,000 compared to 12.1% nationally. The employment status of those at least 15 was 279 (60.4%) full-time, 75 (16.2%) part-time, and 18 (3.9%) unemployed.

== Marae ==
Te Upoko o te Whenua Marae and Ngārongo meeting house are a meeting place for Ngāti Maru.

In October 2020, the Government committed $500,000 from the Provincial Growth Fund to upgrade the marae, creating 15 jobs.

== Education ==
Ratapiko School is a coeducational full primary (years 1–8) school with a roll of 24 students as of July 2026. It opened in 1888. The school was accepted as an Enviroschool in 2017.
