= Ohomairangi =

Important ancestor in Māori mythology

In Māori mythology, Ohomairangi is an ancestor who lived in Hawaiki six generations before the migration to Aotearoa (New Zealand). He was the guardian of Taputapuatea marae in Rangiātea (Raʻiātea), considered the most sacred site in Polynesia.

Ohomairangi is said to be the son of Kuraimonoa, a mortal woman, and the celestial being Pūhaorangi. He was the father of the high priest and navigator, Muturangi, who contended with Kupe. By the time of Ohomairangi's great-grandson Atuamatua, his descendants were known as Ngāti Ohomairangi or Nga Ohomairangi. They had influence at Aitutaki, Raʻiātea, and surrounding islands.

Eventually two divisions of the tribe built the Te Arawa and Tainui waka, respectively, which participated in the migration to New Zealand. Ohomairangi is considered the major ancestor of the people who migrated on the two waka, including Tama-te-kapua.
