= Kupe =

Māori semi-legendary explorer

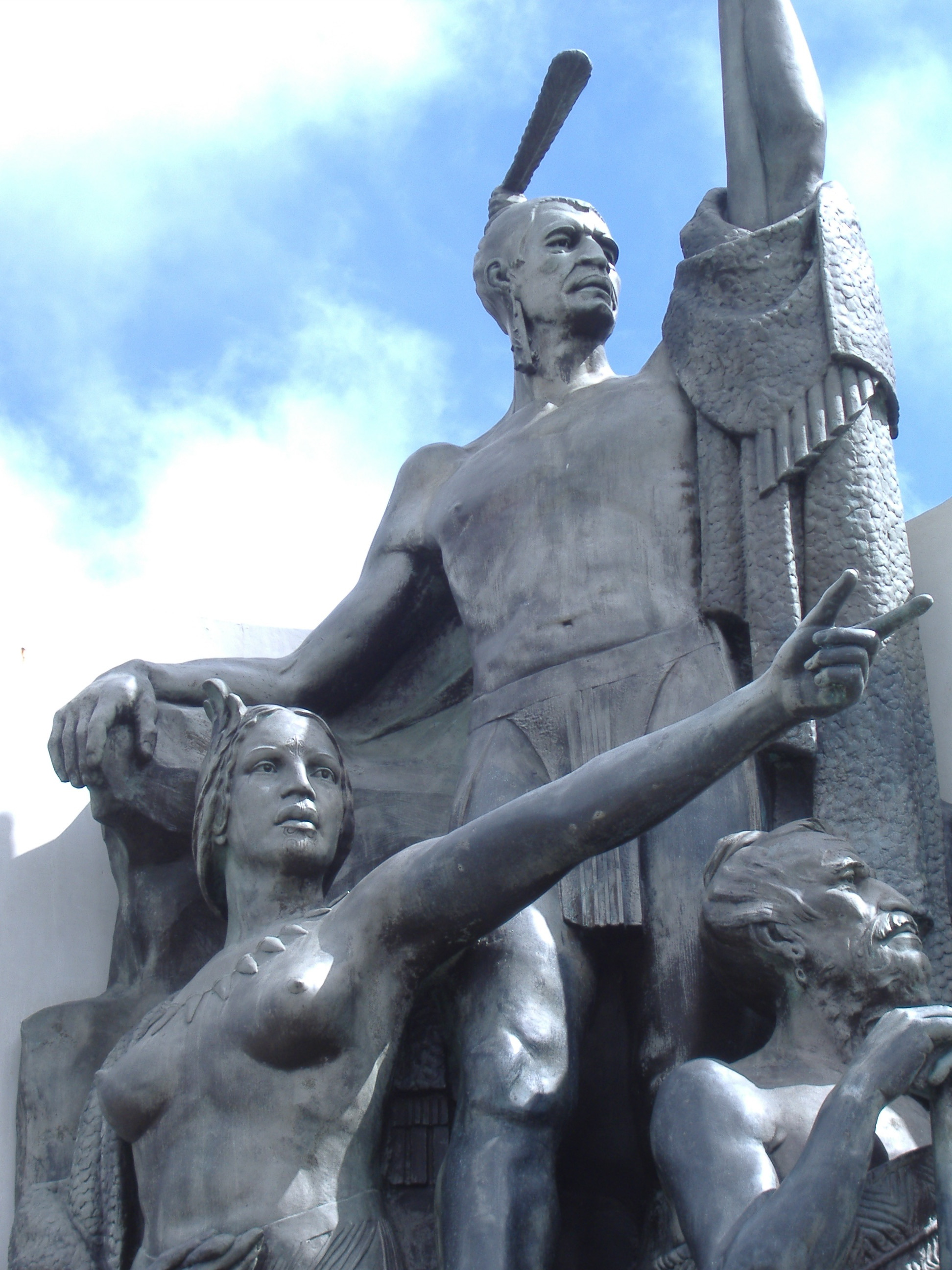
Detail of Kupe and his wife Kūrāmarotini from the statue on the Wellington waterfront

Kupe was a Polynesian explorer who, according to Māori history, was the first person to discover New Zealand. He is generally held to have been born to a father from Rarotonga and a mother from Raʻiātea, and probably spoke a Māori proto-language similar to Cook Islands Māori or Tahitian. His voyage to New Zealand ensured that the land was known to the Polynesians, and he would therefore be responsible for the genesis of the Māori people.

Kupe was born in the geographically uncertain Māori homeland of Hawaiki, to a father from Rarotonga and a mother from Raʻiātea, between 40 and 23 generations ago. The more specific reasons for Kupe's semi-legendary journey, and the migration of Māori in general, have been contested. Māori oral history recounts that Hawaiki and other Polynesian islands were experiencing considerable internal conflict during his time, which is thought to have possibly caused an exodus.

Kupe features prominently in the mythology and oral history of some Māori iwi (tribes), but the details of his life differ between iwi. Various legends and histories describe Kupe's extensive involvement in the settlement of New Zealand, around 1200–1350 CE, with many talking of his achievements, such as the hunting and destruction of the great octopus, Te Wheke-a-Muturangi.

== Voyage to New Zealand ==
The historical Kupe is thought to have been born in the uncertain Māori homeland of Hawaiki, to a father from Rarotonga and a mother from Raʻiātea. At the time of his journey, he lived in the settlement of Hawaiki-rangi. He was well educated in Polynesian navigation, and likely spoke the hypothetical proto-Māori language, which would have been most similar to Cook Islands Māori or Tahitian. There are many different accounts of Kupe's first voyage to New Zealand that range from tribe to tribe, but most follow a similar basic story. Most histories claim that in a time approximately 40 generations ago (between 900 and 1200 AD), Kupe, his wife Kuramārōtini, the great warrior Ngahue, and a relatively large crew, boarded Kuramārōtini's canoe Matahourua (or in some dialects Matawhaorua). According to the Waitangi Tribunal's Wai 262 report, Matawhaorua was a classical Polynesian open-ocean catamaran, capable of carrying a complement of 25 people under sail or paddle, fully provisioned. It is said that at first Kupe had some difficulty filling the waka, with only a few members from Hawaiki-rangi with him. The report states he eventually found the remaining crew at Pikopikoiwhiti, a nearby village "renowned for its ready supply of adventurers". Seven more were added from there. Some oral histories say he travelled with a second catamaran, Tāwhirirangi, under the stewardship of the navigator Te Ngake.

Matawhaorua set sail for lands further to the south in pursuit of the great octopus of his rival, Muturangi. Matawhaorua is thought to have journeyed towards Te Tai Tokerau. As the waka neared land for the first time, Kuramārōtini saw a thick layer of cloud on the horizon. She is then believed to have exclaimed "He ao! He ao! He ao tea roa!" meaning, ‘A cloud! A cloud! A long white cloud!’. Recognising a large cloud as a symbol of land, Kupe led the waka towards the land, where it is believed his party made their first landing at the Hokianga Harbour. From here, Kupe and Kuramārōtini continued his voyage around the country. He sailed down the coast of the Wairarapa and landed in Wellington Harbour, staying there for some time and naming the islands of Matiu (Somes Island) and Mākaro (Ward Island) after his daughters. A legend says that Kupe then continued his pursuit of Muturangi's octopus, eventually destroying it with a blow to its head after a fierce battle in the Cook Strait. In some versions of the story he travelled as far south as Arahura on the South Island's West Coast, and also to the Coromandel Peninsula.

The Waitangi Tribunal claims that Kupe and his crew remained in New Zealand for as many as 20 years before deciding to return home. Kupe sailed back via Hokianga Harbour, where he sacrificed his son Tuputupu-whenua, drowning him in the spring of Te Puna-o-te-ao-Mārama to guard the land from under the water while he was gone. According to oral history, Kupe believed sacrificing his son would ensure the mauri (life essence) of his whakapapa (descent line) would remain in Aotearoa permanently, even though he would be gone. He then said a karakia, vowing never to return before leaving for Hawaiki. The full name of the harbour is Te Hokianga-nui-a-Kupe; "the place of Kupe's great return".

Hei konei rā, e Te Puna-o-te-ao-mārama, ka hokianga nui ake nei tēnei, e kore anō e hokianga nui mai.

— Kupe, Te Puna-o-te-ao-mārama, Te Tai Tokerau, c.1000 CE

Roughly thirty years later, Matawhaorua was thoroughly renovated and refitted under the leadership of Nukutawhiti, Kupe's grandson. The canoe was renamed Ngātokimatawhaorua, which translates literally to "the re-adzed Matawhaorua". Nukutawhiti had memorised his grandfather's navigational instructions for reaching Aotearoa, knowing by heart the star path to follow to get there. Under his stewardship, the journey was no longer burdened with undue risk and ignorance of the geography of lands further south. This time Nukutawhiti travelled for the express purpose of settling Aotearoa, so he thoroughly extended Ngātokimatawhaorua to take more passengers.

Kupe also gave the names to Arapāoa, Mana, Kohukohu, Pouahi, Maungataniwha. These names have been preserved by generations of Māori people settling the regions. While some of the names from other ancestors have fallen out of use, those associated with Kupe seem to have endured.

== Time of arrival ==
Estimates of when Kupe discovered New Zealand vary.

Date	Claimant	Notes	Ref
Never	Margaret Orbell (1985)	View of Kupe as entirely mythical.	
925 CE	Percy Smith (1913–15)	Attacked by Simmons (1976) as "the great New Zealand myth". Tom Brooking (2005) says that this date "seems too early" and says that historians by 2005 favour 1180 CE.	
950 CE	Pei Te Hurinui Jones (1944)	Bruce Biggs (1995) states that "the genealogical evidence for this date is questionable".	
1180 CE	Tom Brooking (2005)	Claimed consensus by Tom Brooking.	
Before 1314 ± 6 CE	Various authors (2014)	A 2014 study concluded that no permanent settlement took place in New Zealand prior to the Kaharoa eruption of Mount Tarawera (1314 ±6 CE), but stated that "A brief period of pre-settlement activity that represents discovery of New Zealand by Polynesians and a reconnaissance of the main islands is allowed in this model".	
mid-14th century	David Abulafia (2019)	Claimed consensus of "more modern research" by David Abulafia (2019), with Kupe accompanying the initial settlers in the mid-14th century.	

== Contention ==
There is contention concerning the status of Kupe. The contention turns on the authenticity of later versions of the legends, the so-called 'orthodox' versions closely associated with S. Percy Smith and Hoani Te Whatahoro Jury. Unlike the attested tribal traditions about Kupe recorded before Smith and Jury, the orthodox version is precise in terms of dates and in offering place names in Polynesia where Kupe is supposed to have lived or departed from. The orthodox version also places Kupe hundreds of years before the arrival of the other founding canoes, whereas in the earlier traditions, Kupe is most definitely contemporary with those canoes. In addition, according to legends of the Whanganui and Taranaki regions Kupe was a contemporary of Turi of the Aotea canoe. In other traditions, Kupe arrived around the year 1400 on other canoes, including Tainui and Tākitimu.

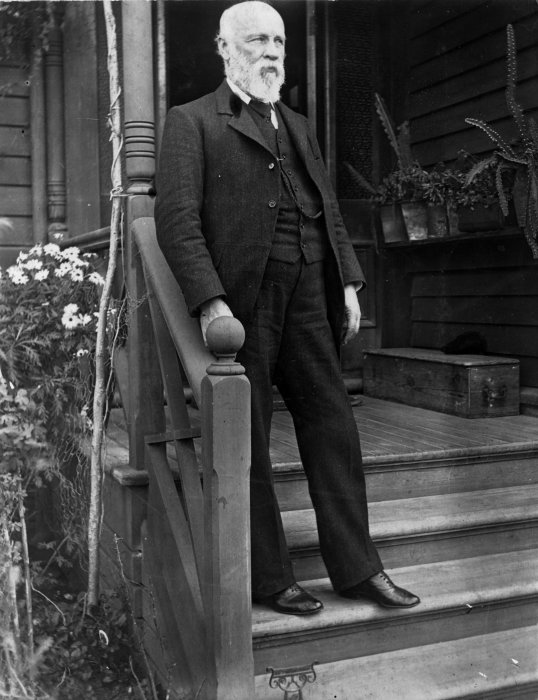
Stephenson Percy Smith, 1905

In the "orthodox" version, Kupe was a great chief of Hawaiki who arrived in New Zealand in 925 CE. He left his cousin Hoturapa to drown during a fishing expedition and kidnapped his wife, Kūrāmarotini, with whom he fled in her great canoe Matahourua. During their subsequent journeys, they overcame numerous monsters and sea demons, including the great octopus named as Te Wheke-a-Muturangi, and discovered New Zealand. Returning to Hawaiki, Kupe told of his adventures and persuaded others to migrate with him (Craig 1989:127; see also External links below).

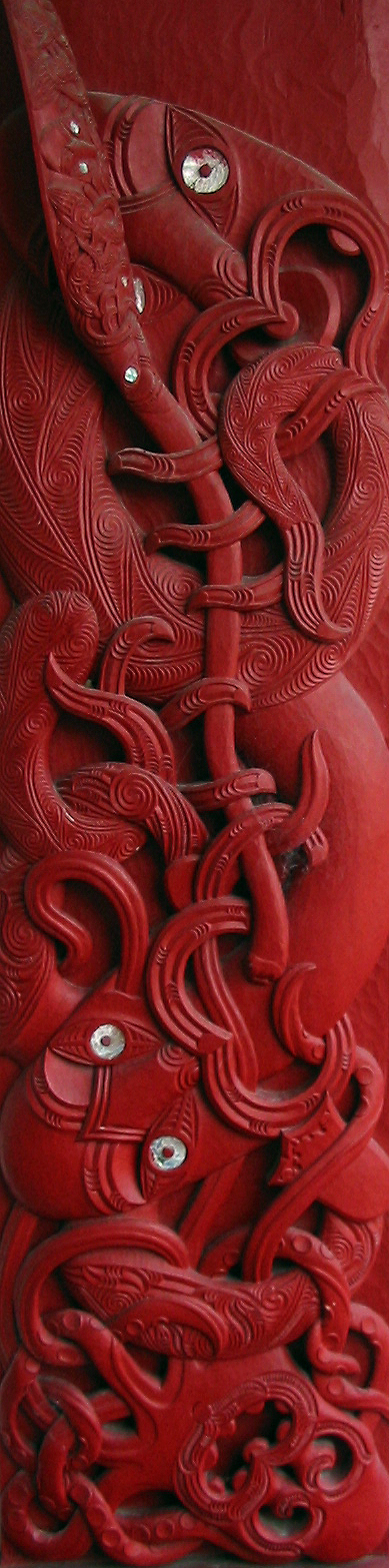
House carving showing Kupe (holding a paddle), with two sea creatures at his feet

David Simmons said that

A search for the sources of what I now call 'The Great New Zealand Myth' of Kupe, Toi and the Fleet, had surprising results. In this form they did not exist in the old manuscripts nor in the whaikorero of learned men. Bits and pieces there were. Kupe was and is known, in the traditions of the Hokianga, Waikato, East Coast and South Island: but the genealogies given did not tally with those given by S. Percy Smith. The stories given by Smith were a mixture of differing tribal tradition. In other words the whole tradition as given by Smith was pakeha, not Maori. Similarly, the story of Toi and Whatonga and the canoe race leading to settlement in New Zealand could not be authenticated except from the one man who gave it to Percy Smith. Learned men of the same tribe make no mention of this story and there are no waiata celebrating their deeds. Tribal origin canoes are well known to the tribes belonging to them: but none of them talk as Smith did of six large sea-going canoes setting out together from Raʻiātea. The Great New Zealand Myth was just that. (Simmons 1977).

== Attested local traditions ==
Traditions about Kupe appear among the peoples of the following areas: Northland, Ngāti Kahungunu, Tainui, Whanganui-Taranaki, Rangitāne, and the South Island.

=== Northland ===
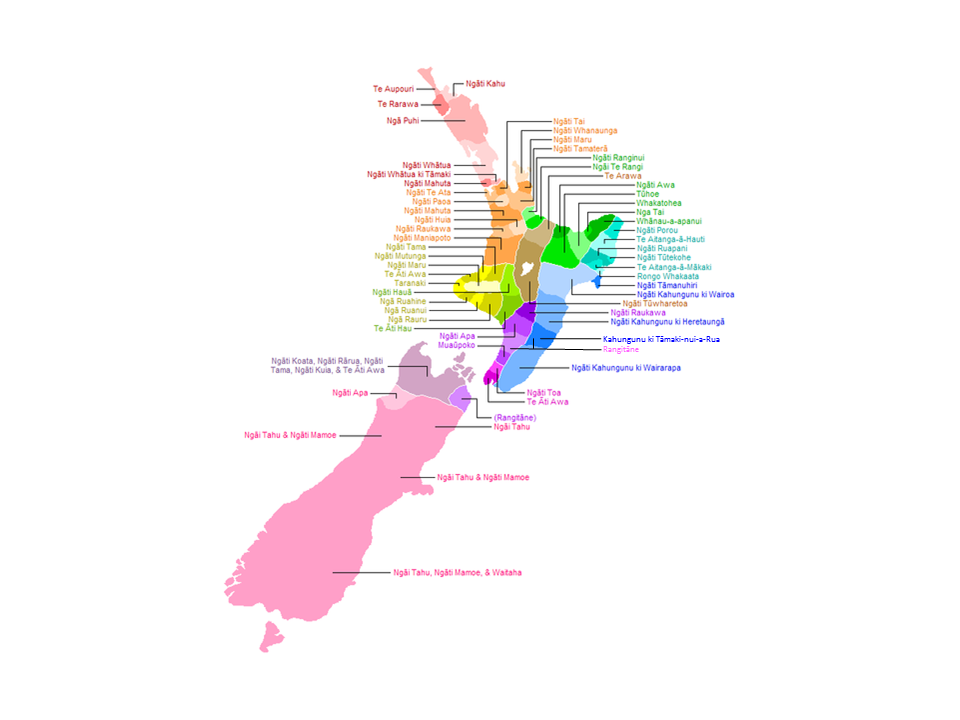
Māori tribal districts

In the Northland traditions, Kupe is a discoverer and contemporary with, but older than, Nukutawhiti, the ancestor of the Ngā Puhi people. Kupe arrives, lives at Hokianga, and returns to Wawauatea, his homeland, leaving certain signs and marks of his visit.

- A reference to Kupe occurs in a version of the legend of Māui fishing up the North Island, recorded in 1841 by Catherin Servant, a Marist missionary. Māui's hook, made from the jawbone of his eldest son, catches in the gable of the house of Nukutawhiti, Kupe's wife. Kupe was involved in the formation of New Zealand (from Māui's fish).
- In 1849 Āperahama Taonui of Ngā Puhi wrote that 'Kupe came to this land in olden times' to look for Tuputupuwhenua. 'He went to all places on this island. He did not see Tuputupuwhenua on this land. Hokianga was seen, a returning of Kupe, that is (the meaning of) Hokianga. Under the earth are his and Kui's dwelling’. The land was uninhabited (deserted). Āperahama adds a genealogy from Kupe to Nukutawhiti, the ancestor of the Ngā Puhi. Nukutawhiti came ‘from overseas’ with his brother-in-law Ruanui in their canoe named Māmari. They met Kupe at sea, who told Nukutawhiti that Tuputupuwhenua was at Hokianga. When Nukutawhiti arrived at the mouth of the harbour, Tuputupuwhenua disappeared underground.
- Hoani Timo wrote a manuscript in 1855 in which 'Kupe came in former times – he was the husband of Peketahi; they crossed over from the other side' (of the sea). They lost a child, Totoko, at sea. When they arrived they had more children - Māui-mua, Māui-taha, and Māui-tikitiki-a-Taranga. Rāhiri, an important ancestor of Ngā Puhi, descends from these children
- A tradition collected before 1855 from an unknown author names Kupe's home island as Wawauatea. Kupe came and visited every part of this island. He lived at Hokianga until he returned home. He left several things behind, including his canoe bailer, and two of his pets at the mouth of the Hokianga harbour: Āraiteuru (male) and Nuia (female). On his return to Wawauatea he informed the men of the village that there was a good land to the south. Canoes were made, of which Matawhaorua, belonging to Ngā Puhi, landed at Hokianga. Other canoes are mentioned with details of their sailings.

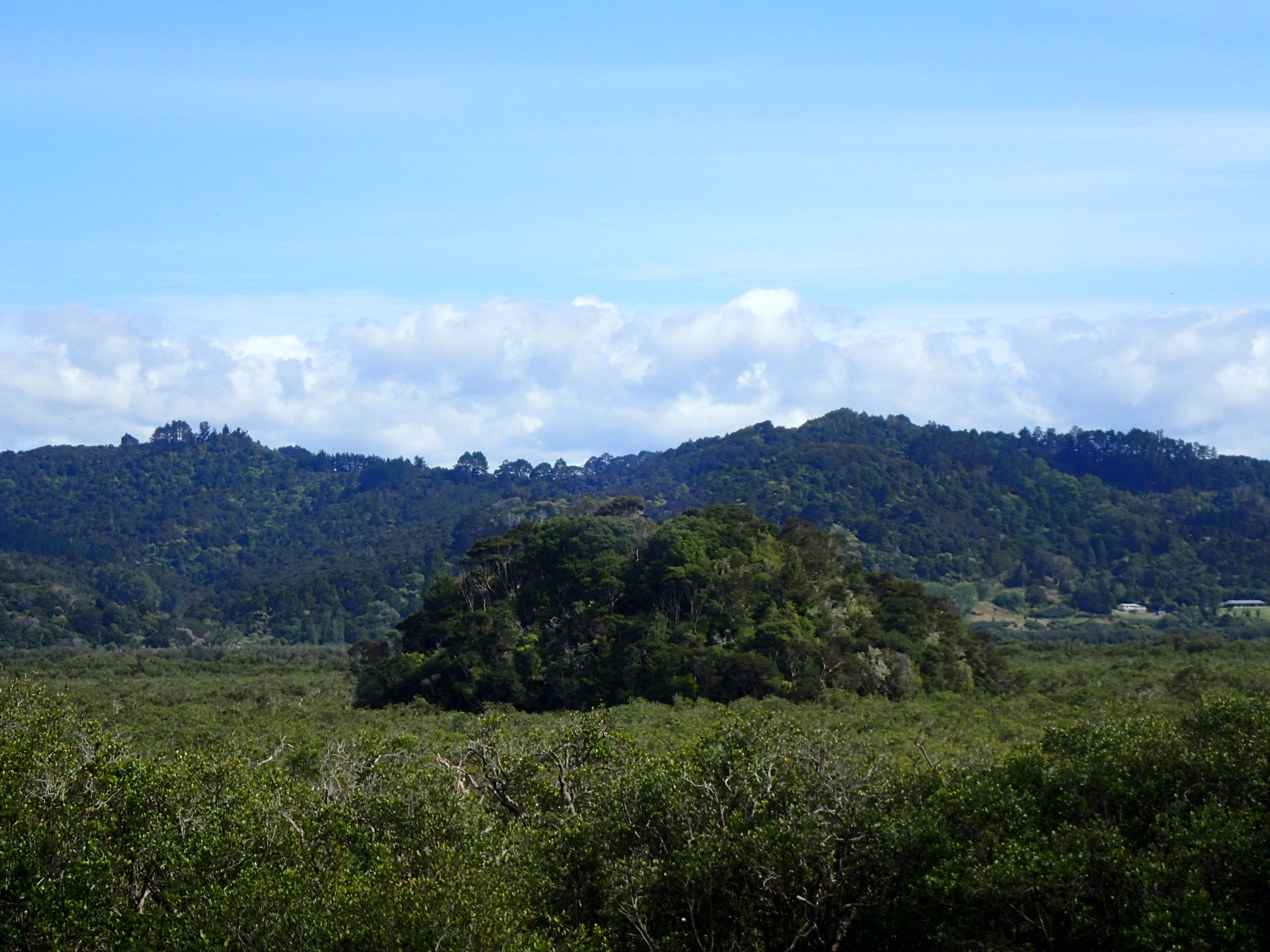
Motukiore Island - where Kupe placed the Kiore on his arrival

- Simmons had access to a privately held manuscript from the Hokianga area which says that there were three Kupe in Hawaiki: Kupe Nuku, Kupe Rangi, and Kupu Manawa. Kupe Nuku came to this island in the Matawhaorua canoe, with his wife, two slaves, and nine others, with their wives. They took three days and nights to paddle to this island, Aotearoa. Kupe sailed around the whole island and saw no people. He left signs along the coast to show that they were the first to live there. At Hokianga he left the posts of his net and his earth oven, the footprints of his slave, and the bailer of his canoe. At Opara, he left his dog. When fish were baked in an oven, Kupe grew angry when the oven was opened and they were not cooked. He cursed his companions, sending the birds and lizards and insects into the forest to live, the spirit folk to the mountains, and the echo to the cliffs where he would be condemned to utter short speeches as he had done as his friends neglected the oven. Kupe returned to Hawaiki, but war broke out because of Tama-te-kapua. As a result, Kupe's grandson Nukutawhiti leaves Hawaiki and lands in Hokianga.

=== Ngāti Kahungunu ===
Early accounts from the Ngāti Kahungunu area consistently place Kupe on board the Tākitimu canoe or name as his companions people who are strongly associated with the Tākitimu. No other canoes are mentioned in connection with him. They also contain no references to the octopus of Muturangi, nor of the chase from Hawaiki.

- In a manuscript written by Hami Ropiha in 1862, Tamatea came on the Tākitimu canoe, along with his elders, the children of Tato, who were Rongokako, Hikitapuae, Hikitaketake, Rongoiamoa, Taihopia, Kahutuanui, Mataro, Te Angi, Kupe, Ngake, Paikea, and Uenuku. They came to ‘this island’ for two reasons: a fight about a woman, and a dispute over the planting of crops. At Tauranga, the group divided in three. Tamatea and his son Kahungunu stayed to make a fishing net, others went north, but Kupe and Ngake sailed to the south in Tākitimu. At Wairoaiti, the family had been sent inland to weave flax fibre for the canoe. When they returned, the canoe was gone. They climbed a hill and saw the canoe sailing away. Kupe arrived at Tawake. He sent his daughter Mokototuarangi to fetch water. When she was returning, Kupe's canoe sailed off and the daughter was left standing there, angry.

He then travelled south to reach Māhia.

=== Tainui ===
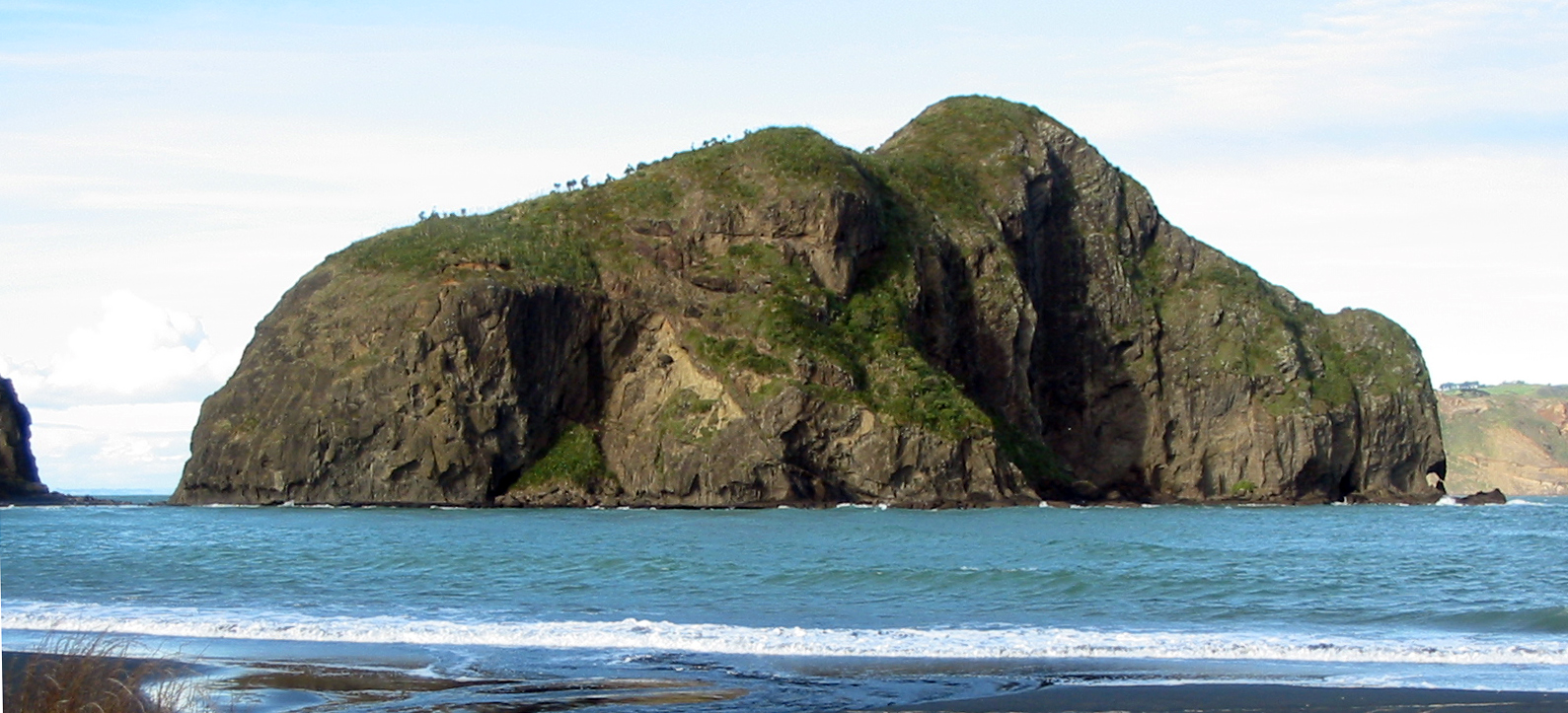
Paratutae Island, with the indentations said to have been left in the cliff-face by Kupe's paddle

Tainui traditions about Kupe can be summarised as: Kupe stole Hoturapa's wife or wives; came to New Zealand and cut up the land; raised rough seas; and went away again. The sources in detail:

- In a South Manukau tradition dated to 1842, Kupe came with his grandfather, Maru-tawiti, and his brother-in-law Hoturapa and several others. They came to survey the land and return again. Nothing is known of the land from which they sailed. Kupe is said to have stranded his brother-in-law at East Cape, stealing away with his wives. He sailed around North Cape. Kupe raised a rough sea on the western coast to prevent Hoturapa from following him, and that is why the west coast is always rougher than the east coast. At the Manukau Heads he struck Paratutae Island with his paddle, leaving an imprint which is visible to this day. The journey ended at Kāwhia. Little more is known of Kupe; perhaps he returned to the land from which he came. It is said that some of his people remained.
- A tradition of the Ngāti Te Ata tribe, also dated 1842, and also from the South Manukau area, places Kupe on board the Tainui canoe.
- A song collected from the Ngāti Toa war leader Te Rauparaha in 1847 refers to Kupe as the ‘man who sliced up the land; Kapiti stands away, Mana stands away, Arapaoa stands separated. These are the signs of my ancestor, of Kupe, who explored Titapua’.
- A version showing some influence from printed sources was collected before 1907 from Wirihana Aoterangi of the Ngāti Tahinga tribe of Raglan. Kupe and his companion Turi arrive on a canoe named Aotearoa. They find the inhabitants of this island to be ‘goblins’ or ‘fairies’ of various kinds, the descendants of the companions of Māui when he fished up this island. Kupe left his daughter at Rangitoto. Near Whanganui-a-tara (Wellington Harbour) he regretted this, and cut his flesh. The blood gushed forth and to this day the cliffs and sea creatures of that area are red. At Aotea Harbour he discovered the inhabitants, the Ngāti Matakore, digging up fern-root. Kupe decided to return to Hawaiki, and told his slave Powhetengu to stay and look after this island. The slave, terrified of the people of this land, did not agree to this. When he left, Kupe threw his belt into the sea, to make it rough and prevent the slave from following him. Powhetengu made a canoe and tried to follow, but the rough seas overturned it and it turned into a rock in Aotea Harbour. Kupe sailed to Hawaiki, announcing that he had found a large land, and that its people were like ‘goblins’.

=== Whanganui-Taranaki ===
Whanganui-Taranaki traditions can be summarised as: Kupe came looking for his wife who had been abducted by (H)oturapa. His canoe was named Mataho(u)rua; Kupe was associated with Turi as his contemporary. Kupe cut up the land, and he was a brother of Ngake. Kupe encountered rough seas on his journey. The octopus story is known, but the creature is not named. Except in later versions which are somewhat suspect as to their authenticity, the accounts do not include the episode in which Kupe chases the octopus from Hawaiki. Here are some of the accounts from this area:

- A tradition written by Te Hukahuka on 25 October 1847 states that Kupe found no people on this island when he came. He returned and met Turi, and told him that all he had seen was 'a flock of spirits' (apu aparoa), and two birds: a fantail and a kōkako. Turi said let us go back there and Kupe said 'Kupe returns' and returned to Hawaiki.
- In a tradition collected from Wiremu Tīpene Pōkaiatua of Manawapou in 1854, Kupe arrived at Wellington Harbour aboard the Mata’orua (Matawhaorua), looking for his wife Kūrāmarotini who had been abducted by his younger brother ‘Oturapa (Hoturapa). He could not find him, and returned, erecting a post at Pātea as a token of his visit. Kupe brought the karaka tree, and also divided off the North Island, which had been attached to Hawaiki until then.
- In a legend from a manuscript by Piri Kawau of Āti Awa and dated approximately 1854 the canoe Matahorua (Matawhaorua) is the canoe that sailed ‘the great distance’ and was commanded by Reti. Kupe killed Hoturapa and took his wife Kūrāmarotini. Then they came to New Zealand. Kupe cut up the land, and saw two inhabitants, Kōkako and Tīwaiwaka (Blue-wattled crow and Fantail). Then he returned to Hawaiki, and gave Turi directions for sailing to New Zealand.
- Whanganui chief Hoani Wiremu Hīpango gave a version to Rev. Richard Taylor in 1859. In this version, when Kupe came to New Zealand he found the land flowing. He made it lie quietly, and when Turi arrived, he found it floating.
- In October 1882 Rerete Tapo of Parikino said "Now listen, the first to come to this island was Kupe to fold and separate the great fish of Māui".

=== Rangitāne ===
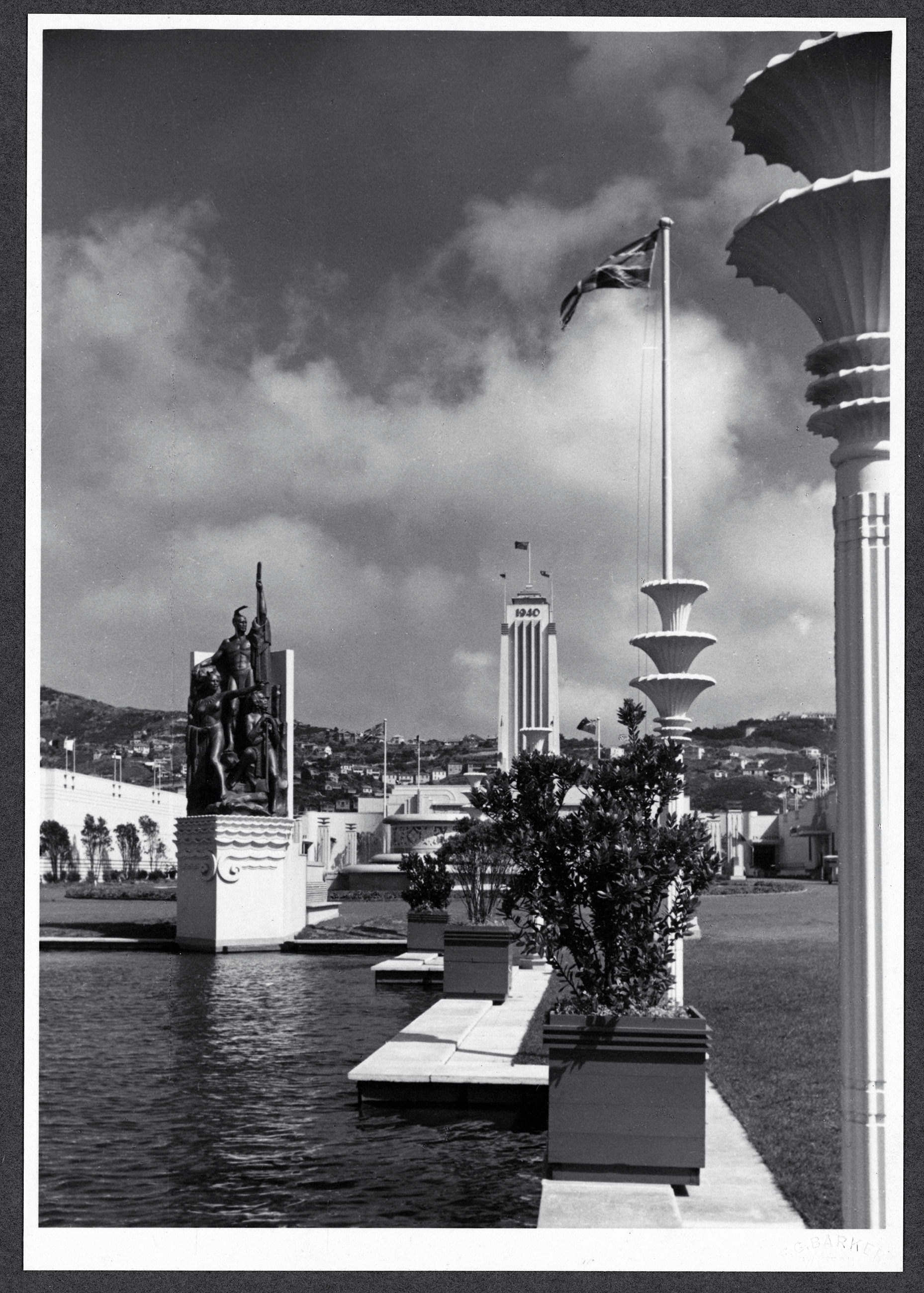
Kupe Statue at the Centennial Exhibition (1939–1940)

- An 1893 account by Te Whetū of Ngāti Raukawa, who was familiar with Rangitāne traditions, tells of Kupe with his daughters and two birds, Rupe (pigeon) and Kawauatoru (cormorant or shag), exploring the west coast of the North Island. Kupe sends the cormorant to rest the current in the Manukau harbour, which the bird reports as weak, and in Cook Strait, which the bird reports as too strong. The pigeon is sent to explore the interior of the island, and encounters a fantail and a crow (kōkako). Kupe stays at Wellington harbour and names two islands Matiu and Makoro after his daughters. On his return journey, Kupe meets Turi at an island and tells him of this island. At Hawaiki. Kupe recounts his adventures.

=== South Island ===
The few references to Kupe in South Island sources indicate that the traditions are substantially the same as those of Ngāti Kahungunu, with whom Ngāi Tahu, the main tribe of the South Island, had strong genealogical and trading links.

- In one tradition Tamatea of the Tākitimu canoe, having been deserted by his three wives, sails around New Zealand looking for them, and shares with Kupe the honour of naming parts of the land.
- White records a legend in which the Rangitāne chief Te Hau has his cultivations at Te Karaka ruined by Kupe who pours salt over them.

=== Unlocated ===
"When Kupe, the first discoverer of New Zealand, first came in sight of the land, his wife cried, 'He ao! He ao!" (a cloud! a cloud!). Great Barrier Island was therefore named Aotea (white cloud), and the long mainland Aotearoa (long white cloud). When Kupe finally returned to his homeland his people asked him why he did not call the newly discovered country after his fatherland. He replied, 'I preferred the warm breast to the cold one, the new land to the old land long forsaken'."

== Modern depictions ==
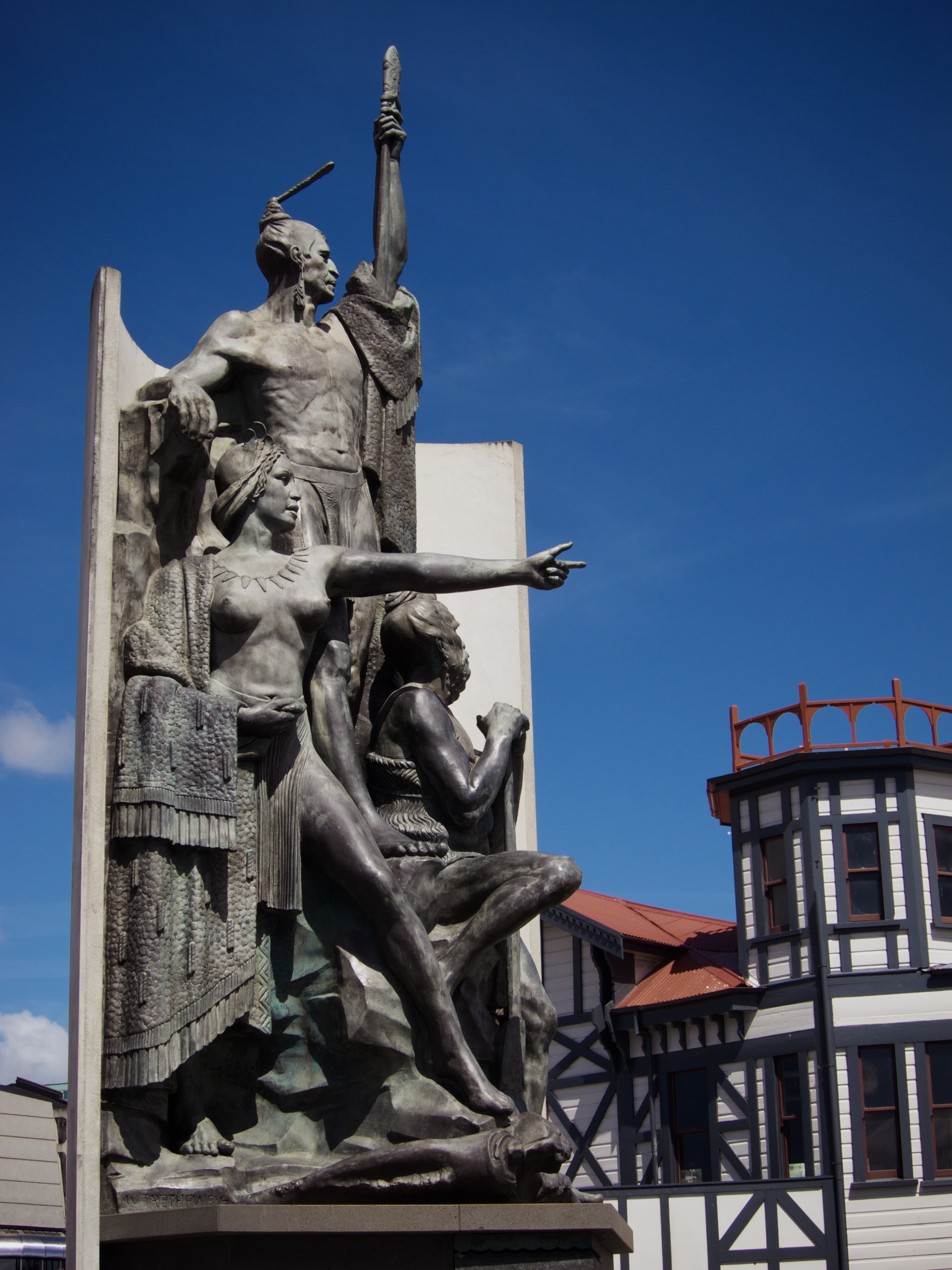
Kupe Statue on the Wellington Waterfront

=== Statue ===
William Trethewey produced the statuary for the New Zealand Centennial Exhibition that was held in 1939/40 in Rongotai, Wellington. A 100 feet (30 m) frieze depicted the progress of New Zealand, groupings of pioneers, lions in Art Deco style, a large fountain and a figure of Kupe standing on the prow of his canoe were produced for the centennial exhibition. Of all these works, only the Kupe Statue remains. After having spent many decades at Wellington railway station, then the Wellington Show and Sports Centre and finally at Te Papa, the Kupe Group Trust successfully fundraised to have the plaster statue cast in bronze. Since 2000, the bronze statue has been installed at the Wellington Waterfront.

=== Video games ===
Kupe leads the Māori civilization in the Gathering Storm expansion of Civilization VI.
