= Pacific Alliance Leaders Meeting =

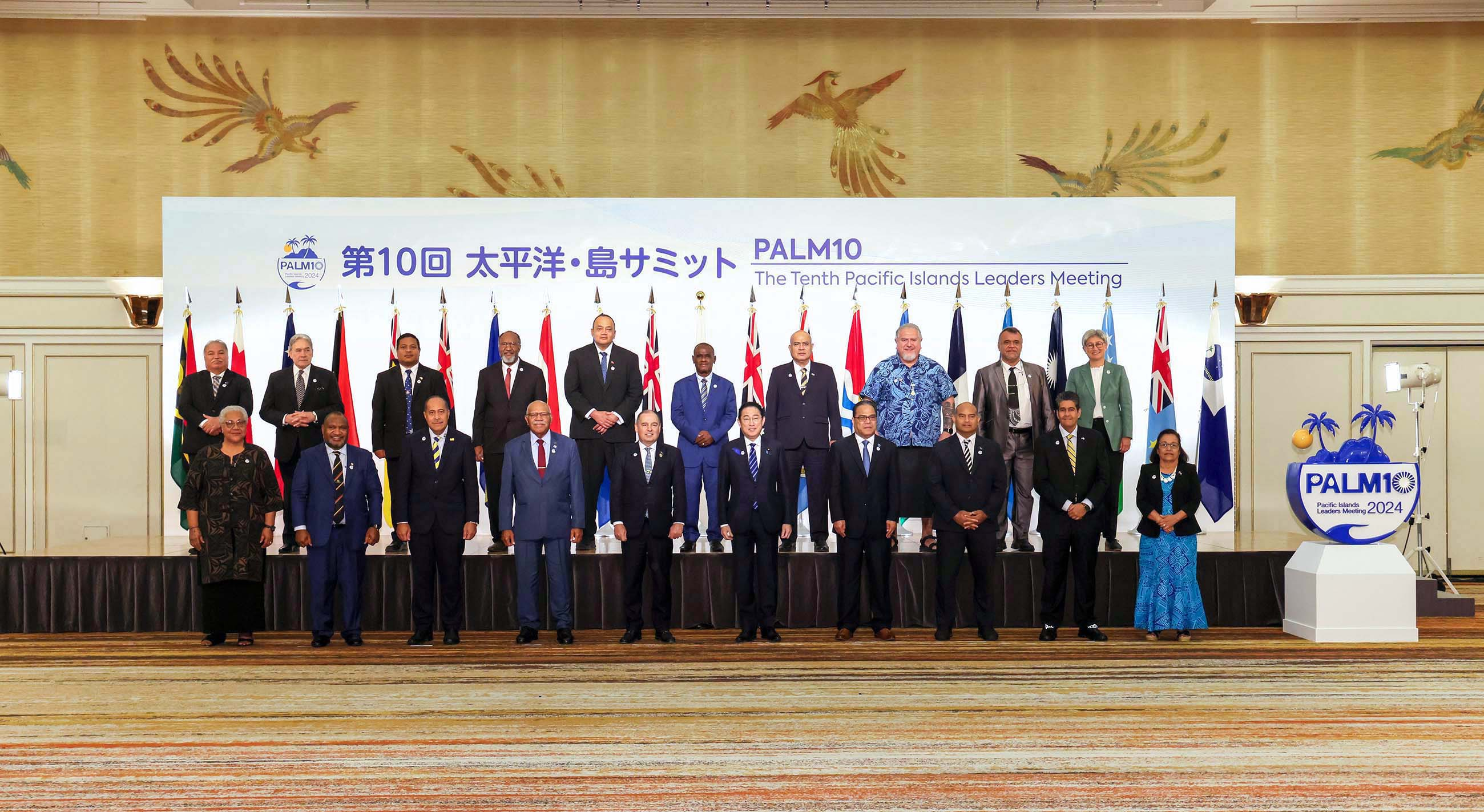
PALM 10 held in July 2024

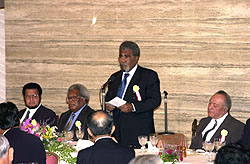
PNG’s PM Mekere Morauta at the luncheon meeting of PALM 2 held in April 2000

The Pacific Islands Leaders Meeting (PALM) is a forum between the government of Japan and leaders in the Pacific Islands region.

The Pacific Island Leaders Meeting was established by Japan in 1997 in order to facilitate and strengthen relations with the leaders of the nations of the Pacific Islands Forum. Since its foundation, PALM has become an important venue of dialogue between Japan and Pacific Island nations for important issues such as development aid and climate change.

== PALM meetings ==
#	Date	Location held
1st	1997	(Japan) Tokyo
2nd	2000	(Japan) Miyazaki
3rd	2003	(Japan) Okinawa
4th	2006	(Japan) Okinawa
5th	2009	(Japan) Hokkaido
6th	2012	(Japan) Okinawa
7th	2015	(Japan) Fukushima
8th	2018	online
9th	2021	online
10th	2024	(Japan) Tokyo

The first meeting took place in Tokyo in 1997.

=== PALM 4 ===
At the meeting of the fourth forum Pacific Island Leaders Meeting (PALM 4) in 2006, Japanese and Pacific leaders adopted the Okinawa Partnership. Under the Okinawa Partnership, Japan agreed to increase its commitment to the development of Pacific Islands Forum countries.

=== PALM 5 ===
The 5th forum of the Pacific Island Leaders Meeting (PALM 5) took place between May 22–23, 2009, in Hokkaido. The meeting was jointly co-chaired by then Prime Minister of Japan Taro Aso and the Premier of Niue Toke Talagi, who was also the chairman of the Pacific Islands Forum at the time.

The 2009 PALM summit was divided into three main themes or objectives.

- The first theme was entitled, "Eco-friendly: creating a Pacific Environmental Community," which addressed the issues concerning the environment and climate change.
- The second theme was called "Rich: Overcoming vulnerabilities and promoting human security." This objective discussed what are known as human security issues, including health, water supply, and education in the small island states of the Pacific. The main focus of this discussion was to build the capacity of these resources. Japan planned to discuss its efforts to alleviate the impact of the 2008 financial crisis on the Pacific island nations.
- The third theme was called "We are Islanders: People to People exchange." This theme's objective was to strengthen cultural exchanges of people between Japan and the Pacific Islands in a way that would benefit both sides strategically.

Fiji, which is under a military dictatorship, was invited to the 2009 PALM forum. However, Commander Frank Bainimarama, the leader of the 2006 coup, was not invited to the meeting.

=== PALM 6 ===
The sixth forum of the Pacific Island Leaders Meeting (PALM 6) took place between May 25–26, 2012.

== Participants ==
- Australia
- Cook Islands
- Federated States of Micronesia
- Fiji
- French Polynesia
- Japan
- Kiribati
- Marshall Islands
- Nauru
- New Caledonia
- New Zealand
- Niue
- Palau
- Papua New Guinea
- Samoa
- Solomon Islands
- Tonga
- Tuvalu
- Vanuatu
