= Pūhaorangi =

Mythical Māori being

- Celestial ancestor atua

Genealogy
- Consort: Te Kuraimonoa
- Children: Ohomairangi

In Māori mythology, Pūhaorangi ("Gentle Breath of Heaven") is a celestial being who descended from the heavens to sleep with the beautiful maiden Te Kuraimonoa ("Precious Treasure"). From this union came the revered ancestor Ohomairangi.

== Mythology ==
In one version of the myth, Pūhaorangi is said to have seen Te Kuraimonoa from the heavens and fallen in love instantly. He would descend to Earth to sleep with Te Kuraimonoa, who initially believed it was her husband sleeping with her, before finding out it was Pūhaorangi. Te Kuraimonoa fell pregnant, and birthed the ancestor demi-god Ohomairangi. Other versions say that Pūhaorangi transformed himself into a rupé (a dove or pigeon) and impregnated Te Kuraimonoa in that form.

It is because of this celestial origin that Ohomairangi and his descendants are known as Te Heketanga a Rangi (Offspring of Heaven). Many Māori trace their ancestry back to Ohomairangi and, by extension, Pūhaorangi and Te Kuraimonoa.
