= Polynesian Triangle =

Core area of Polynesia

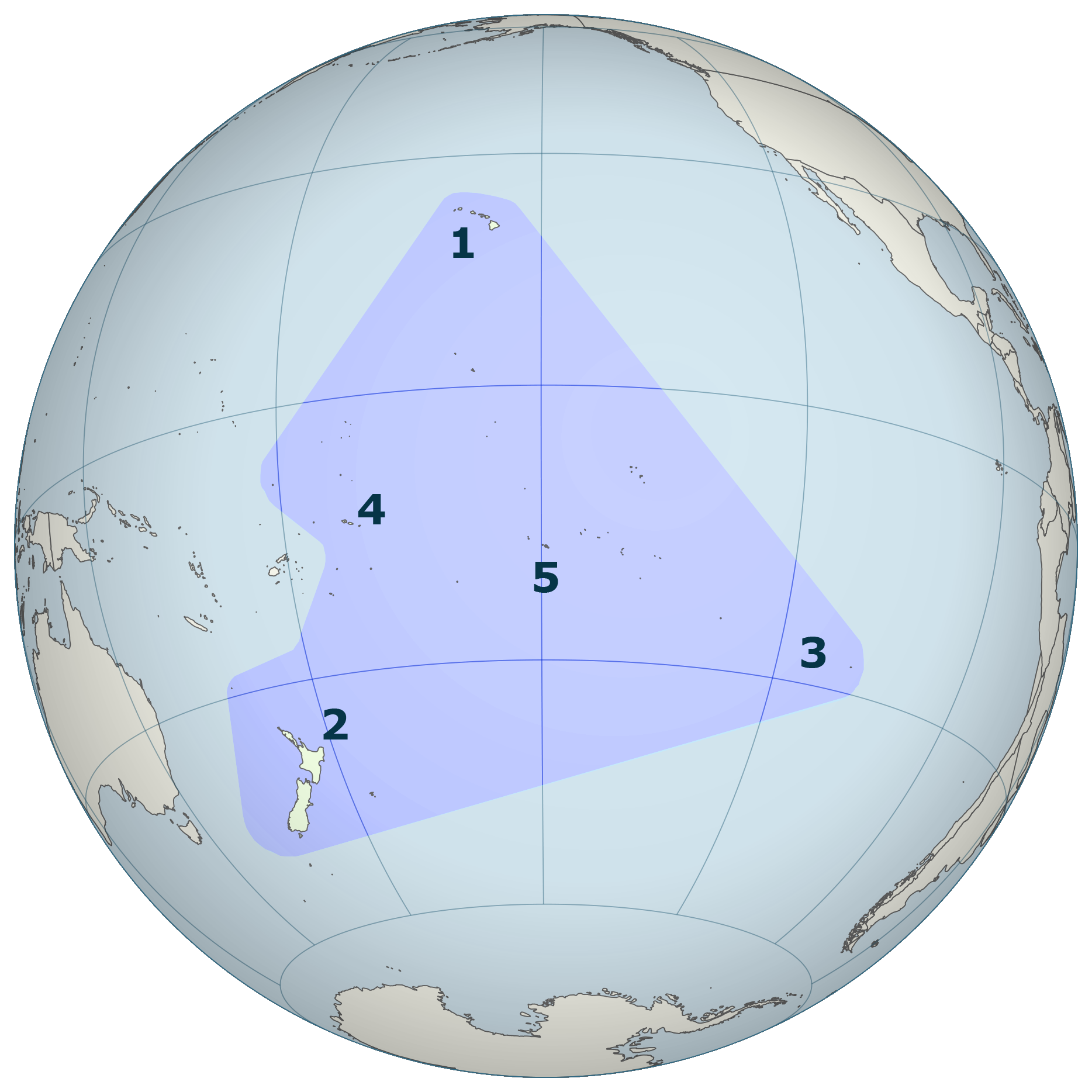
The Polynesian Triangle is a geographical region of the Pacific Ocean with Hawaii (Hawaiʻi – 1), New Zealand (Aotearoa – 2) and Easter Island (Rapa Nui – 3) at its corners, but excluding Fiji on its western side. At the center is Tahiti (Tahiti – 5), with Samoa (Sāmoa – 4) to the west.

The Polynesian Triangle is a region of the Pacific Ocean with three island groups at its corners: Hawaii (Hawaiʻi), Easter Island (Rapa Nui) and New Zealand (Aotearoa). This is often used as a simple way to define Polynesia.

Outside the triangle, there are traces of Polynesian settlement as far north as Necker Island (Mokumanamana), as far east as Salas y Gómez Island (Motu Motiro Hiva), and as far south as Enderby Island (Motu Maha) in the Auckland Islands. There have been ancient Polynesian settlements on Norfolk Island and the Kermadec Islands (Rangitahua). By the time the Europeans first arrived, these islands were all uninhabited.

Today, the most numerous Polynesian peoples are the Māori, Hawaiians (Kanaka Maoli), Tongans, Samoans, Niueans and Tahitians. The native languages of this vast triangle are Polynesian languages, which are classified by linguists as part of the Oceanic subgroup of Malayo-Polynesian. They ultimately derive from the proto-Austronesian language spoken in Southeast Asia 5,000 years ago. There are also numerous Polynesian outlier islands outside the triangle in neighboring Melanesia and Micronesia.

== History ==
Anthropologists believe that all modern Polynesian cultures descend from a single protoculture established in the South Pacific by migrant Malayo-Polynesian people (see also Lapita culture). There is also some evidence that Polynesians ventured as far east as Salas and Gómez Island and as far south as the sub-Antarctic islands to the south of New Zealand. However, none of these islands are considered part of Polynesia proper, as no viable settlements have survived. There are remains of a Polynesian settlement dating back to the 13th century on Enderby Island in the Auckland Islands. A shard of pottery was also recorded to have been found in the Antipodes Islands, but the Te Papa museum in Wellington has stated that they do not possess this shard and that the original description of the find did not say anything about its being Polynesian in origin.

In contrast to the shape of a triangle, another theory states that the geography of Polynesian society and navigation pathways more accurately resemble the geometric qualities of an octopus with head centred on Ra'iātea (French Polynesia) and tentacles spread out across the Pacific. In Polynesian oral tradition the octopus is known by various names such as Taumata-Fe'e-Fa'atupu-Hau (Grand Octopus of Prosperity), Tumu-Ra'i-Fenua (Beginning-of-Heaven-and-Earth) and Te Wheke-a-Muturangi (The Octopus of Muturangi).

== See also ==
- Ancient Hawaii
- Māori people origins
- Polynesian Leaders Group
- Te Wheke-a-Muturangi
