= Te Manihera Poutama =

Ngati Ruanui missionary (died 1847)

Te Manihera Poutama (? – 12 March 1847) was a New Zealand mission teacher and Anglican missionary. Of Māori descent, he identified with the Ngāti Ruanui iwi. He was born in Taranaki, New Zealand.
