= Purangi =

- Rural community
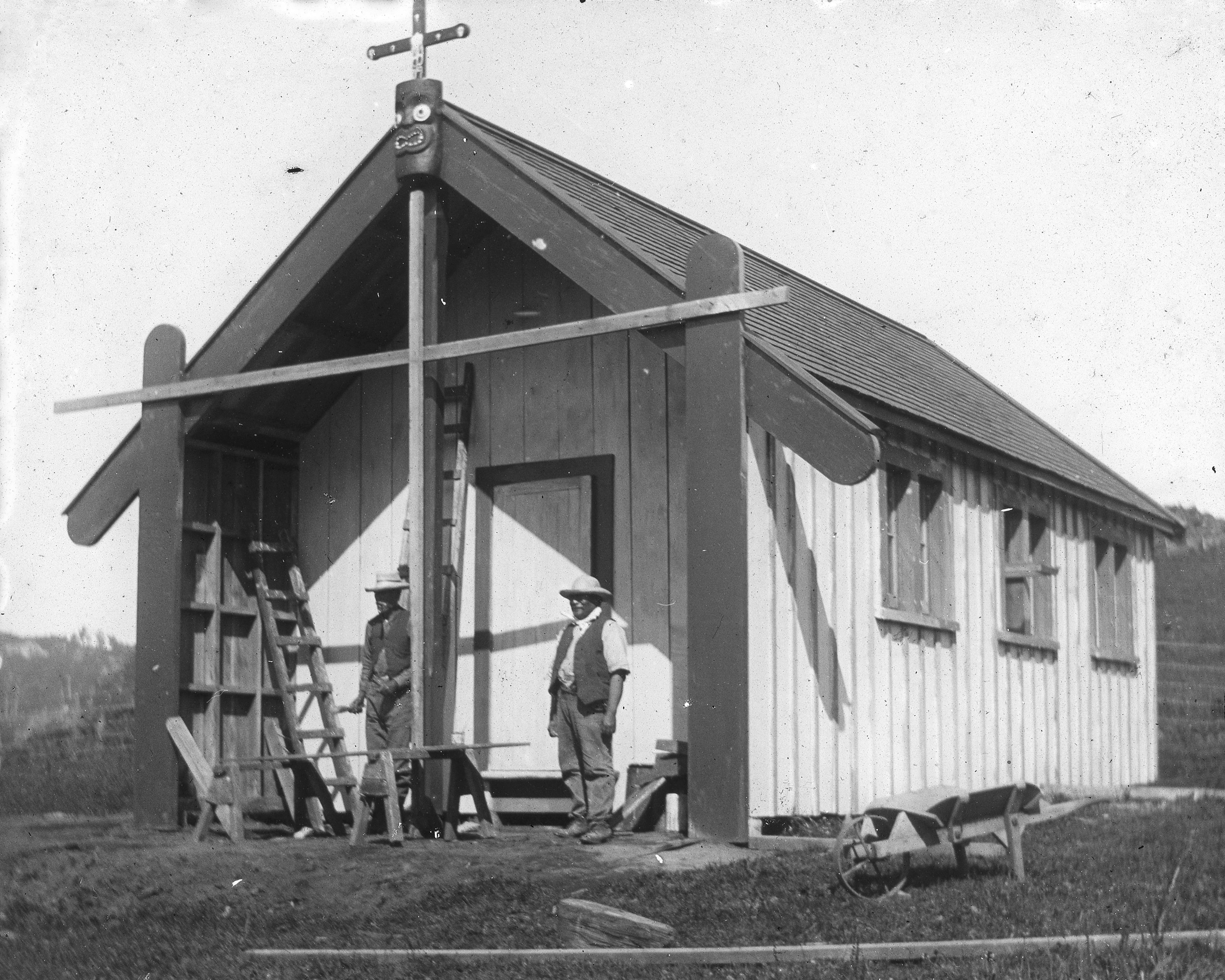
- Purangi Church
- Interactive map of Purangi
- Coordinates: 39°9′15″S 174°31′51″E
- Country: New Zealand
- Region: Taranaki
- Territorial authority: New Plymouth District
- Ward: Kōhanga Moa General Ward; Te Purutanga Mauri Pūmanawa Māori Ward
- Community: Inglewood Community
- Electorates: Taranaki-King Country; Te Tai Hauāuru (Māori)

Government
  - Territorial Authority: New Plymouth District Council
  - Regional council: Taranaki Regional Council
  - Mayor of New Plymouth: Max Brough
  - Taranaki-King Country MP: Barbara Kuriger
  - Te Tai Hauāuru MP: Debbie Ngarewa-Packer

Area
  - Total: 73.26 km^{2} (28.29 sq mi)

Population (2023 Census)
  - Total: 117
  - Density: 1.60/km^{2} (4.14/sq mi)

Purangi is a locality east of Inglewood, New Zealand, situated on the banks of the Waitara River. It is within the traditional tribal lands of Ngāti Maru iwi. Today, Ngāti Maru's headquarters are at Tarata. The Marae is called Te Upoko o te Whenua.

== History ==
=== Bell at Purangi ===
The locality of Purangi, includes the sites of three Maori kainga; Pukemahoe, Purangi and Te Pokuru Pa. The first two were on the banks of the Waitara River, about a mile and a half apart. Te Pokuru Pa was six or seven miles from Pukemahoe. The story of the bell begins with Rev. Richard Taylor, Missionary of the Whanganui district. He placed the charge of the bell with Himiona Te Kapiti, a Maori layreader. At the time, Himiona lived on the upper reaches of the Whanganui river and was mainly responsible for the extension of Christianity in those districts. From Himiona the bell passed into the hands of Te Manihera Te Ikahaehae, also a layreader, of the Ngāti Maru.

The bell was first used at Te Pokuru Pa, but the Pa was later deserted. During the 1850s, Ngati Maru erected an Anglican church at Pukemahoe, and so the bell was carried there. Once the bell was fixed in its place, Ngati Maru brought Archdeacon Govett (1819–1903) to open the church. There was much festivities on his arrival, for at the time he was the first white missionary who had ever gone into that part of the country. The chief of Purangi was Tutanuku Tume, elder brother of Te Manihera Tume. Both men were the nephews of Te Manihera Te Ikahaehae referred to above.

When the New Zealand Wars broke out in 1860, the newspaper of the day states that Tītokowaru (a Hauhau chief and freedom fighter against the Pakeha) desecrated the church. He tore up the floor and converted the church into a Wharenui (Maori meeting house). If this was the case, this did not happen until 1869, when Titokowaru arrived in the Ngati Maru rohe.

Te Haina'Uira'Wehikore, Manihera's sister, took charge of the bell, and kept it in her care. In 1888, she met with WH Skinner at Purangi and asked him to accept the bell back. She had two bells, a large one from the Anglican Church, and a smaller one from the Roman Catholic Mission at Ngakorako. Skinner accepted both bells, and returned the Roman Catholic bell to the priest in charge of New Plymouth and the Anglican bell to St Mary's parish. This bell was attached to St Marys Schoolroom, and it was still there at the turn of the 20th century.

=== Purangi Landless Natives Act 1907 ===
Large areas of land were confiscated in Taranaki under the New Zealand Settlements Act 1863 and its subsequent amendments. This rendered many Maori landless. In 1907, the Crown passed legislation that allowed for the landless Maori at Purangi to be provided with enough land each to support themselves. This legislation was called the Purangi Landless Natives Act 1907.

The First Schedule of the Act, listed the Maori who were entitled to receive land under this legislation. They were Tutanuku Tume, Te Ika Haehae, Kapohanga Wehikore, Uira Wehikore and 15 others. Te Ikahaehae in this schedule was also known as Te Manihera Te Ikahaehae.

== Demographics ==
Purangi locality covers 72.26 km^{2} (27.90 sq mi). The locality is part of the Tarata statistical area.

Historical population
Year	Pop.	±% p.a.
2006	117	—
2013	141	+2.70%
2018	117	−3.66%
2023	117	+0.00%

Purangi had a population of 117 in the 2023 New Zealand census, unchanged since the 2018 census, and a decrease of 24 people (−17.0%) since the 2013 census. There were 63 males and 54 females in 48 dwellings. The median age was 39.7 years (compared with 38.1 years nationally). There were 27 people (23.1%) aged under 15 years, 15 (12.8%) aged 15 to 29, 66 (56.4%) aged 30 to 64, and 12 (10.3%) aged 65 or older.

People could identify as more than one ethnicity. The results were 94.9% European (Pākehā), and 12.8% Māori. English was spoken by 97.4%, and other languages by 5.1%. The percentage of people born overseas was 12.8, compared with 28.8% nationally.

Religious affiliations were 28.2% Christian. People who answered that they had no religion were 53.8%, and 15.4% of people did not answer the census question.

Of those at least 15 years old, 6 (6.7%) people had a bachelor's or higher degree, 63 (70.0%) had a post-high school certificate or diploma, and 15 (16.7%) people exclusively held high school qualifications. The median income was $44,000, compared with $41,500 nationally. 15 people (16.7%) earned over $100,000 compared to 12.1% nationally. The employment status of those at least 15 was 57 (63.3%) full-time and 9 (10.0%) part-time.
