= Wiremu Hukunui Manaia =

New Zealand tribal leader

Wiremu Hukunui Manaia (died 1892) was a New Zealand tribal leader. Of Māori descent, he identified with the Ngāti Tu hapū Ngāti Ruanui iwi of South Taranaki. He was born in New Zealand.
