= Ngāti Ruanui =

Māori iwi (tribe) in Aotearoa New Zealand

- Iwi (tribe) in Māoridom
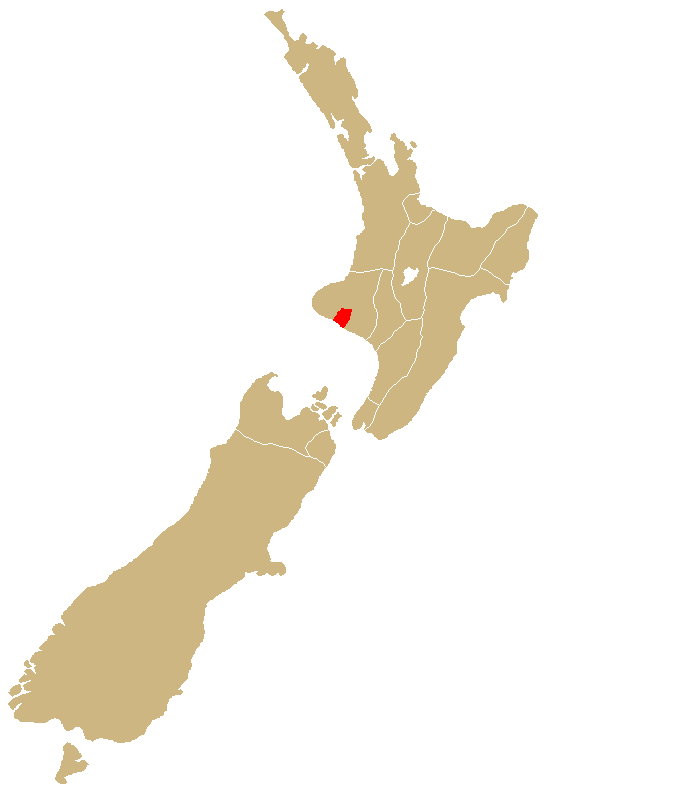
- Rohe (region): Taranaki
- Waka (canoe): Kurahaupō, Tākitimu, Aotea, Te Rangiuamutu
- Population: 7,035
- Website: www.ruanui.co.nz

Ngāti Ruanui is a Māori iwi traditionally based in the Taranaki region of New Zealand. In the 2006 census, 7,035 people claimed affiliation to the iwi. However, most members now live outside the traditional areas of the iwi.

== History ==
=== Early history ===
Ruanui is acknowledged as the eponymous ancestor of the iwi. He was the son of Uenuku-puanake and Tāneroroa. Uenuku came from the Tākitimu canoe (although this is contested among mātauranga Māori historians), while Tāneroroa was the daughter of Turi, who came to New Zealand on the Aotea canoe. Turi originally landed in Aotea Harbour, but eventually settled along the Pātea River. Over time, Ruanui’s descendants spread across south Taranaki.

=== Musket Wars ===
Ngāti Ruanui was heavily involved in tribal wars during the 19th century. In 1816, the iwi was invaded from the north by Ngā Puhi warriors carrying muskets. Over the next few decades, Ngāti Ruanui would come under attack by Ngāti Toa, Ngāti Whātua and the Waikato tribes. Ngāti Ruanui had no defence against the invaders armed with muskets, and many Ngāti Ruanui people were captured as slaves. Others were simply displaced by continuing warfare.

=== Early social development ===
Even amidst tribal warfare, Ngāti Ruanui managed to build a successful society. Agriculture provided a stable economy. Ngāti Ruanui workers were employed as labourers in New Plymouth. Education and Christianity were eagerly embraced.

=== New Zealand Wars ===
Ngāti Ruanui were wary of European settlers and their desire for more land. In 1860, when Te Āti Awa engaged in battle with the British Crown, Ngāti Ruanui sent fighters to support them. At least 10 members of Ngāti Ruanui and Ngāruahine died during the First Taranaki War, mostly during the defense of Waireka on 28 March 1860, including Te Rei Hanataua, chief of Tāngahoe hapū.

In retaliation, in 1865 and 1866, Crown troops invaded south Taranaki, destroying fortifications and villages. In 1868, notable resistance was provided by the tribal leader Tītokowaru against Crown troops approaching from the south. Amongst New Plymouth settlers the iwi was known as 'Ngāti Ruin-Ruin Us' for the effectiveness of their attacks. But within a few years, Ngāti Ruanui had lost most of its land, displacing more Māori from their traditional lands.

== Ngāti Ruanui today ==
=== Deed of Settlement ===
In 1996, the Waitangi Tribunal determined that the Crown had acted unfairly in its conflict with Ngāti Ruanui. A settlement between the New Zealand Government and Ngāti Ruanui was reached in 2001, which was passed into law in 2003. In summary:

- The New Zealand Government issued a formal apology to Ngāti Ruanui for the actions of Crown troops during the Taranaki Wars, and for subsequent land confiscation
- The Government acknowledged cultural association of Ngāti Ruanui with geographical areas in Taranaki, and will consult with the iwi regarding relevant uses within designated areas
- Four areas of significance to Ngāti Ruanui, totalling approximately 10 hectares, were returned to the iwi.

=== Administration ===
Te Rūnanga o Ngāti Ruanui is the governing body of the iwi. The Rūnanga manages the assets of the iwi, and represents the iwi in political consultations with the New Zealand Government.

=== Radio station ===
Te Korimako O Taranaki is the radio station of Ngāti Ruanui and other Taranaki region iwi, including Ngāti Tama, Te Atiawa, Ngāti Maru, Taranaki, Ngāti Mutunga, Ngāruahine, Ngā Rauru Kītahi. It started at the Bell Block campus of Taranaki Polytechnic in 1992, and moved to the Spotswood campus in 1993. It is available on 94.8 FM across Taranaki.

== Notable people ==
- Te Manihera Poutama ( -1847)
- Te Rei Hanataua ( -1860)
- Ngawaka Taurua ( -1888)
- Riwha Tītokowaru (1823–1888)
- Hone Pihama ( -1890)
- Wiremu Hukunui Manaia ( -1892)
- Sophia Hinerangi (1834–1911)
- Tamati Hone Oraukawa (fl. 1848–1869)
- Darcy Nicholas (1945- )
- Dalvanius Prime (1948–2002)
- Claudette Hauiti (1961- )
- Zoe Hobbs (1997-)

== See also ==
- List of Māori iwi
