= Te Wheke-a-Muturangi =

Māori Mythological octopus

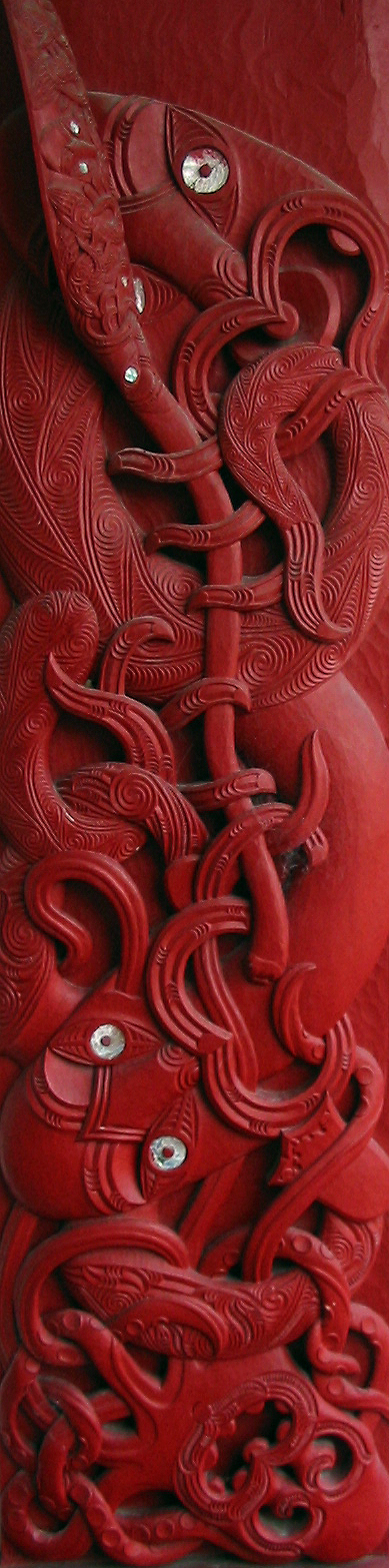
House carving showing Kupe (holding a paddle), with two sea creatures at his feet

In Māori mythology, Te Wheke-a-Muturangi is a monstrous octopus destroyed in Whekenui Bay, Tory Channel or at Pātea by Kupe the navigator.

The octopus was a pet or familiar of Muturangi, a powerful tohunga of Hawaiki. The wheke was nonetheless a wild creature and a guardian.

When Kupe reached New Zealand, he encountered the beast off Castlepoint. The giant octopus then fled across Cook Strait, and was chased by Kupe through Tory Channel. Here a great battle took place, and when the octopus appeared to be about to flee, Kupe cut off its arms with his adze, killing it (Tregear 1891: 184, 620).

In the traditions of the Ngāti Ranginui people of Tauranga, Te Wheke-a-Muturangi was killed by their ancestor Tamatea, and is not associated with Kupe. New Zealand ethnologist David Simmons has suggested that this may be the more authentic tradition, and that the association with Kupe is found only in problematic sources (Simmons 1976).

Another theory for Te Wheke-a-Muturangi states that the name actually refers to the many navigation paths centered on Raiatea with tentacles reaching out across the Pacific at least as far as the edges of the Polynesian Triangle (Tetahiotupa 2009). In French Polynesian oral tradition this octopus is also known as "Taumata-Feʻe-Faʻatupu-Hau" (Great Kraken of Prosperity) and "Tumu-Raʻi-Fenua" (Beginning-of-Heaven-and-Earth).

== See also ==
- Akkorokamui
- In Hawaiʻi, Kanaloa is symbolized by the squid or heʻe.
- Kraken
- Kupe
- Polynesian Leaders Group
- Polynesian Triangle
- Colossal squid, who inhabit the southern coasts of New Zealand
