= Hoturapa =

Chief of Hawaiki in Māori tradition

In Māori tradition, Hoturapa was a chief of Hawaiki. His wife Kuramārōtini owned the canoe Matahourua. One day, Hoturapa and his wife went out fishing in the Matahourua with their friend Kupe. Kupe tricked Hoturapa to dive into the water to free one of the lines. Once Hoturapa was overboard, Kupe set sail for New Zealand with Kuramārōtini (Tregear 1891:86, 186).
