= Tamati Hone Oraukawa =

New Zealand Māori leader

Tamati Hone Oraukawa (fl. 1848–1869) was a New Zealand tribal leader. Of Māori descent, he identified with Manuhiakai hapū of Nga Ruahine and Ngati Ruanui iwi. He was active from about 1848.
