= Te Rei Hanataua =

New Zealand tribal leader

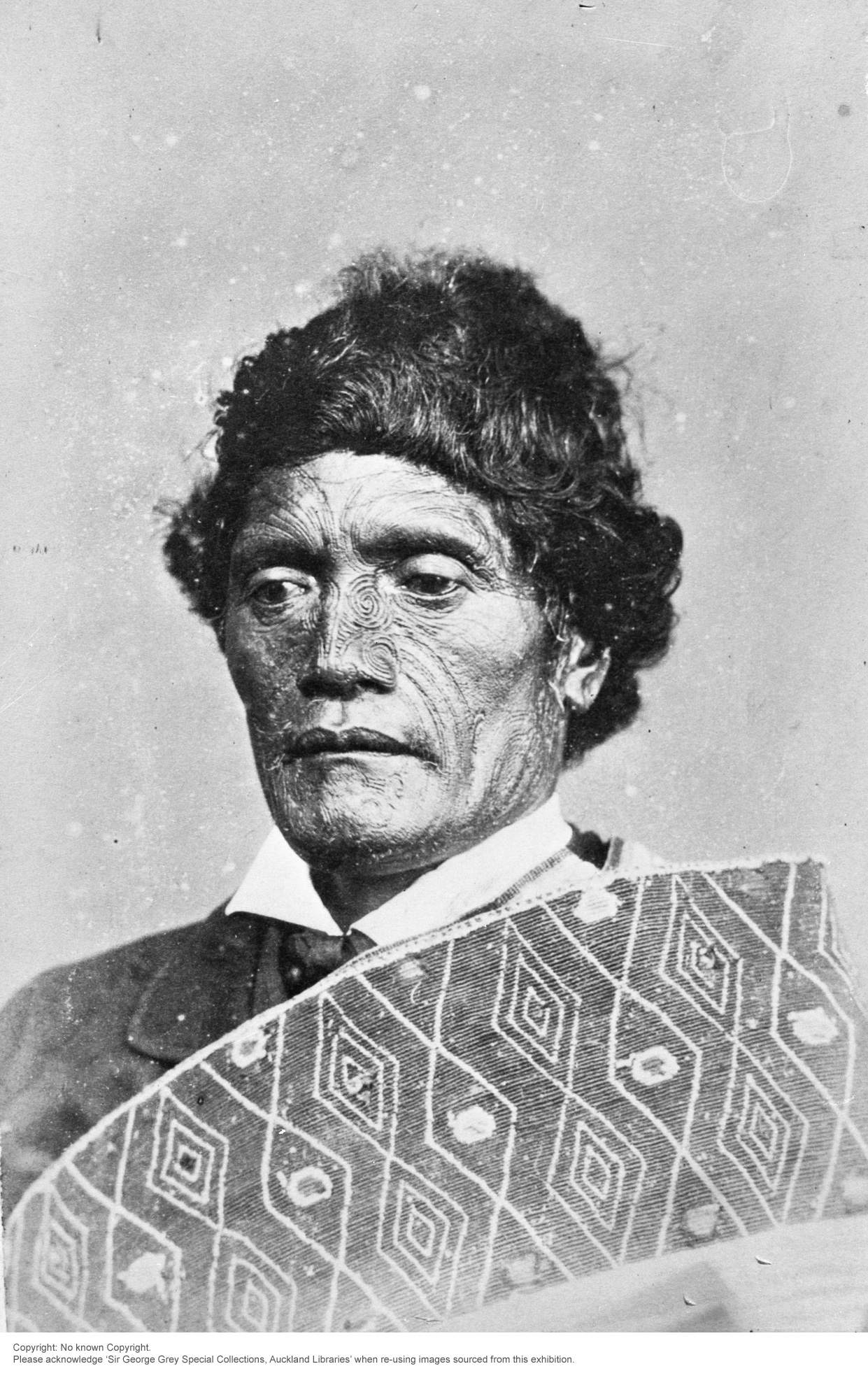
Te Rei Hanataua

Te Rei Hanataua (?–1860) was a notable New Zealand tribal leader. Of Māori descent, he identified with the Ngāti Ruanui iwi.
