= Ngāruahine =

Māori iwi (tribe) in Aotearoa New Zealand

- Iwi (tribe) in Māoridom
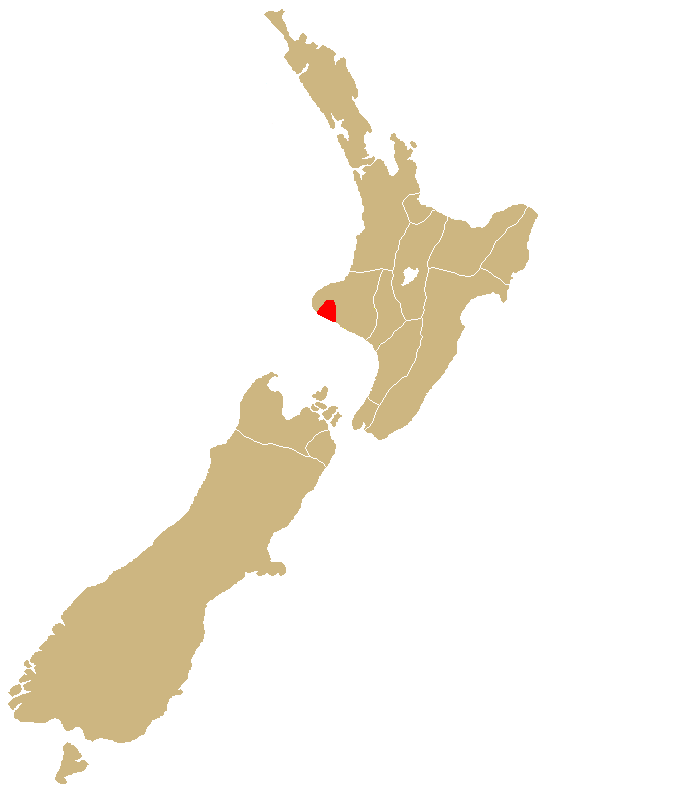
- Rohe (region): South Taranaki
- Waka (canoe): Aotea
- Website: www.ngaruahine.iwi.nz

Ngāruahine is a Māori iwi of New Zealand located in South Taranaki, North Island.

== Treaty settlement ==
A treaty settlement was signed with the Crown in 2014. Following ratification of the settlement with the Crown, Te Korowai o Ngāruahine Trust (TKONT) was established as the Post Treaty Settlement Entity responsible for receiving, and managing the settlement funds (pūtea).

== Iwi radio station ==
Te Korimako O Taranaki is the radio station of Ngāruahine and other Taranaki region iwi, including Ngāti Tama, Te Atiawa, Ngāti Maru, Taranaki, Ngāti Mutunga, Ngāti Ruanui, Ngā Rauru Kītahi. It started at the Bell Block campus of Taranaki Polytechnic in 1992, and moved to the Spotswood campus in 1993. It is available on 94.8 FM across Taranaki.

== Notable people ==
- Zoe Hobbs
- Campbell-Kirk Kawana-Waugh
- Tamati Hone Oraukawa
- Tītokowaru
- Hone Pihama

== See also ==
- List of iwi
