= Minister of Foreign Affairs (Niue) =

Position in the government of Niue

This is a list of foreign ministers of Niue.

- 1999–2002: Sani Lakatani
- 2002–2008: Young Vivian
- 2008–2020: Toke Talagi
- 2020–present: Dalton Tagelagi

== Sources ==
- Rulers.org – Foreign ministers L–R
