= China–Niue relations =

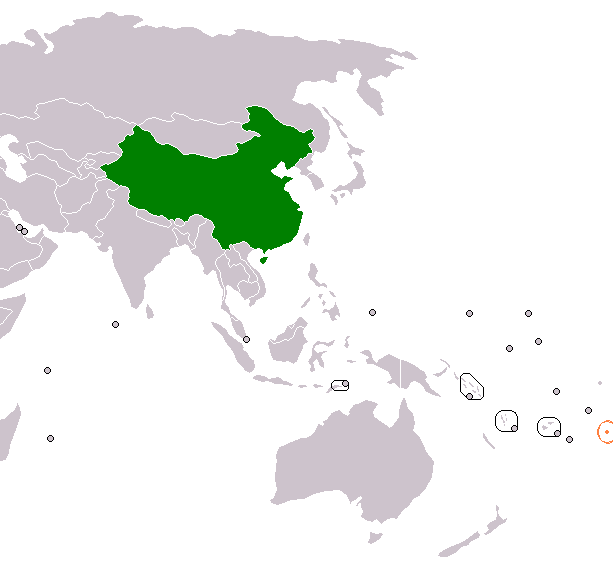

- China: Niue

China–Niue relations are the bilateral relations between China and Niue.

== Background ==
Niue has been self-governing in free association with New Zealand since 3 September 1974 when the people endorsed the Constitution in a plebiscite. Niue is fully responsible for its internal affairs. Niue's position concerning its external relations is less clear cut. Section 6 of the Niue Constitution Act provides that:

Nothing in this Act or in the Constitution shall affect the responsibilities of Her Majesty the Queen in right of New Zealand for the external affairs and defence of Niue.

Section 8 elaborates as follows:

Effect shall be given to the provisions of sections 6 and 7 [concerning external affairs and defence and economic and administrative assistance respectively] of this Act, and to any other aspect of the relationship between New Zealand and Niue which may from time to time call for positive co-operation between New Zealand and Niue after consultation between the Prime Minister of New Zealand and the Premier of Niue, and in accordance with the policies of their respective Governments; and, if it appears desirable that any provision be made in the law of Niue to carry out these policies, that provision may be made in the manner prescribed in the Constitution, but not otherwise.

== History ==
The establishment of diplomatic relations between Niue and China followed a number of discussions between the two sides. In 2004, Chinese Premier Wen Jiabao sent a telegram to Niue PM Young Vivian to convey his sympathy on Niue suffering from the windstorm. In April, 2006, Premier Wen met with PM Young Vivian during the conference of “China-Pacific Island Countries Economic Development & Cooperation Forum” held in Fiji. Niuean Prime Minister Young Vivian and the Chinese Foreign Minister, Li Zhaoxing, held discussions in Wellington in on 1 August 2006. In June 2007, Niue PM Young Vivian visited China.

Niue established diplomatic relations with the People's Republic of China on December 12, 2007. Notwithstanding Niue's constitutional position, the New Zealand government is clear that it does have the capacity and right to establish diplomatic relations with any country, the New Zealand government website stating that:

For all practical purposes Niue conducts its own external relations, including establishing formal diplomatic relations with other states.

Traditionally, Niue's foreign relations and defence have been regarded as the responsibility of New Zealand, which has full diplomatic relations with China. Importantly, it is a requirement of Niue's constitution that in such matters," consultation between the Prime Minister of New Zealand and the Premier of Niue" must take place and it is not clear that such consultation did, in fact, take place before Niue purported to establish diplomatic relations with China. As such, Niue's authorities may have acted outside the powers conferred on them under Niue's constitution.

Another notable matter is that the Joint Communique signed by Niue and China is different in its treatment of the Taiwan question from that agreed by New Zealand and China. New Zealand "acknowledged" China's position on Taiwan but has never expressly agreed with it, but Niue "recognizes that there is only one China in the world, the Government of the People's Republic of China is the sole legal government representing the whole of China and Taiwan is an inalienable part of the territory of China." Critics have asked whether Niueans can continue to benefit from free association with New Zealand and yet disregard New Zealand's advice and establish an independent foreign policy.

On 18 October 2008, Zhang Limin, China's first ambassador to Niue, presented his credentials to Niue Prime Minister Toke Talagi in the capital of Alofi. His credentials were accepted by the Niuean Premier. Mr. Zhang is also China's ambassador to New Zealand where he is based.

In July 2009, Talagi stated that, if development aid were not forthcoming from New Zealand, he would request aid from China instead.

China's opening of diplomatic relations with Niue may be seen within the wider context of China's relations with the Pacific region. Every independent country in Oceania currently maintains diplomatic and economic relations either with the People's Republic of China or with the Republic of China (Taiwan).
