= Toke Talagi =

Premier of Niue from 2008 to 2020

The Honourable Sir Toke Talagi KNZM
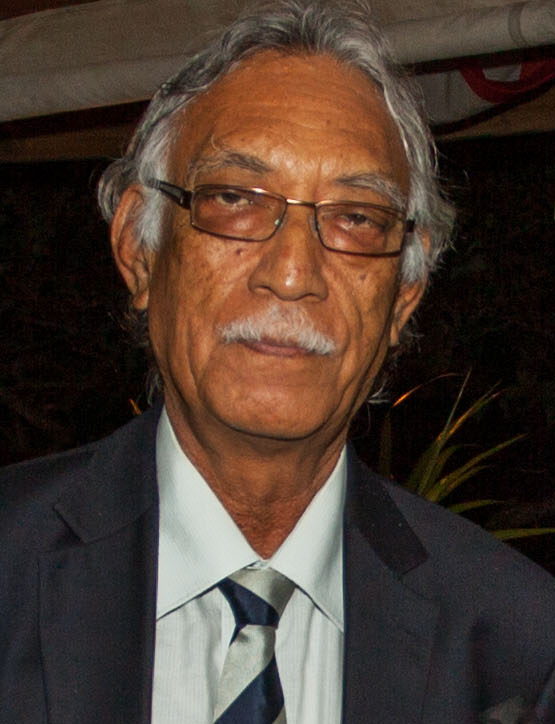
- Talagi in 2014

Premier of Niue
- In office 19 June 2008 – 11 June 2020
- Monarch: Elizabeth II
- Governor-General: Anand Satyanand; Jerry Mateparae; Patsy Reddy
- Preceded by: Young Vivian
- Succeeded by: Dalton Tagelagi

Minister of Foreign Affairs
- In office 19 June 2008 – 11 June 2020
- Premier: Himself
- Preceded by: Young Vivian
- Succeeded by: Dalton Tagelagi

Minister of Finance
- In office 1 May 2002 – 16 May 2005
- Premier: Young Vivian
- Succeeded by: Young Vivian

Member of the Niue Assembly for Common roll
- In office 19 March 1999 – 30 May 2020

Personal details
- Born: Toke Tufukia Talagi; 9 January 1951 Alofi, Niue
- Died: 15 July 2020 (aged 69) Alofi, Niue
- Party: Independent
- Spouse: Emeline Fifitaloa
- Children: Sonya Talagi
- Education: Nelson College; Massey University

Sir Toke Tufukia Talagi KNZM (/ˈtoʊkə ˈtɑːlʌŋi/ TOH-kə TAH-lung-ee; 9 January 1951 – 15 July 2020) was a Niuean politician, diplomat, and statesman. He served as Premier of Niue from 2008 to 2020.

In 1999, he was elected to the Niue Assembly as an independent. He was elected premier in the 2008 general election. During his tenure as premier, he was also Minister of Foreign Affairs. He unsuccessfully ran for a fifth-term in 2020 and was subsequently replaced by Dalton Tagelagi. Prior to becoming Premier, Talagi was Minister of Finance from 2002 until 2005.

In the 2017 New Year Honours, Talagi was appointed Knight Companion of the New Zealand Order of Merit (KNZM).

== Early life ==
Talagi was born in Alofi and was educated at Tufukia School in Niue and Nelson College in New Zealand. He studied at Massey University in Palmerston North, where he completed a Bachelor of Agricultural Science. While there, he was elected president of the Pacific Island Students Association and organised protests against nuclear testing and racial discrimination. He married his wife, and they had their first child.

On returning to Niue he worked as a livestock development officer. In 1977 he became a member of the Alofi south Village Council. He later became president of the Niue Public Service Association, and from 1981 to 1984 he was Niue's first Consul General in Auckland. On his return to Niue he was appointed Director for Niue's Economic Affairs Office, and was responsible for major infrastructure development. After leaving the public service he became an airline and shipping agent. In 1992, he received a heart transplant, and spent the next several years living in New Zealand. In 1998 he became president of the Niue Rugby Football Union.

Talagi's children include Sonya Talagi.

== Political career ==
Talagi ran unsuccessfully for a common roll seat in the 1996 Niuean general election. He was elected to the Niue Assembly in the 1999 election and was immediately appointed an associate Minister with responsibility for economic development and civil aviation in the Cabinet of Sani Lakatani. In October 1999 he resigned his Ministerial position over Lakatani's plans to establish an airline, and submitted a motion of no confidence against him. He spent the remainder of the term as a member of the opposition.

Following the 2002 election he was appointed Minister of Finance and Tourism in the Cabinet of Young Vivian. In July of that year he was relieved of the Tourism portfolio in a Cabinet reshuffle. He was later appointed Deputy Prime Minister.

As Finance Minister he was responsible for managing the recovery from Cyclone Heta and was the subject of public criticism over the distribution of aid and allocation of new houses. As a result, he narrowly missed out on a common roll seat at the 2005 election, falling two votes behind Maihetoe Hekau in provisional results. The final result showed an exact tie, and Talagi was declared elected after his name was drawn from a hat. He was subsequently dropped from Cabinet.

== Premier ==
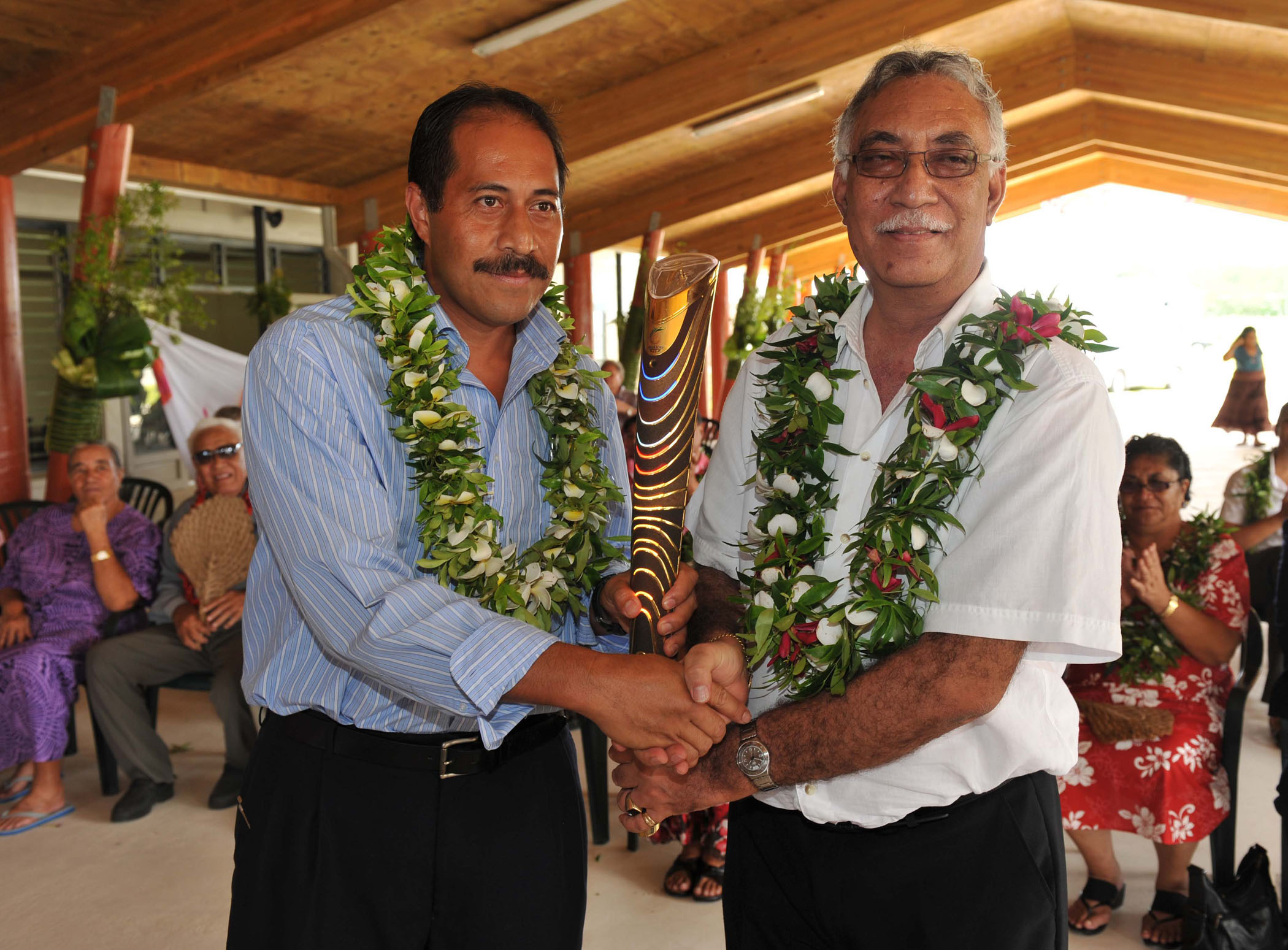
Talagi with his eventual successor Dalton Tagelagi in May 2010

Talagi was re-elected at the 2008 election, topping the common roll in what was seen as a vote for change. He was elected Premier on 19 June 2008, defeating Young Vivian by fourteen votes to five, with one abstaining. As Premier, he introduced a new consumption tax to balance the budget, established diplomatic relations with China, and attempted to negotiate with New Zealand for greater control of aid funding. When those negotiations were unsuccessful, he used the threat of seeking Chinese assistance to leverage a better deal. A major driver of his policies was to develop Niue and gain greater economic independence from New Zealand.

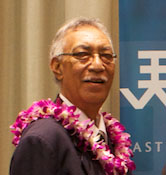
Talagi in 2011

In August 2008 Talagi became chair of the Pacific Islands Forum. At the 2008 Forum meeting in Niue he used the position to focus on climate change and the need for new elections in Fiji following the 2006 Fijian coup d'état. The latter led to a diplomatic dispute with Fiji, calls for the Forum to split, and in May 2009, the suspension of Fiji from the Forum. At the next forum meeting in 2009 Talagi suggested that Fijians should take responsibility for their destiny and rise up against the military regime.

In May 2009, Talagi co-chaired the 5th Pacific Alliance Leaders Meeting (PALM) with then Japanese Prime Minister Taro Aso in Hokkaido.

Talagi was re-elected at the 2011 election and re-elected as Premier. In his second term Talagi reformed the tax system and began free-trade negotiations with China. He continued to push for stronger international action on climate change and announced an ambition for Niue to become 100% solar powered. In November 2011 Niue became a founding member of the Polynesian Leaders Group, a regional grouping intended to cooperate on a variety of issues including culture and language, education, responses to climate change, and trade and investment. In 2013 he won a significant shift from the New Zealand government on superannuation portability, allowing Niueans to collect New Zealand superannuation in Niue. In early 2014 a proposal by Talagi to house asylum seekers for Australia as part of its Pacific Solution was rejected by the Niuean Assembly.

He was again re-elected Premier after the 2014 election. In his third term Niue planned to privatise its health system and celebrated 40 years of self-government. Talagi's foreign policy continued to focus on climate change, and he began a push for membership in the United Nations. In 2015 he became the first Niuean leader to meet the Queen. In 2016 he was medevaced to New Zealand twice for medical treatment.

In 2017 he announced he would seek a fourth term as Premier, saying that he had "unfinished business" to attend to. He was re-elected at the 2017 election and again elected Premier. In 2017 he again had an extended stay in Auckland for medical treatment, and as a result missed the budget vote. His fourth term also saw disputes with New Zealand over pension portability and the government accounts. In 2019 he spent several more months in Auckland recovering from illness, and on his return his brother Billy Talagi continued as acting Premier. The term was capped off by Niue losing control of its internet domain, and a damning audit report into the government's finances.

Despite these setbacks, Talagi announced he would seek a fifth term as Premier in the 2020 election. He kept a low profile during the campaign, and failed to win a seat. He was replaced as Premier by Dalton Tagelagi.

== Death ==
On 9 July 2020, Talagi was again medevaced to New Zealand for treatment of a long-term illness. He died at the Niue Foou Hospital in Alofi on 15 July 2020, shortly after returning to Niue. After his death, New Zealand Prime Minister Jacinda Ardern said that Talagi would be "remembered for his lifelong commitment to safeguarding Niue’s future security and prosperity".

Talagi was given a state funeral at the Alofi Ekalesia church on 28 July 2020.

== Recognition ==
In the 2017 New Year Honours, Talagi was appointed Knight Companion of the New Zealand Order of Merit (KNZM). He received his knighthood from New Zealand Governor General Patsy Reddy in March 2017, who flew to Niue for the ceremony. New Zealand Post marked the occasion with a commemorative stamp issue.

In November 2019 Talagi released an autobiography, Niue Rising.

== Bibliography ==
- Talagi, Toke (2019). Niue Rising. Xlibris Corporation. ISBN 9781543495546.

Political offices
Preceded by Young Vivian	Premier of Niue; 2008–2020	Succeeded by Dalton Tagelagi
Preceded by Young Vivian	Minister of Foreign Affairs; 2008–2020	Succeeded by Dalton Tagelagi
