= Polynesian Leaders Group =

International governmental cooperation group

- Logo

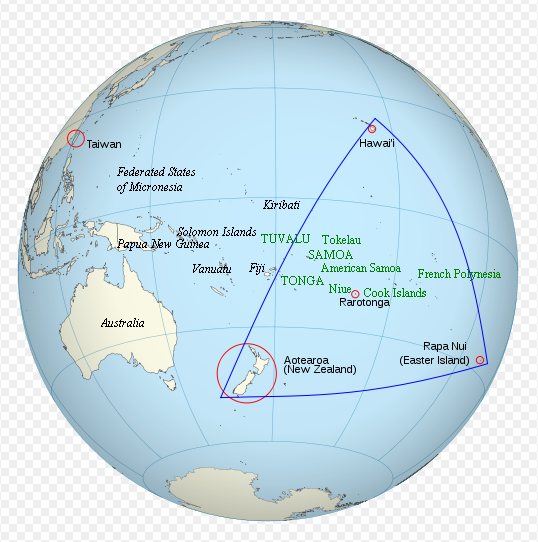
- Seat: by rotation
- Members: 4 sovereign states: Samoa; Tonga; Tuvalu; New Zealand; 8 territories: Cook Islands; Niue; American Samoa; French Polynesia; Tokelau; Wallis and Futuna; Hawaii; Easter Island

Leaders
  - Chairman: (Samoa) Afega Gaulofa
- Establishment: 2011

The Polynesian Leaders Group (PLG) is an international governmental cooperation group bringing together four independent countries and eight self-governing territories in Polynesia.

The idea of a Polynesian regional grouping had been discussed for several years, notably in response to the Melanesian Spearhead Group, a regional grouping for countries in Melanesia. In September 2011, Samoan Prime Minister Tuilaepa Sa’ilele Malielegaoi initiated a meeting with the leaders of Tonga, Tuvalu, the Cook Islands and Niue on the margins of the Pacific Islands Forum summit in Auckland. These initial talks led to a second meeting in Apia which, on 17 November, led to a memorandum of understanding formally establishing the Polynesian Leaders Group (PLG).

The Group does not have a fixed Secretariat at present, despite initial suggestions that one would be established in Apia. The Group held its first formal meeting in Rarotonga in the Cook Islands in August 2012.

== History ==
The idea of a 'Polynesian Alliance' in order to address social and economic issues within the Pacific has been discussed since the between the 1870s and 1890s when King Kamehameha V of Hawaii, King Pomare V of Tahiti, King Malietoa Laupepa of Samoa and King George Tupou II of Tonga agreed to establish a confederation of Polynesian states, of which did not eventuate.

The idea once again arose in the 1970s with the Kingitanga of New Zealand, an its leader Te Atairangikaahu, reviving the idea of an alliance similar to, but separate from, the Pacific Islands Forum. Fiji and Samoa were also parties to these discussions.

== Goals ==
Memorandum of Understanding
Announcing the launch, Prime Minister Tuilaepa said the member countries would work together "through this group to seek a future for our Polynesian people and countries where cultures, traditions and values are honored and protected. Where sustainable economic prosperity is achieved, where democratic values are observed, human rights promoted and protected as well as upholding the rule of law." It was also announced that the countries would cooperate in the fields of "education, culture and language, transport, environmental conservation and climate change mitigation and adaptation, health, agriculture and fisheries, tourism, trade and investment".

The fourth section of the Memorandum of Understanding read; The meeting decided that through the PLG, members will work together in the spirit of mutual understanding and cooperation to: Encourage sharing knowledge and experiences in awareness and education to promote and protect cultures, traditions and languages; Encourage mutual support of development efforts in areas including but not limited to: transport, energy, environmental conservation, climate change, education, health, agriculture and fisheries, tourism, trade and investment; Encourage respect for the quality of governance, observance of democratic values and human rights rule of law and right to self-determination; Encourage the strengthening of connections with institutions of regional and international cooperation.

Overseas workers
In 2013, the PLG ended their annual meeting with an announcement pushing New Zealand and Australia to increase its seasonal workers quotas in order for more Pacific peoples to gain seasonal work in these countries.

== Membership ==
There are eight founding members: three sovereign states (Samoa, Tonga and Tuvalu), two self-governing states in free association with New Zealand (the Cook Islands and Niue), an unincorporated territory of the United States (American Samoa), an overseas country of France (French Polynesia), and a nation that is also a dependency of New Zealand (Tokelau).

=== Expansion ===
In September 2017, the Group added the French overseas collectivity of Wallis and Futuna as a member. Wallis and Futuna would be the first new member since the Group was founded in 2011.

In June 2018, the Group voted to add three members: the sovereign state of New Zealand, the U.S. state of Hawaii, and the Chilean territory of Easter Island (Rapa Nui). As far back as September 2011, Niuean Premier Toke Talagi had noted that "we consider New Zealand and Hawaii, for example, as being part of the Polynesian Triangle so they could very well be part of the members of this Polynesian Group". Tuilaeapa, while also acknowledging that New Zealand was geographically part of Polynesia, said there might be "complications" to inviting New Zealand into the Group.

When the new members were formally announced, the Group's then-chairman, Enele Sopoaga, prime minister of Tuvalu, said, "we welcome other Polynesian communities in other places and locations to join the PLG as brothers," and emphasized the need for Polynesian communities to come together to address common problems. Commentators also noted that the addition of New Zealand and Hawaii could bring additional resources to the Group and increase the potential for strategic cooperation with the United States. Further, the addition of Easter Island raised questions about the relationship between the Group's interest in decolonization and Easter Island's political status within Chile.

== Founding leaders ==
Country	Head of Government	Status governing
American Samoa	Governor Togiola Tulafono	observer member
Cook Islands	Prime Minister Henry Puna	self-governing
French Polynesia	President Oscar Temaru	observer member
Niue	Premier Toke Talagi	self-governing
Samoa	Prime Minister Tuilaepa Sailele Malielegaoi	sovereign state
Tokelau	Ulu Foua Toloa	observer member
Tonga	Prime Minister Lord Tuʻivakano	sovereign state
Tuvalu	Prime Minister Willy Telavi	sovereign state

== Meetings ==
PLG Annual Meetings
No	Date	Location	Host	Host leader	Notes
1st	17 November 2011	Apia	Samoa	Tuilaepa Sailele Malielegaoi	
2nd	August 2012	Rarotonga	Cook Islands	Henry Puna	
3rd	30 August 2013	Auckland	French Polynesia	Gaston Flosse	
4th	26 July 2014	Auckland	Niue	Toke Talagi	
5th	5 September 2015	Auckland	Tokelau	Aliki Faipule Siopili Perez	
6th	29 June 2016	Papeete	French Polynesia	Édouard Fritch	
7th	4 September 2017	Apia	Samoa	Tuilaepa Sailele Malielegaoi	
8th	28 June 2018	Tuvalu	Tuvalu	Enele Sosene Sopoaga	
9th	August 2019	Tuvalu	Tuvalu		50th Pacific Islands Forum & Related Meetings
10th	29 January 2021	Virtual meeting	American Samoa	Lemanu Peleti Mauga	"Building Resilience in Times of Uncertainty"

== Leadership ==
Chairs

#	Name	Country/State	Term Office	Notes
1	Tuilaepa Sailele Malielegaoi	Samoa	2011–2012	
2	Henry Puna	Cook Islands	2012–2013	
3	Gaston Flosse	French Polynesia	2013–2014	
4	Toke Talagi	Niue	2014–2015	
6	Aliki Faipule Afega Gaualofa	Tokelau	2015–2023	
7	Moetai Brotherson	French Polynesia	2023–présent	

== See also ==
- Melanesian Spearhead Group
- Pacific Islands Forum
- Polynesian Triangle
- Te Wheke-a-Muturangi
