= Hone Pihama =

Hone Pihama Te Rei Hanataua (?–1890) was a notable New Zealand tribal leader, assessor, coach proprietor, hotel proprietor and land developer. Of Māori descent, he identified with the Ngati Ruanui iwi.
