= Aotea (canoe) =

Great Māori migration waka

- Great Māori migration waka
- Commander: Turi
- Landed at: Aotea Harbour
- Iwi: Ngāti Ruanui, Ngā Ruahine, Ngā Rauru
- Settled at: Taranaki

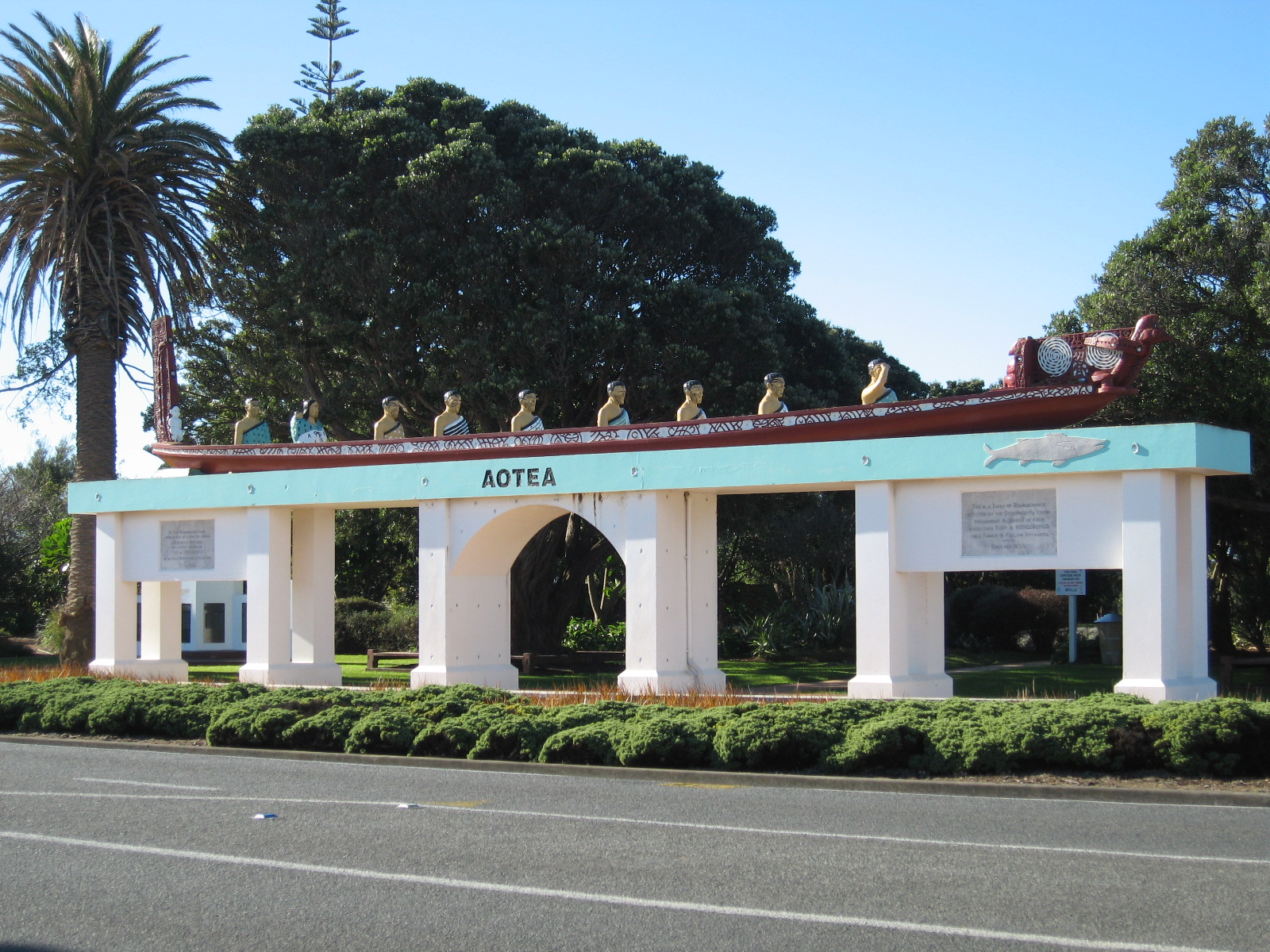
Remembrance arch, Patea unveiled by the Minister of Internal Affairs 2 August 1933

In Māori tradition, Aotea is one of the canoes (waka) in which Māori migrated to New Zealand; it is particularly associated with the tribes of Taranaki and Whanganui, including Ngāti Ruanui, Ngāruahine, Ngā Rauru and other tribal groups.

== History ==
Aotea was a double canoe built by Toto from half of a great tree from Hawaiki, the other half being used for the canoe Matahourua. Toto gave Aotea to his daughter Rongorongo, who was married to Turi. In strife with the chief Uenuku, Turi killed the chief's son and thereafter had to flee for New Zealand with 33 passengers. During the voyage, they stopped at Rangitahua. This has been identified by some as Raoul Island in the Kermadec Islands, but Tregear says 'this island cannot now be identified'. At Rangitahua they encountered some of the crew from the Kurahaupō canoe.

The Aotea canoe made landfall in New Zealand to the north of Kāwhia on the west coast of the North Island, and its people eventually trekked overland to the Taranaki region, where they settled. The canoe was left behind, and became the namesake for Aotea Harbour.

The upkeep and painting of the figurines sitting in the waka has been completed by a descendant of the whānau the waka represents.

== Aircraft ==
'Aotea' was the name given to the first Jumbo Jet (a Boeing 747-219B. Registration: ZK-NZV) acquired by Air New Zealand. This aircraft and several more of her type were acquired by Air New Zealand as a replacement aircraft for the carriers' DC-10 fleet.

== See also ==
- List of Māori waka
