= Muturangi =

High priest in Māori mythology

In Māori mythology, Muturangi, also known as Ruamuturangi, was a renowned high priest (tohunga) presiding over Taputapuatea marae at Rangiatea in French Polynesia.

The son of Ohomairangi, Muturangi was an accomplished navigator who started the tradition of the High Priest at Taputapuatea. He was responsible for collecting and recording knowledge of deep-sea voyaging across the Pacific Ocean.

Muturangi supposedly had as a familiar or kaitiaki (guardian spirit), a giant octopus known as Te Wheke-a-Muturangi ('the Octopus of Muturangi'), the same octopus which others were said to have followed to reach New Zealand.

Another theory for Te Wheke-a-Muturangi states that the name actually refers to the many navigation paths centred on Ra'iātea with the tentacles reaching out across the pacific (Tetahiotupa 2009).
