= Ngāti Maru (Taranaki) =

- Iwi (tribe) in Māoridom
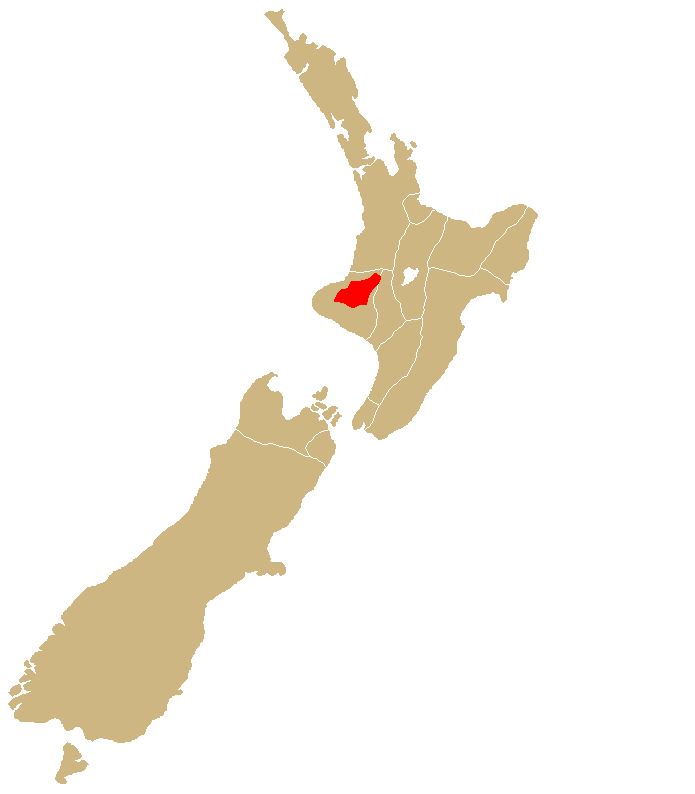
- Rohe (region): Taranaki
- Waka (canoe): Aotea, Tokomaru, Tainui
- Website: ngatimaru.co.nz

Ngāti Maru or Te Iwi o Maruwharanui is a Māori iwi of inland Taranaki in New Zealand. They are descended from Maruwharanui, the eldest son of Pito Haranui and his wife Manauea. Pito Haranui belonged to an ancient Taranaki people known as the Kāhui-Maru, whose genealogy predates the arrival of Toi.

The main hapu of Ngāti Maru (which also comprise smaller sections) are Ngāti Hinemōkai (includes Ngāti Rongonui), Ngāti Kōpua (includes Ngāti Tamatāpui and Ngāriki) and Ngāti Kui (includes Ngāti Te Ika and Ngāti Tamakehu).

Te Upoko o te Whenua Marae is the iwi's marae at Tarata. Ngarongo is the name of the whare puni (meeting house) and the whare kai (dining hall) is named Maruwharanui.

== Ancestry ==
Maruwharanui had three siblings – a younger brother, Marukōpiri, who settled at Manganui-o-te-Ao, near Raetihi, and two sisters, Mihi-Rawhiti and Hinepango. It is surmised that Maruwharanui was contemporary with the arrival of the Hawaiki people in the 1300s. This is judged primarily by the marriages of his siblings to Hawaiki people. Marukopiri married Hineue, the daughter of the famed explorer Tamatea Pokai Whenua of the Tākitimu waka. Hinepango married Hotunuku, who arrived on the Tainui waka.

Ngāti Maru are primarily descendants of Maruwharanui's daughter Te Reimatia. She married Tamatea-Kopiri, the grandson of Turi, the commander of the Aotea waka. Tamatea-Kopiri was the first Aotea child born in Aotearoa and is considered the senior male line of the waka. Today, most of Ngāti Maru can trace their descent through one or more of the sons of Te Reimatia, the grandsons of Maruwharanui.

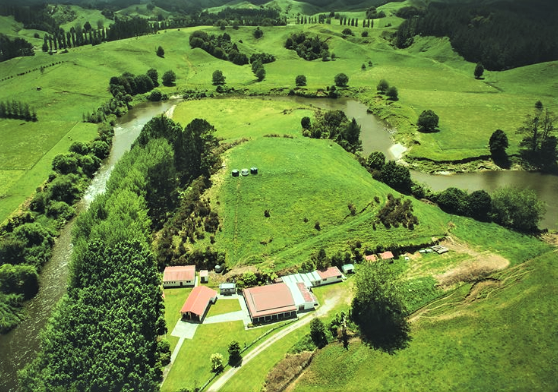
The marae at Tarata, on a bend of the upper Waitara River

== Iwi governance ==
Te Runanga o Ngati Maru (Taranaki) Trust was mandated by the tribe as its representative body to negotiate its historic Treaty grievances. Ngāti Maru signed an agreement in principle with the Crown in December 2017. The post-Treaty settlement governance entity will be Te Kahui Maru : Te Iwi o Maruwharanui Trust. Other representative bodies of the tribe will remain in their roles. Ngati Maru Wharanui Pukehou Trust is responsible for the marae reservation and buildings. Ngati Maru (Taranaki) Fisheries Trust currently administers the funds derived from Ngāti Maru's fishing quota. The settlement of Purangi is within their area.

== See also ==
- List of Māori iwi
