= Matahourua =

Canoe of the legendary hero Kupe

- Great Māori migration waka

In Māori tradition, Matahourua was the canoe of the legendary hero Kupe, who, in some accounts, was the discoverer of Aotearoa (New Zealand)

== See also ==
- List of Māori waka
