= List of marae in Canterbury Region =

This is a list of marae (Māori meeting grounds) in Canterbury, New Zealand.

In October 2020, the Government committed $160,440 through the Provincial Growth Fund to upgrade two marae in the region, with the intention of creating 30 jobs.

== Kaikoura District ==
Marae name	Wharenui name	Iwi and hapū	Location
Takahanga	Maru Kaitatea	Ngāi Tahu (Te Rūnanga o Kaikōura)	Kaikōura
Mangamaunu	Hohepa	Ngāi Tahu (Te Rūnanga o Kaikōura)	Kaikōura

== Waimakariri District ==
Marae name	Wharenui name	Iwi and hapū	Location
Tuahiwi Marae	Māhunui II	Ngāi Tahu (Te Ngāi o Tūāhuriri Rūnanga)	Tuahiwi

== Christchurch City ==
Marae name	Wharenui name	Iwi and hapū	Location
Rehua	Te Whatu Manawa Māoritanga o Rehua		St Albans
Ngā Hau e Whā National Marae	Aoraki	All Nations (Te Rūnanga o Nga Maata Waka)	Wainoni
Rāpaki Marae / Te Wheke	Wheke	Ngāi Tahu (Te Hapū o Ngāti Wheke)	Te Rāpaki-o-Te Rakiwhakaputa
Koukourarata	Tūtehuarewa	Ngāi Tahu (Te Rūnanga o Koukourarata)	Port Levy
Wairewa	Te Mako	Ngāi Tahu (Wairewa Rūnanga)	Little River
Ōnuku	Karaweko	Ngāi Tahu (Ōnuku Rūnanga)	Akaroa

== Selwyn District ==
Marae name	Wharenui name	Iwi and hapū	Location
Ngāti Moki	Ngāti Moki	Ngāi Tahu (Te Taumutu Rūnanga)	Southbridge

== Ashburton District ==
Marae name	Wharenui name	Iwi and hapū	Location
Hakatere Marae	Hakatere	Ngāi Tahu	Fairton

== Timaru District ==
Marae name	Wharenui name	Iwi and hapū	Location
Arowhenua	Te Hapa o Niu Tireni	Ngāi Tahu (Te Rūnanga o Arowhenua)	Temuka
Te Aitarakihi	Te Whare Whakapiripiri Tuhono A Iwi	All Nations (Te Rūnanga o Nga Maata Waka)	Timaru

== Waimate District ==
Marae name	Wharenui name	Iwi and hapū	Location
Waihao	Waimate Centennial Memorial Hall	Ngāi Tahu (Te Rūnanga o Waihao)	Waimate

== See also ==
- Lists of marae in New Zealand
- List of marae in the Chatham Islands
- List of schools in Canterbury, New Zealand
