= List of marae in the Chatham Islands =

This is a list of marae (Māori and Moriori meeting grounds) in the Chatham Islands in New Zealand.

In October 2020, the Government committed $160,440 through the Provincial Growth Fund to upgrade Whakamaharatanga Marae, with the intention of creating six jobs.

== List of marae ==
Marae name	Wharenui name	Iwi and hapū	Location
Kopinga	Hokomenetai	Moriori	Waitangi
Whakamaharatanga	Whakamaharatanga	Ngāti Mutunga (Ngāti Mutunga o Wharekauri)	Te One

== See also ==
- Lists of marae in New Zealand
- List of marae in Canterbury, New Zealand
- List of schools in the Chatham Islands
