= Taumata (disambiguation) =

Taumata may refer to

- Taumata, a surname
- Taumata, a short name for Taumatawhakatangihangakoauauotamateaturipukakapikimaungahoronukupokaiwhenuakitanatahu, the longest place name on Earth.

== See also ==
- Tamatea (disambiguation).
