= List of historic places in the Chatham Islands =

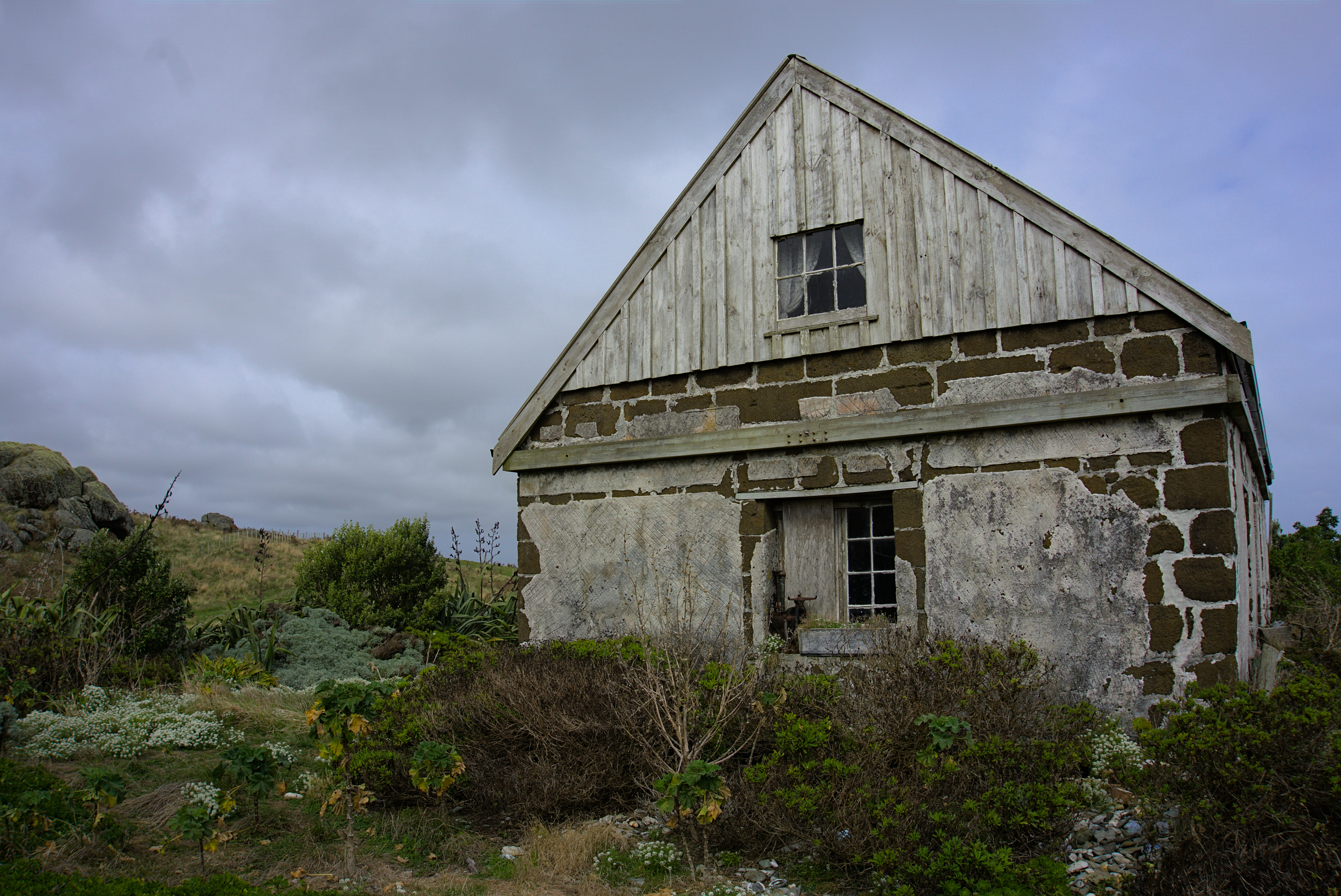
The German Mission House, a Category 1 Historic Place in Waitangi West, Chatham

Registered historic buildings in the Chatham Islands, New Zealand, primarily comprise houses and cottages constructed in the late 19th century, following the construction of Hough Cottage (the earliest surviving building on the islands) c. 1860.

Ten locations in the Chatham Islands are listed on the New Zealand Heritage List. Nine are located on the main island of Chatham, while one, Whaler's Cottage, is on neighboring Pitt Island. Two additional sites – Hunts Forge on Pitt Island and Zimmerman House at Waitangi West on Chatham – were initially listed, but were later destroyed.

The Chatham Islands are an archipelago in the Pacific Ocean about 800 km (430 nmi) east of New Zealand's South Island, administered as part of New Zealand. The first human inhabitants, the Moriori, suffered disease outbreaks from European contact beginning around 1800, as well as invasion, genocide, and enslavement in 1835 by the Māori of two iwi from Taranaki. Māori steadily returned to Taranaki over the 1860s, leasing land on the islands to Pākehā herders, who settled and constructed sheep stations on the islands.

Heritage New Zealand classification of sites on the New Zealand Heritage List / Rārangi Kōrero, in accordance with the Heritage New Zealand Pouhere Taonga Act 2014, distinguishes between Category 1 ("places of special or outstanding historical or cultural significance") and Category 2 ("places of historic or cultural significance"). Sites important to Māori or Moriori communities are given special classifications, including Wāhi Tapu for sites of spiritual, traditional, or ritual importance.

== Extant sites ==
List of historic places in the Chatham Islands
Name	Classification	Location	Constructed	Registered	Type	List number	Notes	Image	Citation
Hough Cottage	Category 2	Waitangi, Chatham	c. 1860	1991	House	5387	A cottage built around 1860, thought to be oldest surviving building in the Chatham Islands.		
German Mission House	Category 1	Waitangi West, Chatham	1866–1868	1991	House	5401	A cottage built of local wood and stone by Johannes Engst and Johann Baucke, Moravian missionaries to the Chathams who had arrived in 1843, and Baucke's son William.	A photo of the German Mission House and its surrounding garden	
Ponga Whare	Category 1	Wharekauri Station, Chatham	1867	1992	House	5399	A temporary residence constructed by Hauhau Māori convict laborers for station owner William Chudleigh. Built from timber and ponga logs, originally with a thatched roof, although it is now corrugated iron.		
Whaler's Cottage	Category 2	Glory Bay, Pitt Island	1869	1991	House	5386	A largely unaltered timber cottage built in the late 1860s by William Gordon Jacobs at the behest of Frederick Hunt. Briefly served as accommodation for visiting whaler crews on Pitt Island.		
Meikle House	Category 2	Te One, Chatham	c. 1870	1991	House	5397	A house initially owned by D. H. Meikle, an American whaler and smuggler. Various additions have been made since its construction shortly after 1870.		
Whangamarino Woolshed	Category 2	Waitangi Wharf-Owenga Rd., Chatham	1870	1991	Woolshed	5396	One of the two oldest woolsheds on Chatham Island still in use. Built in 1870 by F. Cox and Alexander Shand from local timber.		
Nairn House	Category 1	Waitangi, Chatham	1882–1886	1991	House	5400	A two-storey colonial house built by William Baucke for Walter Hood, a prominent local trader and farmer. Described as the "most notable and historic building" in Waitangi by Heritage New Zealand. Fashioned from kauri timber with a corrugated iron roof. Served as accommodation for visiting dignitaries.		
St Augustine's Church (Anglican)	Category 2	Te One, Chatham	1885	1991	Church	5389	An Anglican church in Te One. Its construction was sponsored by various locally prominent families, including the station-owners Chadleigh and Raynor. The interior of the church includes kauri paneling and lining.	A black and white photo of a small church, surrounded by a hedgerow and picket fence	
Solomon Homestead	Category 1	Manukau, Chatham	1903–1916	1991	House	5395	A hipped-roof villa with corrugated iron roof and walls, some kauri framing, and internal lining of scrim and paper. Construction started by Rangitapua Horomona Pehe in 1903, and finished by Tommy Solomon and his second wife in 1916. Served as Solomon's home until his death. Currently in dilapidated condition.		
Tommy Solomon Statue	Wāhi Tapu	Manukau, Chatham	1986	2009	Monument	9281	A statue of Tommy Solomon, the last full-blooded Moriori. Located at Manukau, a Moriori reserve and Solomon's resting place. It was commissioned in 1984 by the Solomon families, and dedicated in December 1986 by Prime Minister David Lange.		

== Former sites ==
These sites were formerly listed on the New Zealand Heritage List, but are no longer extant.

Former historic places in the Chatham Island
Name	Classification	Location	Constructed	Type	List number	Notes	Citation
Hunts Forge	Category 2	Flower Pot-Glory Rd., Pitt Island	1859	Forge	5388	Constructed by Frederick Hunt in 1859 using materials sourced from a shipwreck. Burnt down at some point between 2000 and 2004.	
Zimmerman House	Category 2	Waitangi West, Chatham	N/A	House	N/A	Demolished at some point between 1999 and 2010.	
