= List of marae in Otago =

This is a list of marae (Māori meeting grounds) in Otago.

== Dunedin City ==
| Marae name | Wharenui name | Iwi and hapū | Location |
|---|---|---|---|
| Āraiteuru | Te Paihere | urban marae established with the assent of Ōtākou, Moeraki and Huirapa marae | Wakari, Dunedin/Ōtepoti |
| Huirapa / Puketeraki | Huirapa | Ngāi Tahu (Kāti Huirapa Rūnaka Ki Puketeraki) | Karitāne |
| Ōtākou Marae | Tamatea | Ngāi Tahu (Te Rūnanga o Ōtākou) | Otakou |

== Waitaki District ==
| Marae name | Wharenui name | Iwi and hapū | Location |
|---|---|---|---|
| Moeraki Marae | Uenuku | Ngāi Tahu (Te Rūnanga o Moeraki) | Moeraki |

== See also ==
- Lists of marae in New Zealand
- List of schools in Otago
