= List of marae in the Tasman District =

This is a list of marae (Māori meeting grounds) in the Tasman District of New Zealand.

== List of marae ==
Marae name	Wharenui name	Iwi and hapū	Location
Onetahua Kōkiri	Te Ao Marama	Ngāti Rārua, Ngāti Tama ki Te Tau Ihu, Te Atiawa o Te Waka-a-Māui	Tākaka
Te Āwhina	Turangāpeke	Ngāti Rārua, Ngāti Tama ki Te Tau Ihu, Te Atiawa o Te Waka-a-Māui	Motueka

== See also ==
- Lists of marae in New Zealand
- List of marae in Nelson, New Zealand
- List of schools in the Tasman District
