= Fairton =

Fairton may refer to:

- Fairton, New Jersey, United States
- Fairton, New Zealand
