= Ngāti Ākarana =

Māori cultural club in Auckland, New Zealand

Ngāti Ākarana is a Māori cultural club in Auckland, New Zealand. It is a pan-tribal group of urban Māori who have migrated to Auckland, similar to the groups Ngāti Poneke in Wellington and Ngāti Rānana in London. "Ākarana" is a Māori-language approximation of the name Auckland.
