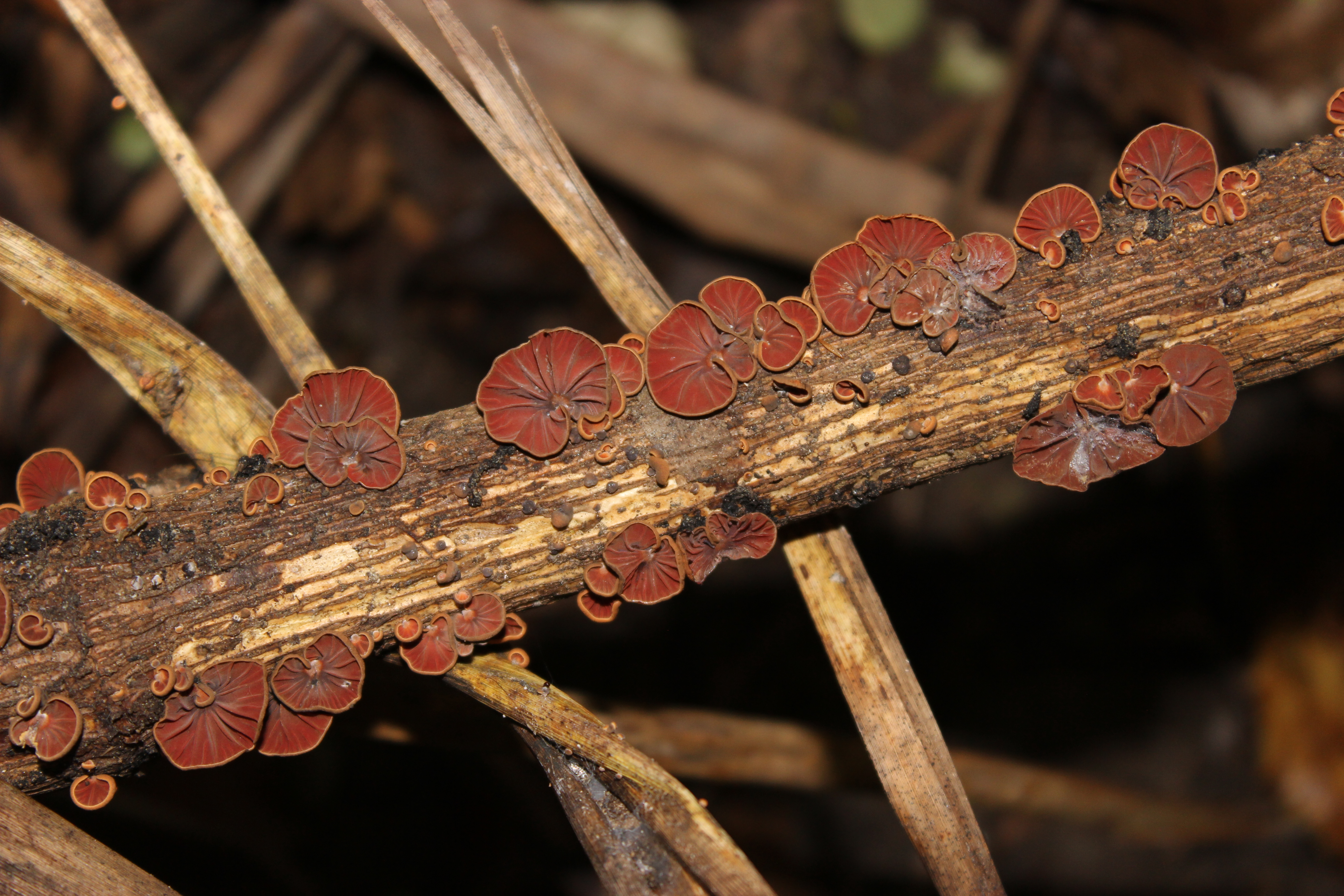
- Fruiting bodies

Scientific classification
- Kingdom: Fungi
- Division: Basidiomycota
- Class: Agaricomycetes
- Order: Agaricales
- Family: Omphalotaceae
- Genus: Anthracophyllum
- Species: A. archeri

Binomial name
- Anthracophyllum archeri (Berk.) Pegler (1965)

Synonyms
- Xerotus archeri Berk. (1860)

= Anthracophyllum archeri =

Orange fan

Species of fungus

Anthracophyllum archeri, commonly known as the orange fan, is a saprobic basidiomycete in the genus Anthracophyllum and the family Omphalotaceae. It is small and rust coloured, and grows in groups on rotting wood.

== Taxonomy ==
First described by Miles Joseph Berkeley in 1860 as Xerotus archeri, it was moved to the genus Anthracophyllum by David Pegler in 1965. The holotype was collected by Samuel N. Archer in Tasmania. The synonym Xerotus drummondii came about when Mordecai Cubitt Cooke described the species in the Handbook of Australian Fungi in 1892, which Pegler later stated to be synonymous with Anthracophyllum archeri in 1965, and reconfirmed in 1989.

== Description ==
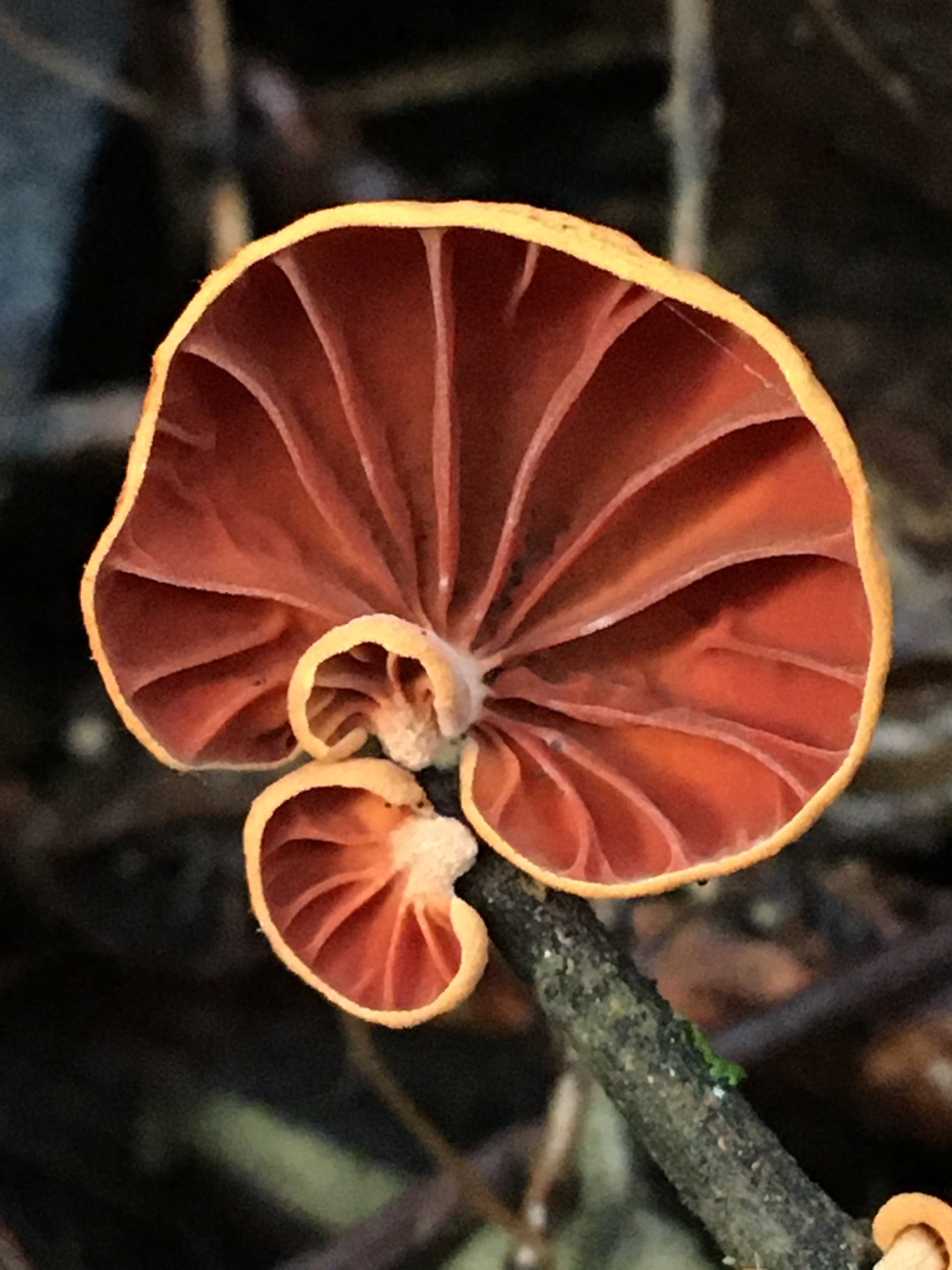
Underside/gills of fruiting bodies

Fruit bodies are rust coloured to dark red, and are fan shaped. They grow in groups on dead twigs. Caps are on average 3–20 mm (0.1–0.8 in) diameter. Horizontal caps are attached laterally to substrate and are sessile with a very small thickened stem like point. Shapes range from reniform to almost circular, convex, and almost symmetrical, deeply grooved radiating from point of attachment, following gill outline Pileus is coloured creamy pale pink to reddish brown, and smooth, when young covered in scaly whitish dust. Gills are orange to brown, widely spaced, and radiating from the pale, thickened point of attachment to the substrate. Spores are translucent, 7.5–12.5 μm long, and 5–8 μm wide, with a white spore print. Context is 1–2 mm (0.04–0.08 in) thick, and pale with a thickened wall.

== Ecology ==
Anthracophyllum archeri grows on dead wood, such as fallen twigs, branches, and stumps, mostly those of angiosperms. The species is common in rainforests in both Australia, and New Zealand, and wet and dry sclerophyll forests. It is a saprotrophic fungus, which means it gets its food by breaking down dead organic material.

== Habitat and distribution ==
The fungus is found in native forests throughout New Zealand, and in Australia on the East Coast, Tasmania, and South West point of Western Australia. The fungus has also been observed on Lord Howe Island, Raoul Island and Te One.

== Similar species ==
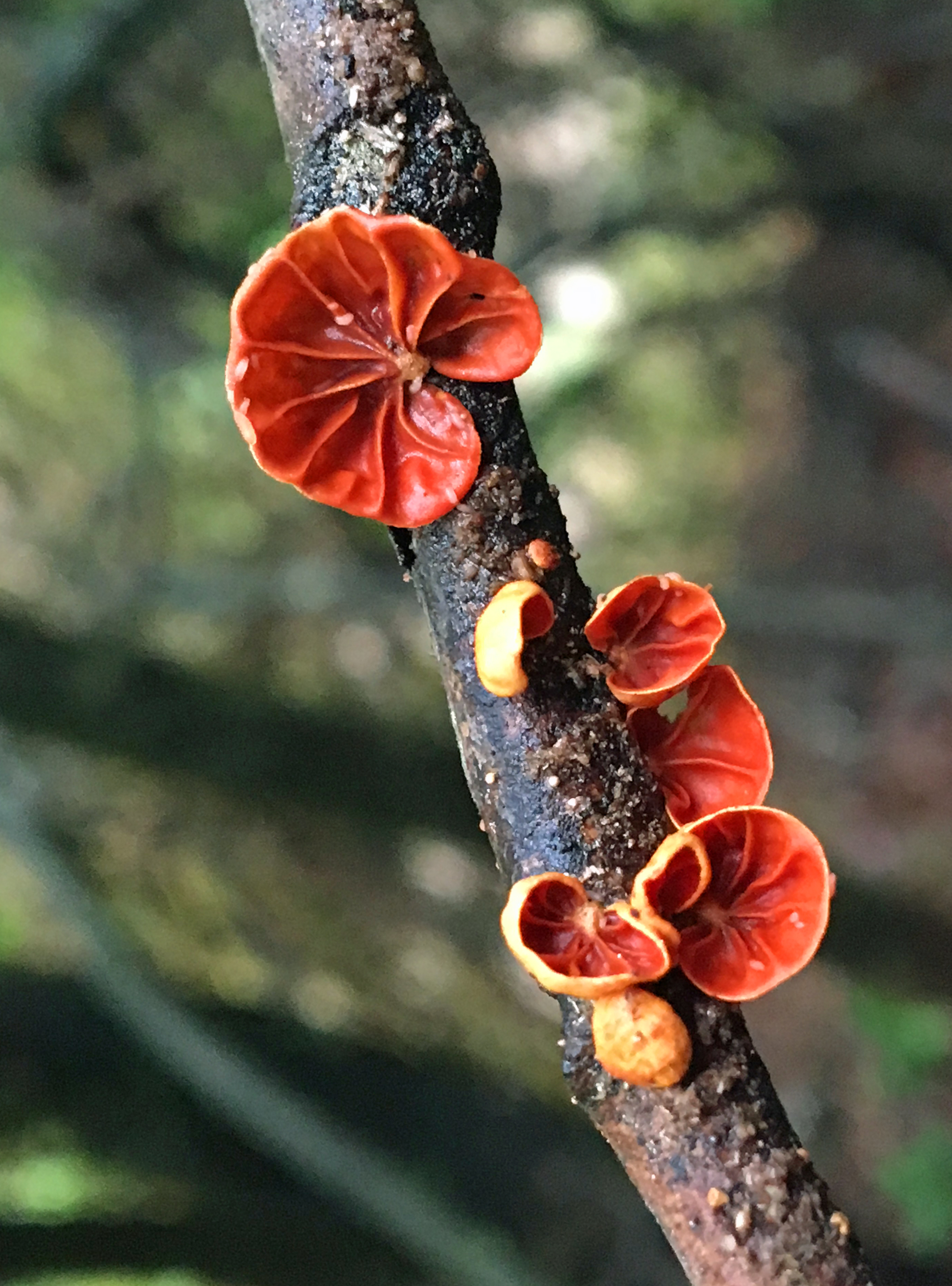
A. discolor

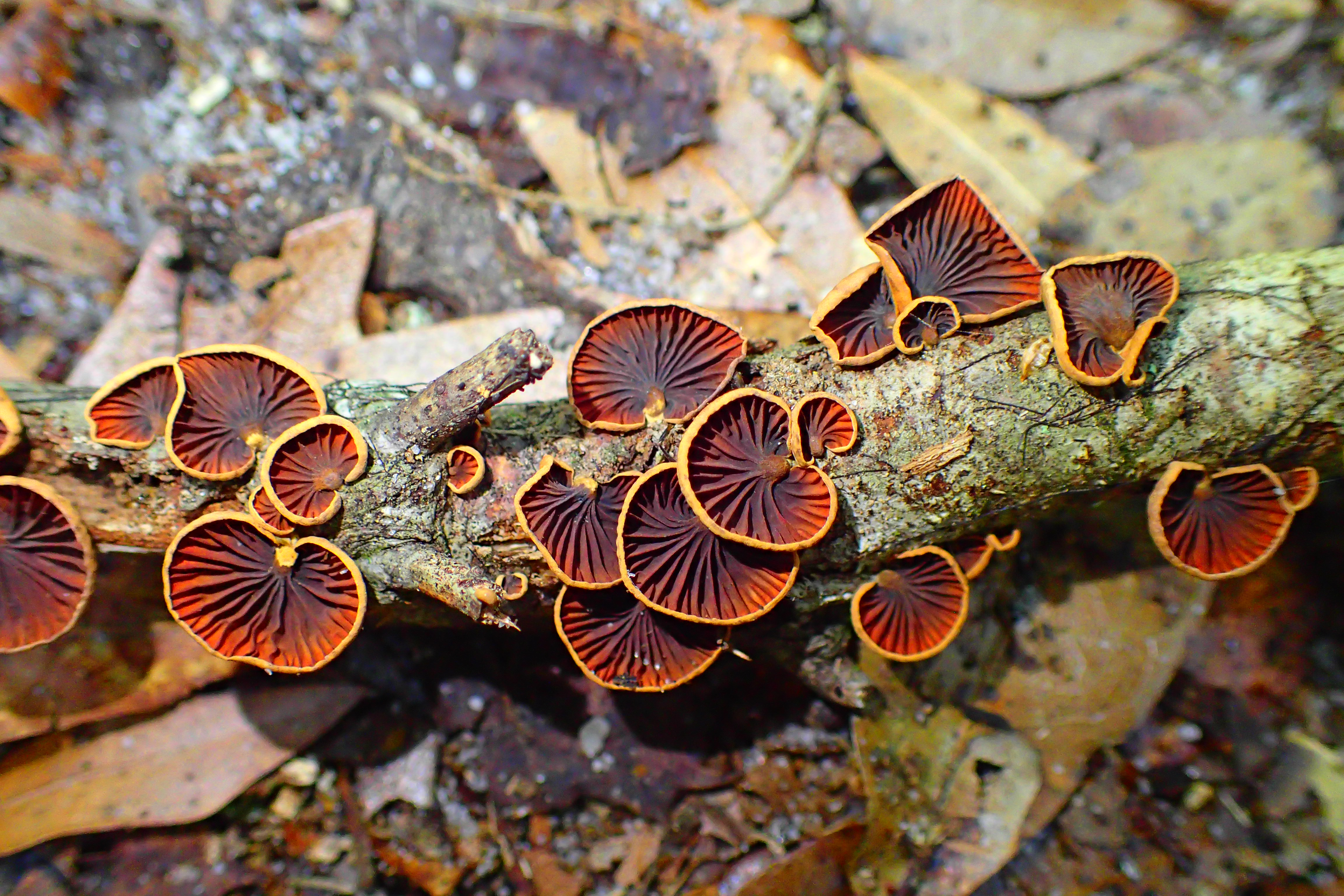
A. lateritium

Other species in the genus Anthracophyllum, including A. discolor and A. lateritium. The spores of Anthracophyllum archeri are larger than those of A. discolor, and A. lateritium is described as darker in colour, with more gills.

== Uses ==
Anthracophyllum archeri contains diacetylatromentin, a multi use pharmaceutical, which can be isolated from its fruiting bodies. It also contains the yellow pigment anthracophyllin.
