= Ngāti Pōneke =

Ngāti Pōneke is the name adopted by urban Māori of diverse whakapapa living in Wellington City in the early 1900s.

‘’Wellington City’’ has no direct equivalent in te reo Māori. Prior to colonial settlement, pā and papakāinga were located throughout the region of Te Upoko o te Ika but not exactly where population centres are now. “Hapu from Taranaki moved to Te Whanganu-a-Tara (Wellington and Hutt Valley regions) in a series of excursions and migrations dating from approximately 1817. When William Wakefield arrived in Wellington Harbour in 1839 the Taranaki hapu (primarily Te Ātiawa, Taranaki, Ngāti Tama and Ngāti Ruanui) were settled around the inner Harbour, extending into the outer Harbour, Hutt Valley and South coast regions.” At that time, the colonial settlers referred to the harbour as Port Nicholson, while the name used by Te Atiawa was Te Whanganui-a-Tara.

Meanwhile, the New Zealand Company planned for a city named Wellington to be established in the area now known as Hutt Valley. Upon arrival in 1839, the more sheltered site to the south was preferred and the settlement was relocated to the Capital’s current location.

As the colonial nation grew, displaced Māori looking for employment moved to cities from around the motu/country. After the Second World War, a strong sense of whanaungatanga among urban Māori from disparate iwi led to the self-identification of quasi-iwi community groups that survive to this day. Sir Āpirana Ngata was instrumental in the creation of Ngāti Pōneke as one such in Wellington City, using the local colloquial te reo Māori name for the city as the unifying designation.

Te-Whanganui-a-Tara and Pōneke are both used as names for Wellington City. The first recognises Te Atiawa as mana whenua, where mana whenua loosely translates as those with responsibility for the well-being of the land. The second honours the pan-iwi community of urban Māori whose shared sense of Māori-ness led to the creation of the new local iwi, Ngāti Pōneke.

The word "Pōneke" is often attributed to a transliteration of Port Nicholson. Another possible origin is the Māori phrase pō nekeneke meaning ‘’to creep in the night’’, referring to the nighttime movement of Te Atiawa through the original wetland landscape.

Ngāti Pōneke Young Māori Club is an Urban Māori cultural club that was formed in Wellington, New Zealand, in 1937. It is a pan-tribal group of Māori who reside in Wellington (like Ngāti Ākarana in Auckland and Ngāti Rānana in London).
