= Waipounamu Māori =

Collective of Māori iwi in the South Island of New Zealand

Waipounamu Māori are a group of Māori iwi at or around the South Island of New Zealand. It includes the iwi (tribe) of Ngāi Tahu and the historical iwi of Kāti Māmoe and Waitaha, who occupy the island except for its most northern districts. It also includes Te Tau Ihu Māori (upper South Island Māori) iwi, such as Ngāti Toa, Te Atiawa o Te Waka-a-Māui, Ngāti Apa ki te Rā Tō, Rangitāne, Ngāti Kuia, Ngāti Rārua, Ngāti Kōata and Ngāti Tama.

Many iwi, like Ngāti Toa and Ngāti Tama, also have traditional tribal lands in the North Island.

The name Te Waipounamu for the South Island originates from Ngāi Tahu, the principal Māori iwi (tribe) of the southern region of New Zealand, who utilised the very hard greenstone (jade) to make adzes and other implements, as well as ornaments. Particularly valued was a paler nephrite which the Māori called inanga, gathered in a remote area near what is now called the Dart Valley. Māori named the district wāhi pounamu, meaning "place of greenstone", and the South Island came to be called Te Wāhi Pounamu. This somehow evolved into Te Wai Pounamu which means "the water(s) of greenstone" but bears no relation to the original meaning.
