= List of marae in Nelson, New Zealand =

This is a list of marae (Māori meeting grounds) in Nelson, New Zealand.

== List of marae ==
Marae name	Wharenui name	Iwi and hapū	Location
Whakatū Marae	Kākāti	Ngāti Kōata, Ngāti Rārua, Ngāti Tama ki Te Tau Ihu, Ngāti Toa Rangatira, Te Atiawa o Te Waka-a-Māui	Atawhai

== See also ==
- Lists of marae in New Zealand
- List of marae in the Tasman District
- List of schools in Nelson, New Zealand
