= Rehua marae =

Marae in Christchurch, New Zealand

Te Whatu Manawa Māoritanga o Rehua
- Marae
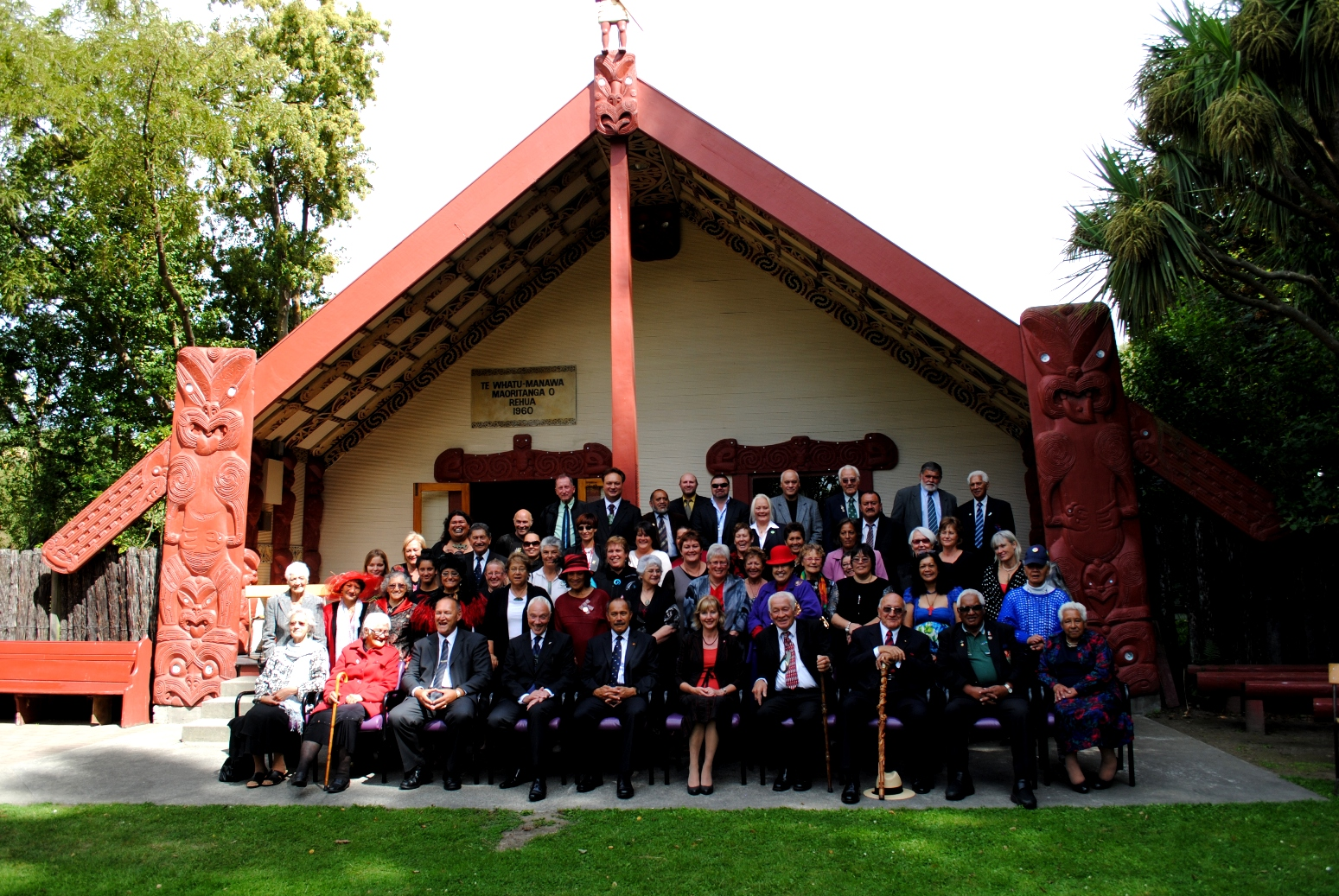
- A group in front of the meeting house during a visit by Governor-General Sir Jerry Mateparae in 2012
- Interactive map of Te Whatu Manawa Māoritanga o Rehua
- Coordinates: 43.5166°S 172.6321°E
- Location: St Albans, Christchurch, New Zealand
- Opened: 3 December 1960
- Whare Tīpuna: Te Whatu Manawa Māoritanga o Rehua (opened December 1960)
- Wharekai: Te Hemo i te Raki (opened February 1980)

Rehua is a marae in the suburb of St Albans in Christchurch. The marae began life as a Methodist mission training hostel for urban Māori during the middle part of the 20th century, but later evolved into a marae. It is one of the major Māori cultural centres in Christchurch.

== History ==
=== Methodist hostel ===
During the early colonisation of Christchurch, Methodist missionaries engaged with Canterbury Māori to spread Christianity. As part of this work, education in literacy and work training was considered a key role of the mission. To this end, during the first half of the 20th century, the Methodist church established hostels around the country to provide accommodation, social support and education for Māori.

After World War II, the Christchurch Methodist Central Mission chose to establish a hostel for young Māori women, to provide a "healthy Christian environment" for them, rather than leaving them to find "undesirable" accommodation. At the time, Māori from rural communities were migrating in large numbers to major cities, in search of work. Between 1951 and 1955 the Māori population of Christchurch increased by 326 people. Due to this national trend, in 1951 the government committed to a co-funding model to enable churches to build hostels for recent migrants.

Using the new government support, the Christchurch Methodist Central Mission purchased a property on Stanmore Road in Richmond to establish as a hostel. The Rehua Maori Girls' Hostel was opened in August 1952. The name was provided by Ngāi Tahu kaumatua Henare Te Ara Jacobs, of Tuahiwi. The name refers to the god of peace and plenty in the Māori mythological tradition. The girls' hostel was not particularly successful in early years, with many girls returning home, and many refusing to take part in the religious aspects of the facility. Thus in 1954 it was decided the hostel would be converted for male trade apprentices instead, as part of the Special Maori Affairs Trade Training Scheme.

The first male intake was 20 trainees, 18 of whom were from the North Island. In addition to accommodation, the boys were placed into apprenticeships across Christchurch in roles like carpentry, painting, electricians and mechanics. At this stage, Ngāi Tahu began to be involved in the scheme to ensure there were no cultural misunderstandings. Representatives from the five major Canterbury hapū formed a 'Council of Elders' that ensured that boys at the hostel were well-connected to Māori culture.

By the late 1950s it was becoming clear that due to its success, the hostel was outgrowing the small building on Stanmore Road. In late 1956, with help from the Department of Maori Affairs, the Methodist mission purchased a larger property on Springfield Road in St Albans. A larger hostel building was constructed, and opened in April 1957. By 1962, the new hostel was full too, with 45 residents.

=== Te Whatu Manawa Māoritanga o Rehua ===
Māori migrating to the cities became dislocated from not just their families, but also their culture. One of the intended benefits of the hostel schemes was that the residents would not only be educated in a trade, but would also be able to remain connected to their culture by living with other Māori. In the later half of the 20th century this crystallised into the "urban marae" movement, where marae were established in major urban centres to provide a cultural centre-point for the newly urbanised Māori.

In July 1959, a formal hui (meeting) at Rāpaki approved building a carved whare whakairo (carved meeting house) at Rehua. Rehua Council of Elders chairman Wera Couch explained that the initial idea of a recreational building with some carved panels "...grew into a desire to erect a building truly Maori; a Maori meeting house." The Methodist mission pledged £2,000, and other local businesses and charities also contributed to the project. The foundations were laid and blessed in August 1959. The building was to be named Te Whatu Manawa Māoritanga o Rehua.

Ngāti Whātua master carver Henare Toka and his wife, Wanairangi (Mere/Mary), were brought down from Auckland to supervise the carving. Toka was an expert in Māori mythology, and had been taught traditional carving by his grandfather, Arapeta Paikea. The pou (posts) and epa (end posts) were made from tōtara donated by a farmer at Okains Bay. Under the supervision of Mere, the tukutuku for the interior was done by volunteers from Rāpaki, Wairewa (Little River, Banks Peninsula), Tuahiwi, the Workers' Educational Association, the Māori Club of the Christchurch Training College, and the Burwood Training Centre. Material for the tukutuku came from all over the country, including New Brighton, the West Coast Region, Himatangi Beach, and Bulls.

The kōwhaiwhai (ornamental scroll pattern on the rafters) for the wharenui was developed from an ancient Kāti Māmoe rock drawing. The rock drawing was discovered at Shepherd's Creek on the Waitaki River. The pattern depicts an embryonic kiwi preparing to peck their way out of their egg.

In March 1960, a ceremony was held to lift the tapu from the site, and it was formally blessed. The carving continued for several months. The eastern and western wall carving depict the tīpuna (ancestors) of Ngāi Tahu, including Waitaha, Māmoe and Tahu. The northern and southern walls depict ancestors from Te Hiku o te Ika to Whanganui a Tara. The carvings were named after all of the captains of the major ancestral waka that Māori arrived on during their journey from Hawaiki. In this way, all the major tribes of New Zealand are represented in the wharenui, to signify the Methodist mission's work across all tribes and Christian denominations. The whare was the first carved meeting house to be opened in the South Island in over 100 years.

The marae was officially opened on 3 December 1960. The Māori King, Korokī, was too unwell to attend, so his daughter Piki Paki (later Queen Te Atairangikaahu), opened the marae in his stead. Government representatives that attended the second part of the opening ceremony included Prime Minister Walter Nash, John McAlpine, Eruera Tirikatene, and Michael Rotohiko Jones. Catering for 1,000 people was provided in two 57 metres (187 ft)-long marquee tents erected on a nearby tennis court. The food was prepared by volunteer New Zealand Army cooks from Burnham Military Camp, with local volunteers from Rehua putting down hāngī.

Even after the whare tīpuna (ancestral house) had opened, it was not considered to represent the establishment of an official "marae for Christchurch" by local Māori leaders. The fact that the land was owned by the Methodist mission, and that the training hostel was still operating on the location, meant that there was still a need for an "official" marae to be built in Christchurch. This work evolved into the establishment of a "National Marae" in Christchurch. A 1 acre (0.40 ha) plot of land adjacent to Rehua, which was previously a tennis club, was vested as a Māori Reserve in 1965 to allow for the expansion of Rehua into a national marae. Ultimately the location was considered unsuitable due to the size and issues with the title, and when land became available in Bromley, the Ngā Hau e Whā National Marae was built there instead. Because of this, the Christchurch City Council, with approval from the Māori Land Court, forcibly reacquired the reserve land in 1970. The council wanted to sell the land to a developer, to have it built into a block of flats.

In 1974, due to amendments to the law regarding Māori land, the opportunity arose to have the land on which the marae sat transferred to Māori ownership. The Methodist church relinquished their title to the land, and vested it as a Māori reserve. The bulk of the land was officially gazetted in October 1978. An additional block of adjacent land still owned by the Methodist mission was made a Māori reservation by the Māori Land Court in 1988, completing the transfer of the marae grounds to Māori.

=== Marae ===
In February 1980, the wharekai (dining hall) was opened behind the whare tīpuna. The plan for the wharekai began as early as 1965, with more concerted planning effort beginning in 1975. Funding came from a mixture of sources, including donations from old boys, the Christchurch City Council, central government, as well as iwi and Māori development charities. The final cost was around NZ$100,000. When it opened, this addition was hailed as finally "completing" Rehua as a proper marae. Dame Te Atairangikaahu, now the Māori Queen, returned to lift the tapu on the site, and officially open it. In November of that year, the marae hosted a "Three Nations" conference of Māori, Aboriginal Australians and Canadian First Nations peoples to discuss the unique challenges faced by indigenous people subjected to British colonialism. The wharekai was named Hemo-te-Raki by Riki Ellison, after the Ngāi Tahu tipuna (ancestor) who was the wife of principal tipuna Tahupōtiki.

The training hostel continued to operate into the 1980s. In 1982, the hostel celebrated its 30th anniversary. However, the abolition of the government trade training scheme, and the rise of polytechnics, meant that the hostel struggled to maintain numbers during the mid 1980s. By 1984 the hostel had begun scaling down.

As a marae and place of Christian worship, Rehua has hosted tangihanga (funerals), cultural events including the National Māori Speech Contest, and social and political conferences. The marae has a long relationship with the Maori Women's Welfare League, which has held conferences at the marae. The marae also has a relationship with the Rātana church since the 1980s.

In 1983, a kohanga reo (Māori language immersion school) opened on the marae. A preschool group had been operating as early as 1981, but it took a few years to become formally registered as part of the new kohanga reo movement. In 1987 the marae was described as "probably the busiest in the South Island".

A small building, Te Whare Manaaki, was built at the entrance of the marae in 1985 to provide a place for guests to wait before the pōwhiri. In 1986 a block of flats for kaumātua (elders) was opened at the back of the wharekai.
