= Linda Ngata =

New Zealand community leader

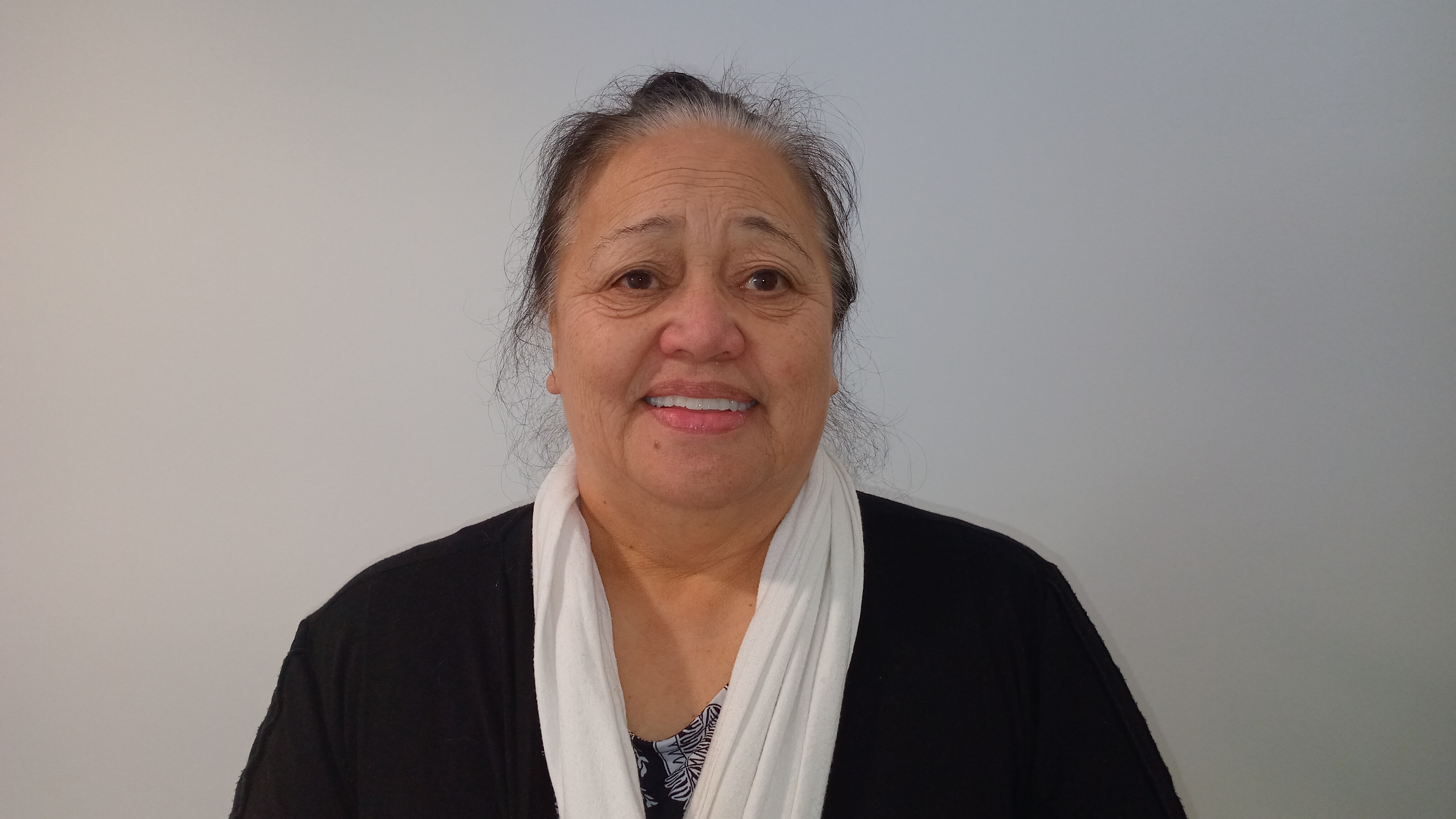
Linda Ngata

Linda Ngata (Ngāti Porou) is a manager and community leader based in Christchurch, New Zealand, specialising in education, training, welfare and community development, particularly of Māori people.

== Community leadership ==
Following the 2011 Christchurch earthquake, Ngata helped found the Earthquake Support Coordination Service in Christchurch, and set up a recovery assistance centre at the city's Ngā Hau e Whā National Marae.

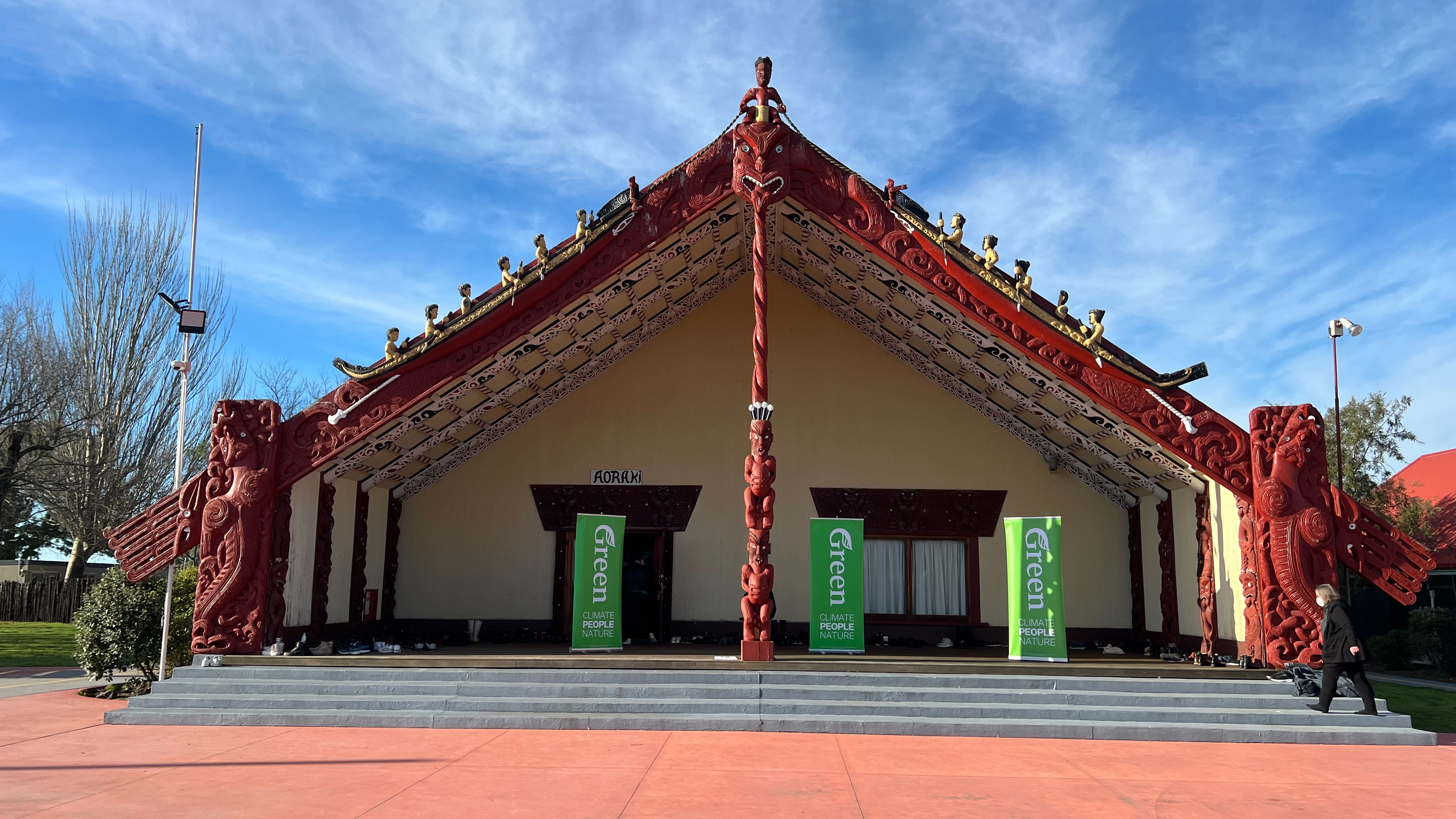
The wharenui at Ngā Hau e Whā National Marae, Christchurch, named Aoraki.

Ngata is the executive manager of Te Rūnanga o te Maata Waka, an urban Māori authority for Te Wai Pounamu headquartered at the marae.

During the COVID-19 pandemic, Ngata managed a vaccination centre at the marae.

Ngata is the current national trust chairperson (as of 2025) of Ngā Wātene Māori o Aotearoa-Māori Wardens of New Zealand.

== Honours ==
Ngata and her husband Norm Dewes were cited by the National Iwi Chairs Forum for "long-term commitment to their adopted home in Te Waipounamu, and of their regard for Ngāi Tahu as tangata whenua" and given a Te Whare Pūkenga award, which "recognises rangatira who have enhanced the lives of all whānau and who embody values including rangatiratanga, whanaungatanga, manaakitanga, kaitiakitanga, tikanga and pono."

Dewes and Ngata received the Pou Here Tangata award from Te Pūtea Whakatupu Trust, a fisheries asset management organisation.
