= German Mission House =

House on Chatham Island, New Zealand

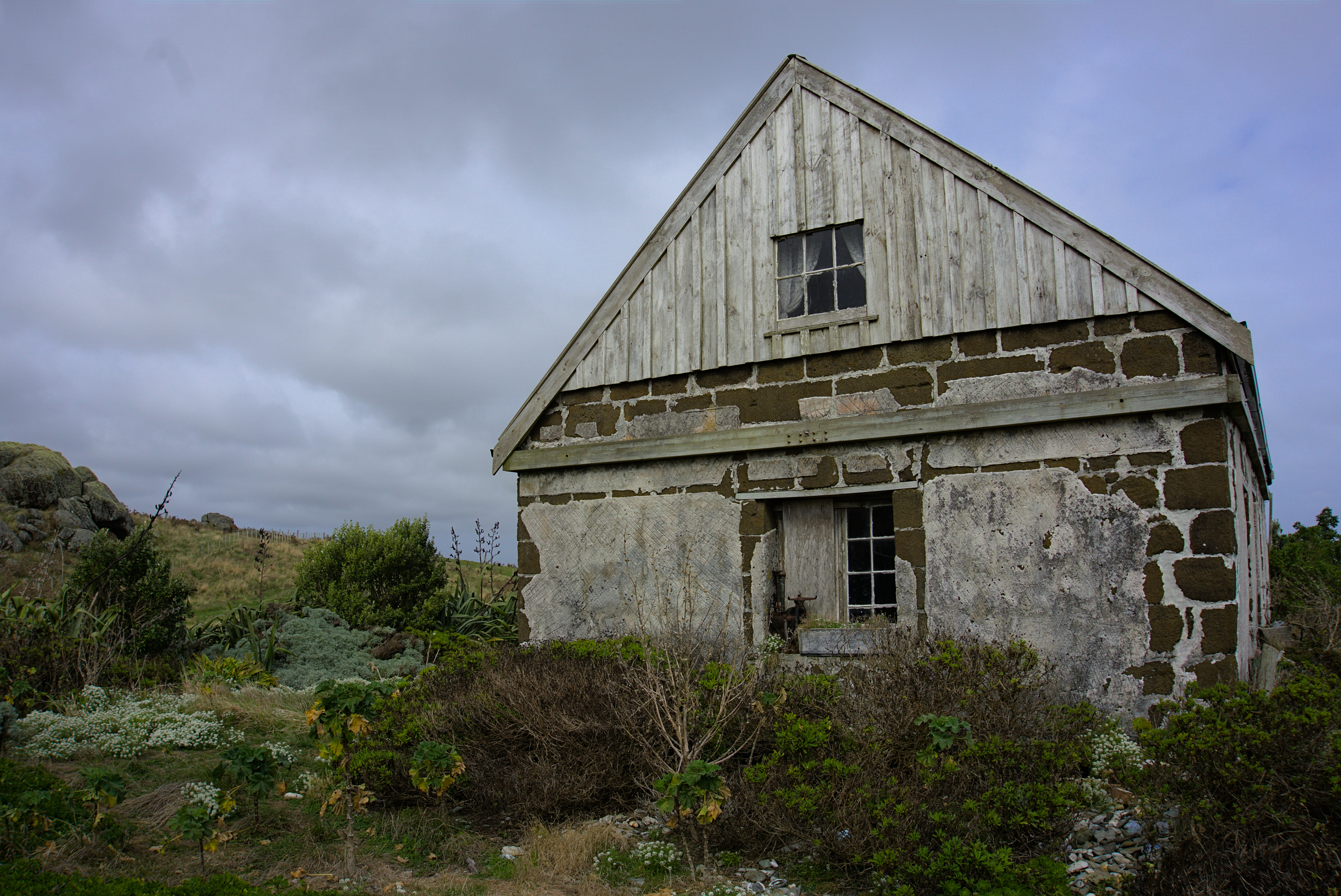

- Location within Chatham Islands
- Alternative names: Maunganui Stone Cottage

General information
- Type: House
- Location: Maunganui, Chatham Island, New Zealand
- Coordinates: 43.7644°S 176.7782°W
- Year built: 1866–1868

Design and construction
- Architects: Johannes Gottfried Engst; Johann Baucke

Heritage New Zealand – Category 1
- Designated: 11 November 1991
- Reference no.: 5401

The German Mission House (also known as the Maunganui Stone Cottage) is a 19th-century stone cottage at Maunganui on northern Chatham Island, New Zealand. Johannes Engst and Johann Baucke, members of a group of German Moravian missionaries, and Baucke's son William built the house in the late 1860s. The building was constructed from stone sourced from the nearby volcanic cone, Maunganui. The Moravian mission in the Chathams was broadly unsuccessful (failing to gain a single convert on the islands), and Engst alone stayed on the island, residing as a farmer at the house until his retirement in 1900. The house continues to serve as a private residence, although it is frequently visited by tourists to the islands. In 1991, it was listed as a Category 1 historic place by the New Zealand Historic Places Trust. Work was intermittently carried out on the structure from 1998 to 2010 to repair damage to masonry.

== History ==
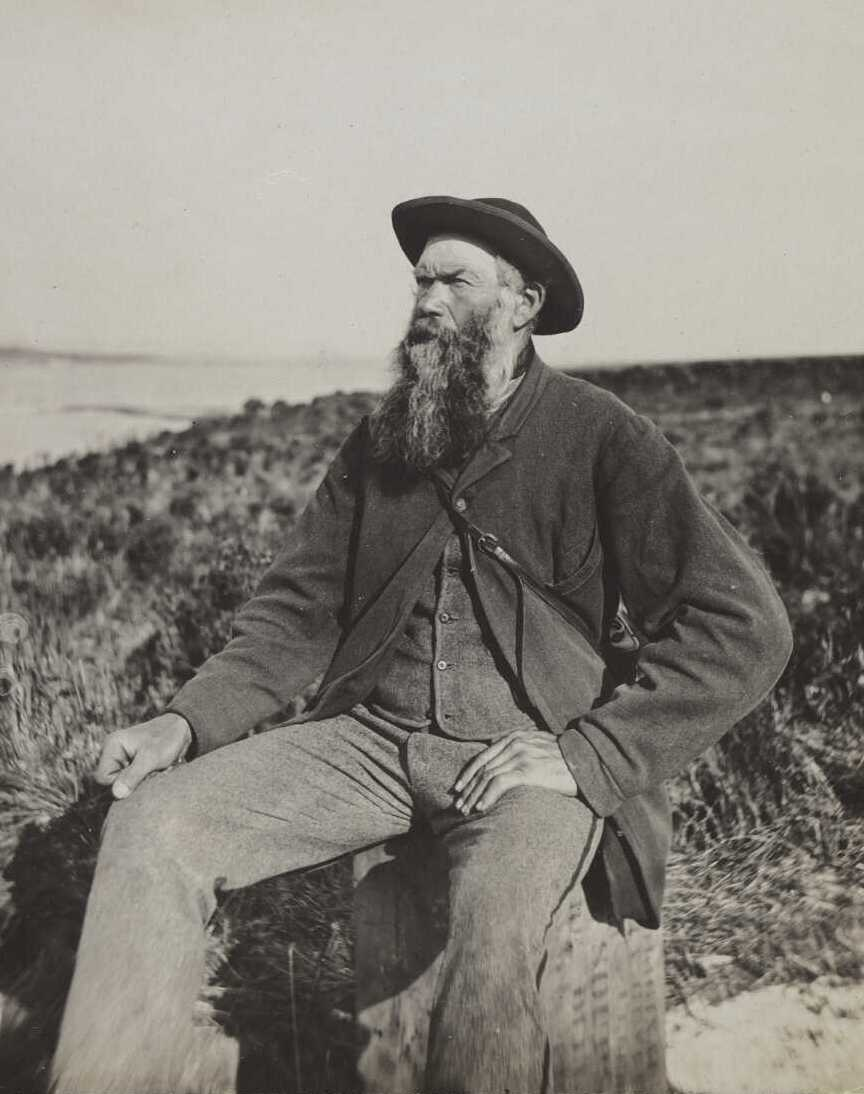
Johannes Engst, 1874

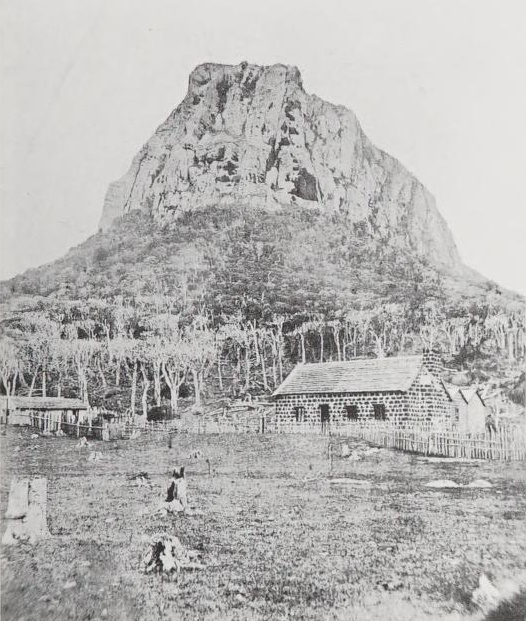
The house and surroundings during Engst's residence, 1870s

In 1842, five German Moravian Church missionaries, led by schoolmaster Franz Schirmeister, were sent to New Zealand by the Gossner Mission. Unable to find a suitable location to preach, they sailed to the Chatham Islands. They arrived in February 1843, initially settling at Te Whakaru on the main island of Chatham. Although ultimately failing to make any converts among either the Māori or Moriori inhabitants of the islands, they are credited with the introduction of shipbuilding and sheep farming, and established the island's first school.

All members of the mission lived apart for some time in order to connect with the local community. From 1866 to 1868 Johannes Gottfried Engst, Johann Baucke, and Baucke's son William (born on the island), constructed a stone cottage at Maunganui on the northern coast. The cottage was constructed with stone from the adjacent Volcanic Cone Maunganui, a 178 m (584 ft) volcanic cone, using mortar derived from pipi shells. The doors and window lintels of the house were made from akeake wood. In addition to sheepherding, the missionaries grew orchard trees, vegetables, and macrocarpa at the site. Several outbuildings, including a woolshed and stable, were constructed at the site, although only the Mission House is now extant.

Johann Baucke left the Chathams in the late 1860s, following the death of his wife and a feud over land with Archibald Shand. Engst continued to live and farm at the site, employing Baucke's children as labourers. Reverend P. C. Anderson visited the house in 1882, describing it as "a capital house... The blocks of which it is built are nearly a foot square, cut with the axe, so it must have involved an enormous amount of labour to build." Engst retired from farming in 1900, around eighty years old, and moved to Te One, where he died in 1910.

=== Modern history ===
The German Mission House remains a private residence. Various small improvements and additions have been added to the structure by its owners since its construction. It is frequently visited by tourists, although its remote location requires a half-day round trip by vehicle. The site holds great historical significance to Chatham Islanders. An entry fee and prior permission from the owners is required to visit the site.

== Structure ==
The German Mission House is rectangular, with a gable roof. Initially thatched, the modern roof is fashioned out of corrugated iron. The exterior stonework of the structure was initially exposed, but later plastered with lime. Early in its history, a veranda was installed on the building, but it has since been removed, leaving only a foundation line. Three bedrooms were placed inside the roof, accessible by a staircase on the western side of the house. These were initially lit on either end by windows in the western and eastern ends of the house; however, the eastern window has since been removed.

The building's ground floor is constructed from blocks of tuff and basalt, sourced from the western edge of the house. A stone-lined cellar was built at this spot. Timber floors are placed above this foundation. The building is split into three rooms, the middle the largest, each of which contains a casement window on the north side. The internal walls between these rooms are constructed from ponga logs, with plaster lining.

Modern interior fixtures for the kitchen and laundry have been installed in the house, alongside a modern bathroom in the eastern room. A lean-to was added in 1955. A possible earlier lean-to is evidenced by remaining stone foundations. Two chimneys, one on the southern wall and one on the western, were initially installed. The western chimney collapsed at some point before 2010.

=== Conservation and repairs ===
The house was listed as a Category 1 historic place by the New Zealand Historic Places Trust (NZHPT) on 11 November 1991. Historic structures on the Chatham Islands frequently face deterioration, exacerbated by a lack of skilled labour on the islands. Alison Dangerfield, a NZHPT architect, stated that due to this "Chatham Islanders generally cope with the lack of labour by not doing repairs".

A small team, consisting of a conservation architect, stonemason, and sculptor, repaired the stonework of the house over two weeks in 1998. Two years later, a new roof and steel cladding on the western wall were installed. A conservation plan for the building was drawn up in 2005. A NZHPT team, joined by a large number of local volunteers, carried out repair work on the house in April 2010, drilling tie rods into the masonry at ceiling level. The team also rebuilt a damaged wall with stone sourced from local environs.

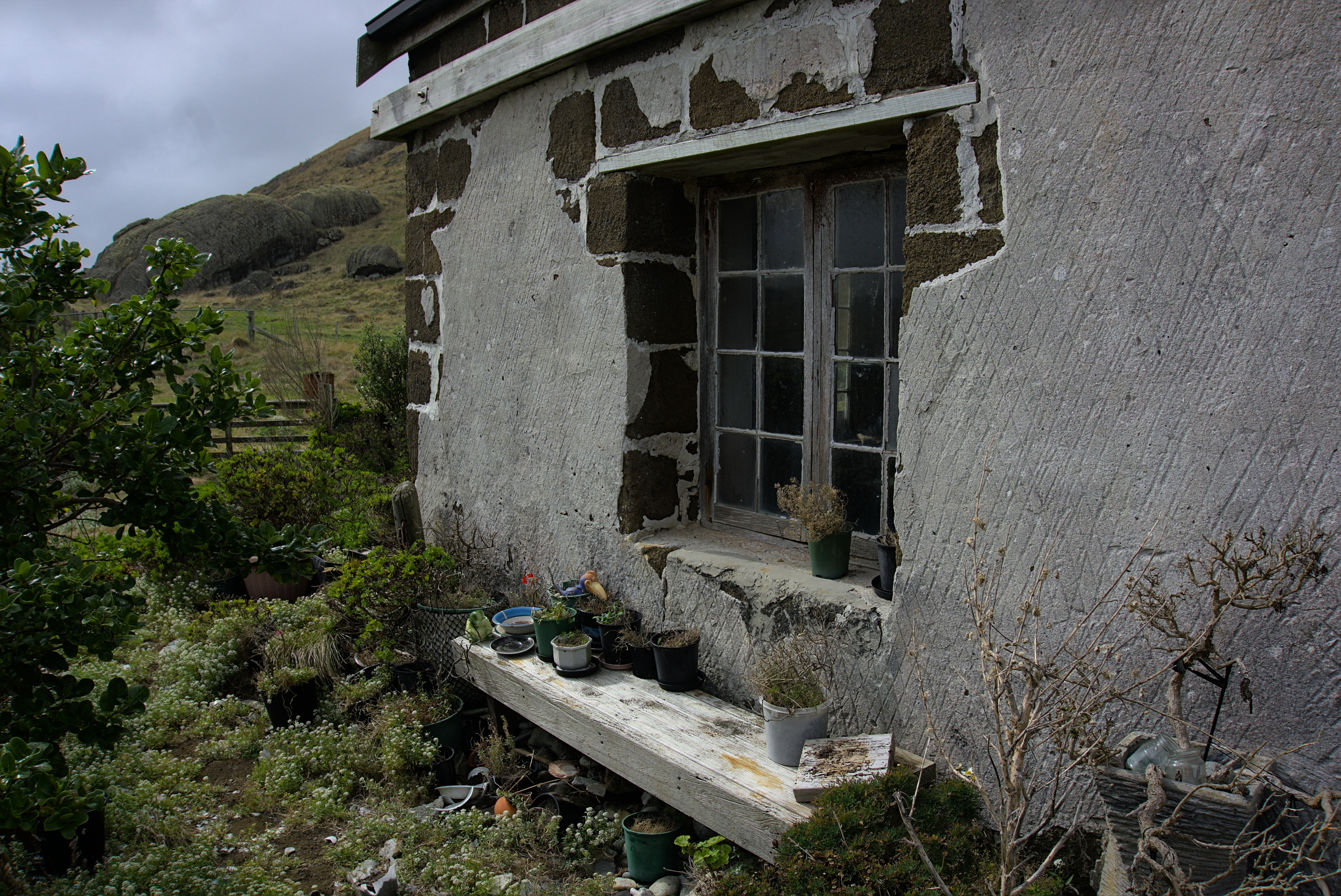
Window and garden of the house, 2023

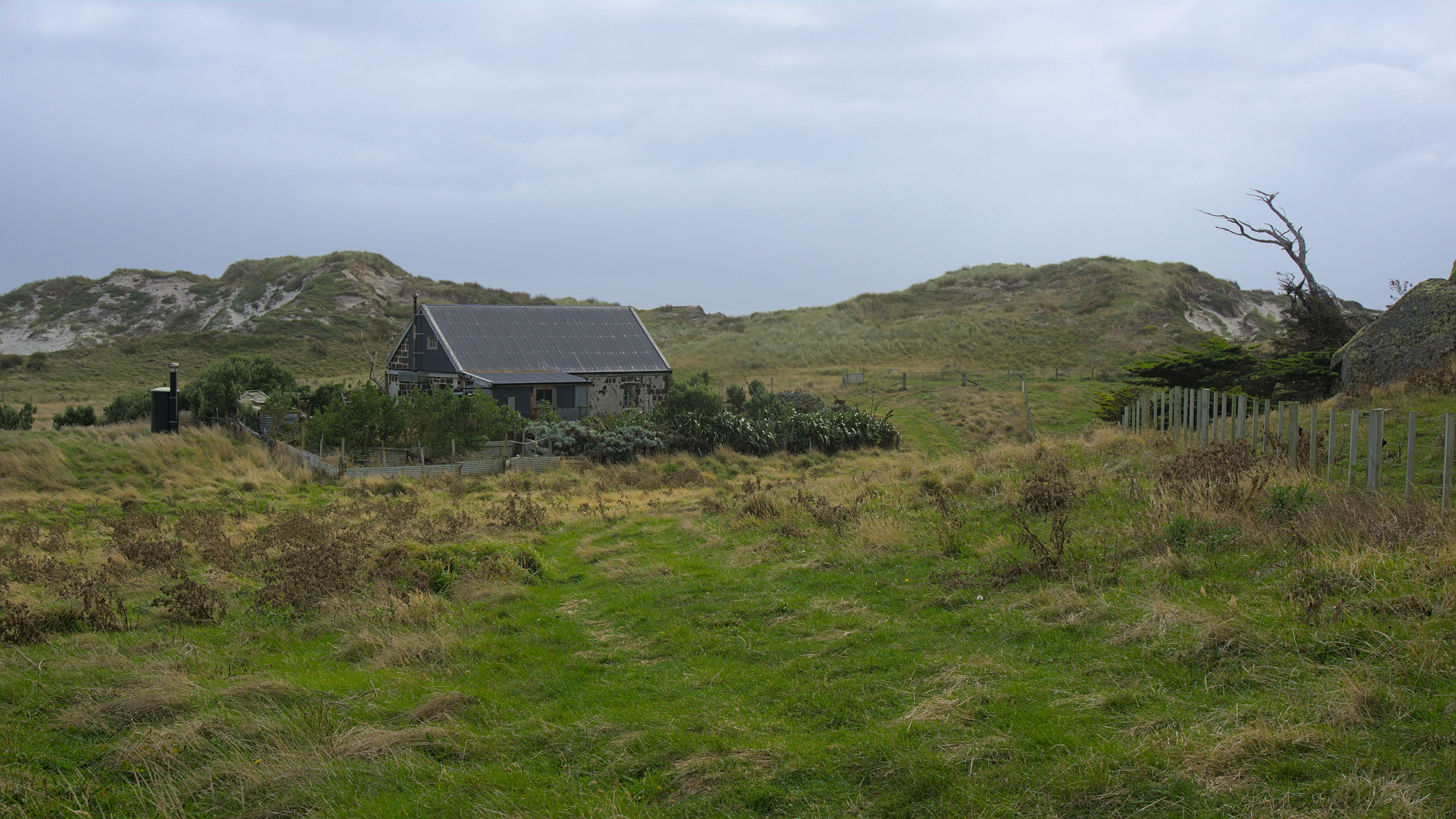
The house and surroundings, 2023

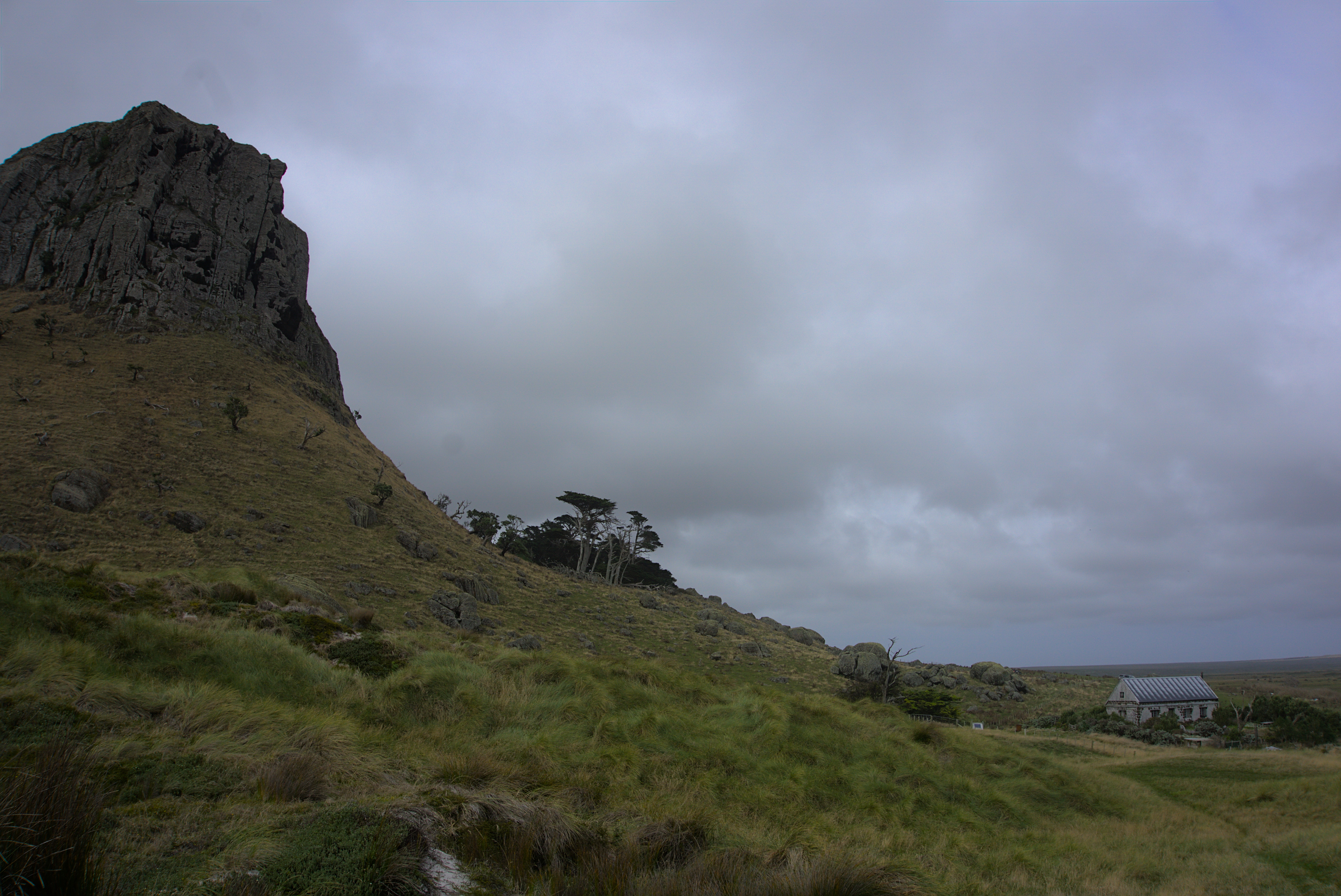
Maunganui with the house
