= Rahera Windsor =

Māori community leader in the United Kingdom

Rahera Windsor QSM
- Born: 13 March 1925; Pupuke, New Zealand
- Died: 3 May 2004 (aged 79); London, England

Rahera Windsor QSM (born Rahera Honi Heta; 13 March 1925 – 3 May 2004) was a kuia (female elder) of the Māori community in the United Kingdom, and one of the founding members of Ngāti Rānana.

== Biography ==
Windsor was born at Pupuke, near Kaeo, in Northland, New Zealand, in 1925. She left Northland for Auckland at an early age, and thereafter moved to the South Island where she worked as a land girl on a large farm north of the Waiau Uwha River. She married a British naval engineer in 1951, subsequently relocating to the United Kingdom.

Soon after her arrival in Britain, Windsor became actively involved in the celebration and promotion of Māori cultural and spiritual interests, and was a founding member of Ngāti Rānana. She led the club's concert party in cultural performances across Britain and Europe, and was also active in Te Kauri Māori Women's Welfare League, the Victoria League for Commonwealth Friendship, the Royal British Legion and the Commonwealth War Graves Commission.

Windsor died in London on 3 May 2004, at the age of 79.

== Honours and legacy ==
Windsor was the first Māori to be elected an honorary member of the New Zealand Society in London, and was recognised for her contributions to the development of the relationship between Ngāti Rānana and Ngāti Hinemihi. In the 1996 Queen's Birthday Honours, she was awarded the Queen's Service Medal for community service.

The Rahera Windsor Award for New Zealand Studies has been issued by the New Zealand Studies Association since April 2005, and is named in her honour.
