= List of marae in the West Coast Region =

This is a list of marae (Māori meeting grounds) in the West Coast, New Zealand.

In October 2020, the Government committed $248,376 from the Provincial Growth Fund to upgrade two marae in the region, with the intention of creating 20 jobs.

== Buller District ==
Marae name	Wharenui name	Iwi and hapū	Location
Te Taha o Te Awa	Te Taha o Te Awa	Ngāti Apa ki te Rā Tō (Pūaha Te Rangi)	Westport

== Westland District ==
Marae name	Wharenui name	Iwi and hapū	Location
Arahura Marae	Tūhuru	Ngāi Tahu (Kāti Waewae)	Hokitika
Te Tauraka Waka a Māui	Kaipō	Ngāi Tahu (Kāti Māhaki ki Makaawhio)	Bruce Bay

== See also ==
- Lists of marae in New Zealand
- List of schools in the West Coast, New Zealand
