= Lists of marae in New Zealand =

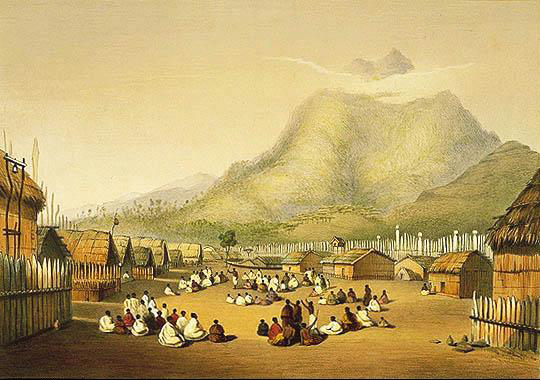
A marae at Kaitotehe, near Taupiri mountain, Waikato district, 1844. It was associated with Pōtatau Te Wherowhero, a chief who became the first Māori king.

The Māori people and Moriori people have 773 tribal marae (meeting grounds) around New Zealand. These grounds usually include a wharenui (meeting house) and are usually affiliated with iwi (tribes) and hapū (sub-tribes).

In Māori society, the marae is a place where the culture can be celebrated, where the Māori language can be spoken, where intertribal obligations can be met, where customs can be explored and debated, where family occasions such as birthdays can be held, and where important ceremonies, such as welcoming visitors or farewelling the dead (tangihanga), can be performed. Like the related institutions of old Polynesia, the marae is a wāhi tapu, a 'sacred place' that carries a great cultural significance.

In Māori usage, the marae ātea (often shortened to marae) is the open space in front of the wharenui (meeting house; literally "large building"). Generally, the term marae is used to refer to the whole complex, including the buildings and the ātea. This area is used for pōwhiri (welcome ceremonies) featuring oratory. Some iwi (tribes) and hapū (sub-tribes) do not allow women to perform oratory on their marae. The wharenui is the locale for important meetings, sleepovers, and craft and other cultural activities.

The wharekai (dining hall) is primarily used for communal meals, but other activities may be carried out there.

== Marae by region ==
=== North Island ===
- List of marae in the Auckland Region
- List of marae in the Bay of Plenty Region
- List of marae in the Gisborne Region
- List of marae in the Hawke's Bay Region
- List of marae in the Manawatū-Whanganui Region
- List of marae in the Northland Region
- List of marae in the Taranaki Region
- List of marae in the Waikato Region
- List of marae in the Wellington Region

=== South Island and other islands ===
- List of marae in the Canterbury Region
- List of marae in the Chatham Islands
- List of marae in the Marlborough Region
- List of marae in Nelson, New Zealand
- List of marae in the Otago Region
- List of marae in the Southland Region
- List of marae in the Tasman Region
- List of marae in the West Coast Region

== See also ==
- List of iwi
- List of Māori waka
- Lists of schools in New Zealand
