= List of schools in the Chatham Islands =

There are three small primary schools on the Chatham Islands, a New Zealand archipelago of about ten islands lying 800 kilometres (500 mi) to the east of Christchurch.

The rolls given here are those provided by the Ministry of Education, based on figures from July 2026.

Name	Years	Gender	Area	Authority	Decile	Roll	Website	MOE
Kaingaroa School	1–8	Coed	Kaingaroa	State	5	6		3387
Pitt Island School	1–8	Coed	Pitt Island	State	6	11		3476
Te One School	1–8	Coed	Te One	State	6	59		3553
