= New Zealanders in the United Kingdom =

Citizens or residents of the UK who originate from New Zealand

- Map of the New Zealander diaspora in the world.

Total population
- New Zealander-born residents in the United Kingdom: 53,688 (2021/22 Census) (Note: Does not include ethnic New Zealanders born in the United Kingdom or those with ancestry rooted in New Zealand); England: 47,842 (2021); Scotland: 3,883 (2022); Wales: 1,307 (2021); Northern Ireland: 656 (2021); Previous estimates: 62,584 (2011 Census); 59,000 (2015 ONS estimate)

Regions with significant populations
- Southern England, in particular Greater London

Languages
- English (New Zealand English and British English), Māori

Religion
- Predominantly Christianity, and other religion.

New Zealanders in the United Kingdom are citizens or residents of the United Kingdom who originate from New Zealand.

== Population ==
According to the 2001 UK Census, 58,286 New Zealand-born people were residing in the United Kingdom. The 2011 census recorded 57,076 people born in New Zealand residing in England, 1,292 in Wales, 3,632 in Scotland and 584 in Northern Ireland. The Office for National Statistics estimates that, in 2015, the New Zealand-born population of the UK stood at around 59,000.

Around 80 per cent of New Zealanders have some British ancestry and an estimated 17 per cent are entitled to British nationality by descent.

=== Distribution ===
Every one of the top ten most popular places in Britain for New Zealand expatriates is in London, Acton being home to 1,045 New Zealand-born people (representing 0.7 per cent of the local population), with Hammersmith, Brondesbury, Hyde Park, Cricklewood and Fulham following.

=== Māori ===
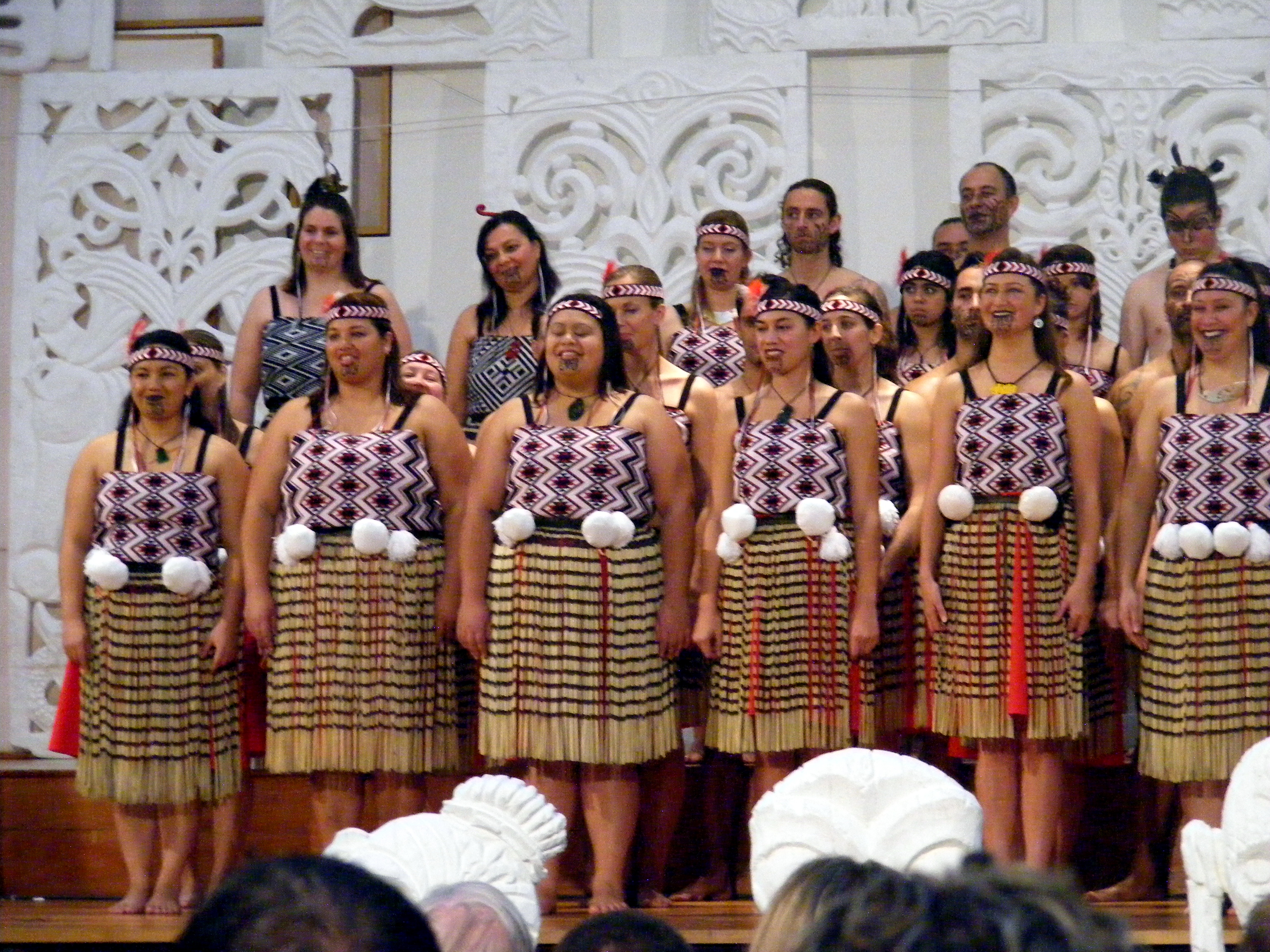
Christmas celebrations at London's Ngāti Rānana

According to Te Ara: The Encyclopedia of New Zealand, at the start of the millennium, approximately 8,000 Māori resided in England alone (as opposed to the United Kingdom as a whole). Historically Māori have been known in the UK for their athletic prowess on the rugby field as well as their various artistic skills. In the 1900s, Māori artistic performers toured the UK and some of them decided to stay. Mākereti (Maggie) Papakura of Whakarewarewa is one example of an early Māori immigrant who came to the country touring with a troupe of performers; she married in 1912 and lived in the UK for the rest of her life. During World War I, significant numbers of Māori troops came to the UK in order to help fight with the British Army (at this period military service was one of the main reasons for Māori emigration). Many of these were actually housed in Papakura's Oxfordshire mansion. Later on in the 1950s, a small group of Māori residing in the British capital established the London Māori Club. The aim was to promote Māori culture through the performance of traditional songs and war dances. In 1971 the group renamed itself Ngāti Rānana Māori Club. To this day the Ngāti Rānana cultural group hosts weekly meetings, language classes and celebrations.

== Notable New Zealanders in Britain ==
Academia and Science

- James Belich, historian
- Alan F. Blackwell, computer scientist
- Joanna Bourke, historian
- Amyas Connell, architect
- Malcolm Grant, President of University College London
- John Hood, former Vice-Chancellor of the University of Oxford
- William Phillips, economist
- Ernest Rutherford, physicist and Nobel Laureate
- Sydney Smith, forensic expert
- Maurice Wilkins, physicist and Nobel Laureate
- Glenn Wilson, psychologist
- Ngaire Woods, Dean of Blavatnik School Oxford University

Business

- Ross McEwan, Chief Executive RBS

Food

- Ross Burden, celebrity chef
- Mat Follas, winner of UK MasterChef 2009, Chef
- Monica Galetti, chef and Masterchef Judge
- Peter Gordon, chef

Medicine

- Harold Gillies, pioneering plastic surgeon
- Archibald McIndoe, pioneering plastic surgeon

Music and the Arts

- Daniel Bedingfield, singer
- Natasha Bedingfield, singer
- Sir Paul Beresford, politician
- Aidan Burley, politician
- Raymond Ching, painter
- Katherine Dienes, organist
- Bryan Gould, politician
- Tom Iremonger, politician
- Ted Kavanagh, radio scriptwriter
- Judith Mayhew, lawyer
- Donald McIntyre, operatic bass-baritone
- Rex Nan Kivell, art collector
- Nikola Rachelle, singer
- Ngāti Rānana, Māori culture group
- Angela Richardson, politician
- David Rickard, artist
- Macaulay's New Zealander, a mythical character from Punch fated to observe the ruins of the British Empire
- Dame Kiri Te Kanawa, opera singer

Politics and Law

Military

- Alan Deere, RAF Battle of Britain Pilot WW2
- Sir Keith Park, Royal Air Force Commander Battle of Britain WW2
- Sir John Westall, Commandant General Royal Marines, 1952-1955.
- Frank Worsley, Antarctic Explorer, Naval Officer

Sport

- Tony Benson, rugby league coach
- Warren Gatland, Rugby Coach Wales
- Dylan Hartley, rugby union player
- Graham Henry, Rugby Coach Wales, British Lions.
- Chris Wood, footballer
- Johnnie Hoskins, inventor of the motorcycle speedway
- London New Zealand Cricket Club, sports team
- Sean Maitland, rugby union player
- Bruce McLaren, F1 Race Car Driver & founder of McLaren F1 Team
- Cameron Norrie, tennis
- Ben Stokes, cricketer
- Willie Walker, rugby union player
- Gwenethe Walshe, dancer

Television and Film

- Gina Bellman, actress
- Geoffrey Cox, TV administrator & journalist
- Richard Curtis, screenwriter
- Barbara Ewing, actress
- Lucy Hockings, journalist, presenter
- Michael Miles, TV presenter
- Brian Perkins, radio personality & newsreader
- Bruce Purchase, actor
- Guy Remmers, actor (father)
- Dan Wootton, TV presenter

Writers

- Hector Bolitho, writer
- Dan Davin, author
- Robin Hyde, writer
- Sir David Low, political cartoonist
- Katherine Mansfield, writer
- Ngaio Marsh, writer
- Count Geoffrey Potocki de Montalk, poet
- Gerri Peev, journalist
- Hugh Walpole, novelist

== See also ==
- Australians in the United Kingdom
- British New Zealander
- Demographics of New Zealand
- Māori
- Fijians in the United Kingdom
