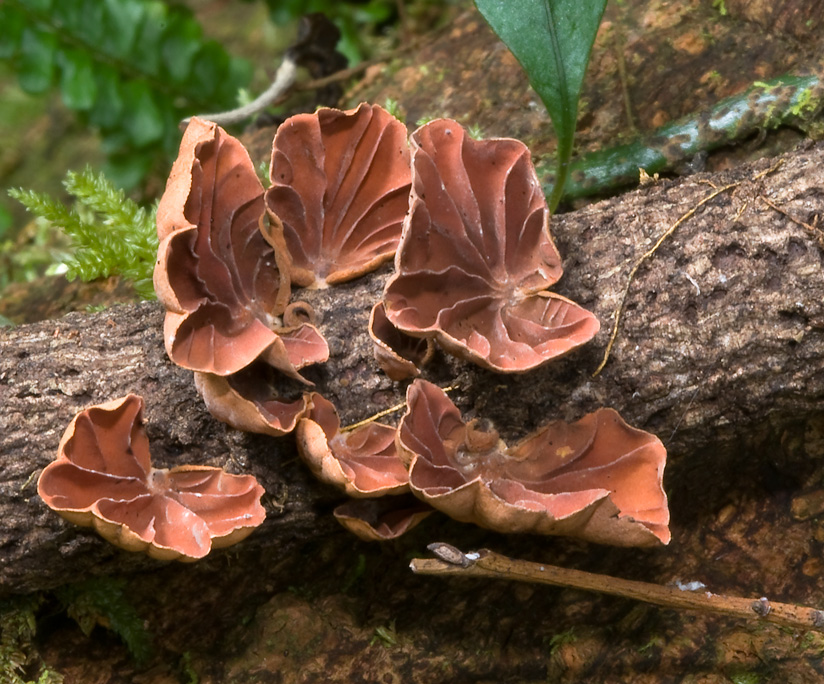
- Anthracophyllum archeri

Scientific classification
- Kingdom: Fungi
- Division: Basidiomycota
- Class: Agaricomycetes
- Order: Agaricales
- Family: Omphalotaceae
- Genus: Anthracophyllum; Ces.

Type species
- Anthracophyllum beccarianum Ces.

Species
- A. andinum A. archeri A. beccarianum A. discolor A. glaucophyllum A. lateritium A. melanophyllum A. nigritum A. pallidum A. paxilloides

= Anthracophyllum =

Genus of fungi

Anthracophyllum is a genus of fungi in the family Omphalotaceae in the order Agaricales. The genus is widespread in tropical regions, and contains 10 species.

== See also ==
- List of Marasmiaceae genera
