= Taumata =

Taumata is a New Zealand Māori word that means the brow of a hill.

It also occurs as a surname that may refer to:

- Arana Taumata (born 1989), a rugby league footballer
- Kevin Taumata, a Māori New Zealand Australian film and television actor
- Santo Taumata (born 2003), a New Zealand rugby union footballer who has played in the Black Ferns (women's national representative team)
- Piripi Taumata-a-Kura (fl. 1823–1868), a New Zealand Māori evangelist

== See also ==
- Taumata, referring to Taumatawhakatangihangakoauauotamateaturipukakapikimaungahoronukupokaiwhenuakitanatahu, a hill in Hawke's Bay, New Zealand. The full 85-character long name references Tamatea Urehaea.
- Tamatea (disambiguation)
