= Urban Māori =

Māori people living in urban areas

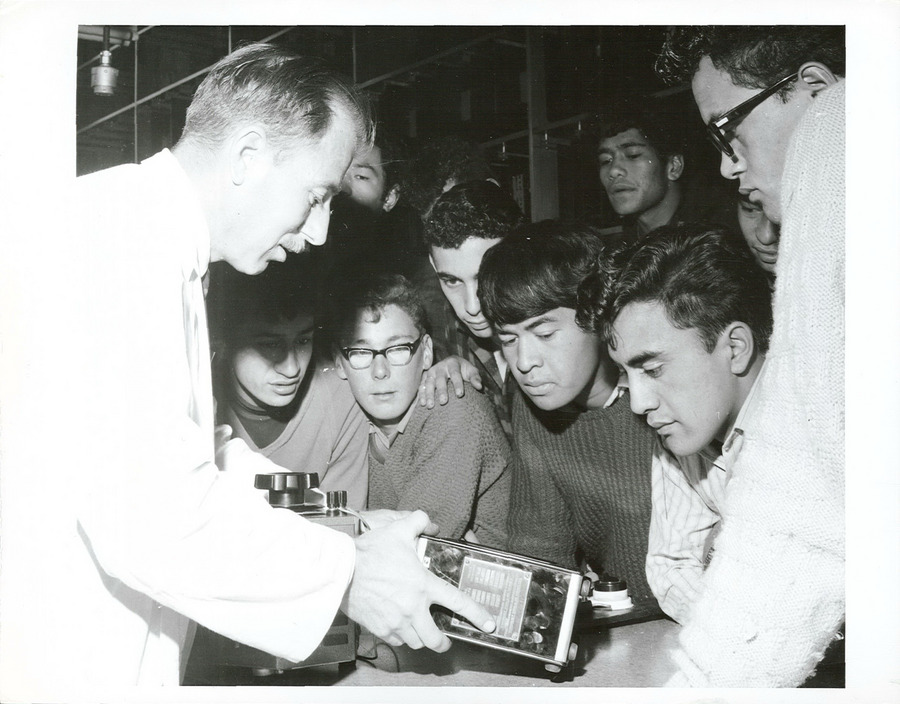
- Students attending an electrical pre-apprentice class at the Auckland Technical Institute in 1966

Regions with significant populations
- Auckland, Wellington, Christchurch, Hamilton, Tauranga, Dunedin, Palmerston North

Languages
- English, Māori

Urban Māori are Māori people living in urban areas outside the rohe (traditional tribal lands) of their iwi (tribe) or hapū (sub-tribe). The 2013 New Zealand census showed that 84% of Māori in New Zealand lived in urban areas, 25% lived in Auckland, and most others lived in other metropolitan centres like Wellington and Christchurch. Many Māori continued to associate with their iwi and their rohe, but more than 15% did not know their tribal affiliation.

Urban Māori associations include Ngāti Ākarana in Auckland, Ngāti Poneke in Wellington. There are also Māori associations in major cities in Australia, as well as Ngāti Rānana in London.

== History ==
During the 19th and early 20th centuries, the Māori population of New Zealand predominantly lived in rural communities away from large urban centres. This began to change during World War II, when the Manpower Act 1944 was used to encourage young Māori men and women who were ineligible to join the military to work in urban factories. Many soldiers who returned after the war also decided to settle in the urban centres of New Zealand, and people were enticed to cities at the prospect of finding work. Prior to World War II, approximately 10% of the Māori population lived in an urban setting. By 1951, this figure had increased to 19%, and five years later to 24%. The urban population grew even further to 62% of Māori by the mid-1960s, and nearly 80% by 1986.

During the 1960s, the Department of Māori Affairs officially encouraged the urbanisation of Māori, often finding work and accommodation for families interested in moving to the city. In the 1950s, Māori populations concentrated around wharves, factories and transportation infrastructure. In Auckland, this meant inner suburbs such as Freemans Bay, Ponsonby and Herne Bay, where housing was poor and decaying. To counter overcrowding in the central suburbs, large scale government-led housing projects were undertaken in the suburbs of Ōtara, Māngere and Te Atatū, while similar projects were undertaken in Wellington, at Porirua, the Hutt Valley and Wainuiomata.

Urbanisation caused a range of social structure changes for Māori, as many were now isolated from whānau and traditional lands. The pressures of capitalism and Western society made many Māori dedicate their time to jobs involving permanent employments, spending little time for subsistence gardening, which was more commonly undertaken in rural communities. Whānau (extended family) began to have less importance over the core nuclear family, and over time the significance of whānau changed in an urban context, with many families meeting at the homes of kaumātua and kuia for special occasions, such as times of celebration and bereavement. Many families struggled in the new urban environment with fewer extended family resources to assist them, which factored into issues such as homelessness and the development of gangs in New Zealand.

Voluntary associations, such as churches, Māori cultural clubs and the Māori Women's Welfare League took on a much more important role in the lives of urban Māori. Activities that had previously been undertaken at marae, such as birth and tangi were increasingly held at peoples' private residences, or at community halls, especially those associated with urban Māori associations such as Ngāti Ākarana in Auckland and Ngāti Poneke in Wellington. By the 1970s, associations with political groups such as Ngā Tamatoa had become important to the lives of many urban Māori, and in the 1980s urban Māori authorities such as Te Whānau o Waipareira Trust (West Auckland), the Manukau Urban Māori Authority (South Auckland), Te Rūnanga o Kirikiriroa Trust (Hamilton), Te Rūnanganui o te Ūpoko o Te Ika (Wellington), and Te Rūnanga o Ngā Maata Waka (Christchurch) were established to foster economic, social and community development in urban areas.

During the 1950s, urban Māori and Pākehā populations in cities tended to live discrete lives separate from one another, often only interacting for employment, religion and rugby. During the initial period of urbanisation, many Pākehā were mistrustful of urban Māori, believing that city life was inappropriate for Māori, and felt that social problems would arise due to the differing social and cultural norms of the cities. These attitudes decreased over time, and urban Māori and Pākehā begun to live less separate lives from each other.

By the 1960s, a new generation of children were being born: Māori who were raised in an urban context, and who could claim affiliations to a wide number of iwi, due to many marriages occurring between people immigrating from different areas of the country. Many people who grew up in urban environments felt a lack of connection to their iwi and traditional lands, and had little interaction with kaumātua and kuia to impart heritage and traditions. Many third and fourth-generation urban Māori do not know their tribal affiliations, or have little contact with their iwi. Many rurally located marae make active efforts to reconnect with urban Māori and those living outside of their traditional rohe, who are often referred to as taura here (bound ropes).

== Urban marae ==
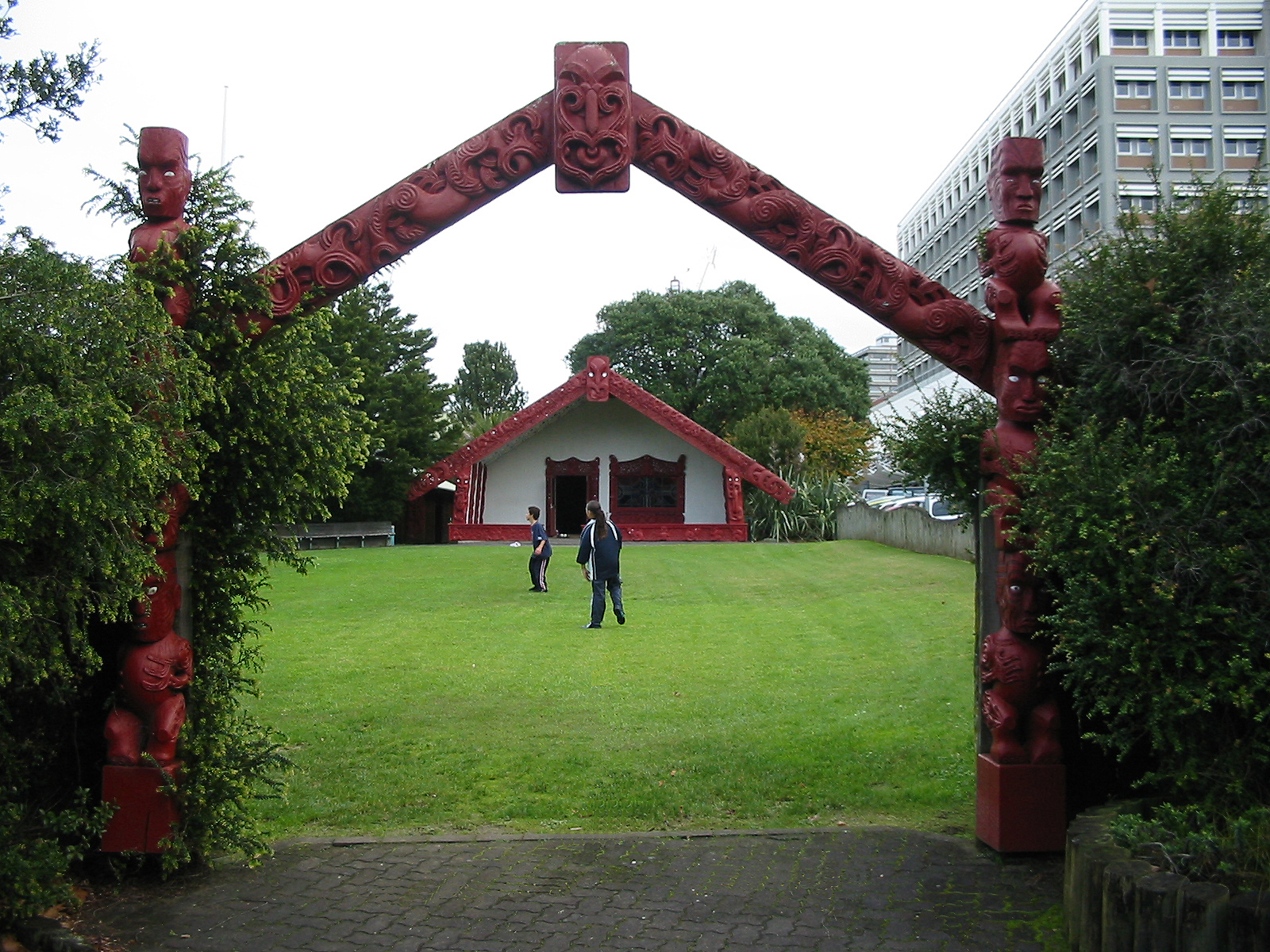
Waipapa Marae, an urban marae located at the University of Auckland

During the early 20th century, figures such as Te Puea Hērangi, Āpirana Ngata were proponents for re-establishing marae a symbol of Māori identity and mana, including urban marae serve populations who lived away from their traditional lands. A need for marae located in cities was felt due to community halls being inappropriate places to hold tangihanga.

In 1963, the Māori communities at Māngere and Onehunga were greatly affected by the Brynderwyn bus accident. The community struggled to host the tangihanga that they needed to hold for the members of their community, which became an impetus for the creation of the Te Puea Memorial Marae, the first urban marae in Auckland, which opened in 1965.

Over time, three types of marae were found in the cities of New Zealand. The first type were traditional marae which had become engulfed by the suburban development of cities, the second hapū-based marae to serve a specific extended family community, and the third being pan-tribal marae, which were built to serve the local Māori community regardless of whakapapa. The first of the latter was Āraiteuru Marae in Dunedin, which opened on 10 February 1980 with Minister of Māori Affairs Ben Couch as official guest. Other pan-tribal marae include Hoani Waititi Marae at Oratia in West Auckland, Ngā Hau e Whā Marae at Pukekohe, and Ngā Hau e Whā National Marae in Christchurch. Urban marae have also been established at educational facilities, such as secondary schools, universities and Polytechnics.

== See also ==
- Urban Indian
