= Ngā Hau e Whā National Marae =

Marae in Christchurch, New Zealand

Ngā Hau e Whā
- National Marae Christchurch
- Marae
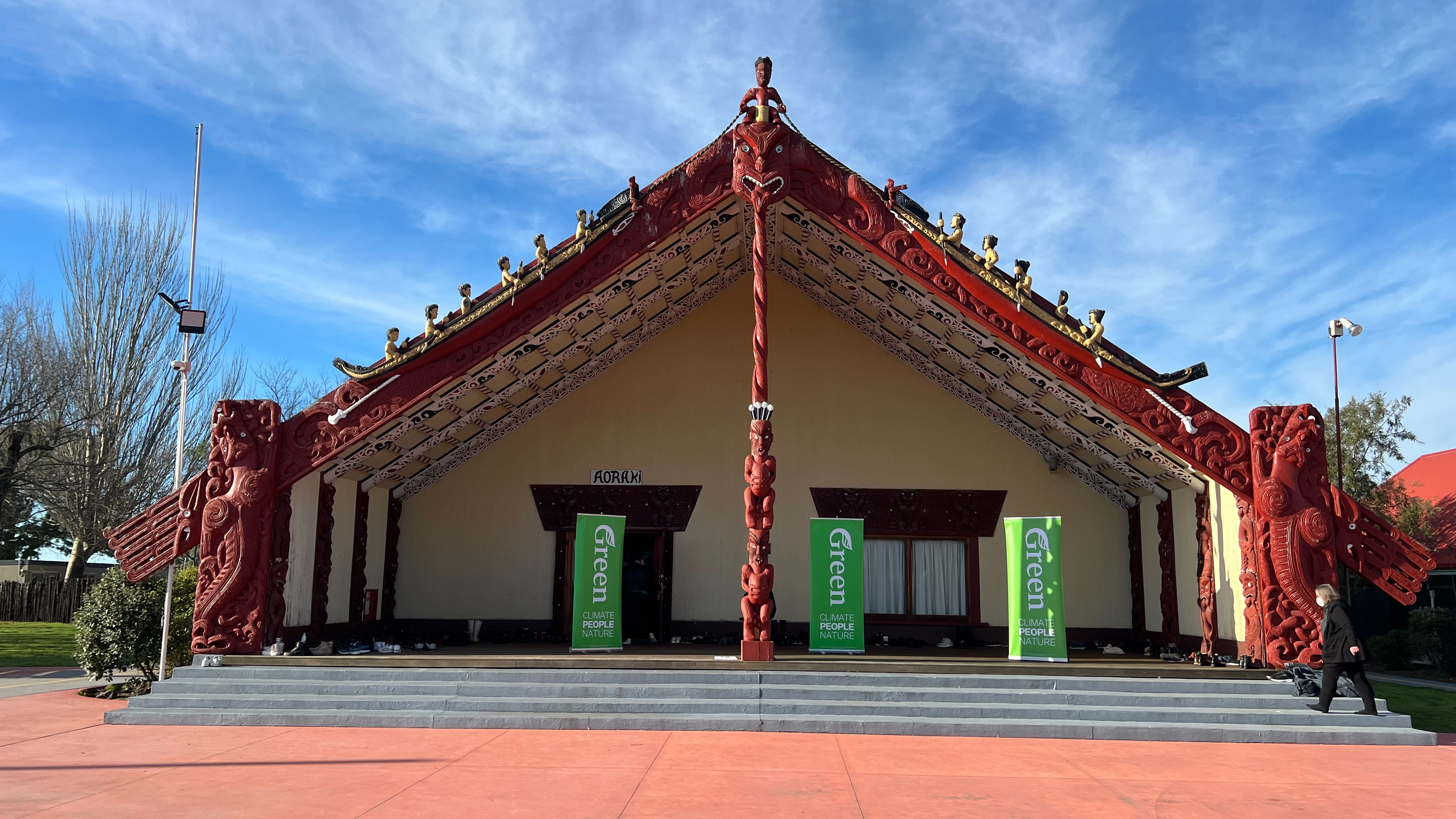
- The exterior of Aoraki, the wharenui
- Interactive map of Ngā Hau e Whā
- Etymology: 'the Four Winds'
- Coordinates: 43.52114°S 172.698635°E
- Location: Christchurch, New Zealand
- Rūnanga: Te Runanga o Nga Maata Waka
- Opened: May 1990
- Wharenui: Aoraki
- Whare wānanga: Te Aritaua Pitama
- Website: https://marae.maatawaka.org.nz/

Ngā Hau e Whā National Marae is a large marae in the Christchurch suburb of Bromley. The marae opened in May 1990 and is administered by Te Rūnanga o Ngā Maata Waka, a local pan-tribal urban Māori authority.

== History ==
The site was set aside by the Christchurch City Council for use as a marae in 1977. The location was part of Cuthbert's Green park. The planned marae triggered 180 complaints from nearby residents, but the project went ahead. The site is immediately adjacent to the Christchurch Wastewater Treatment Plant.

Construction of the marae began in 1981. During construction the project ran out of money, and ownership of the land was transferred to the New Zealand Government.

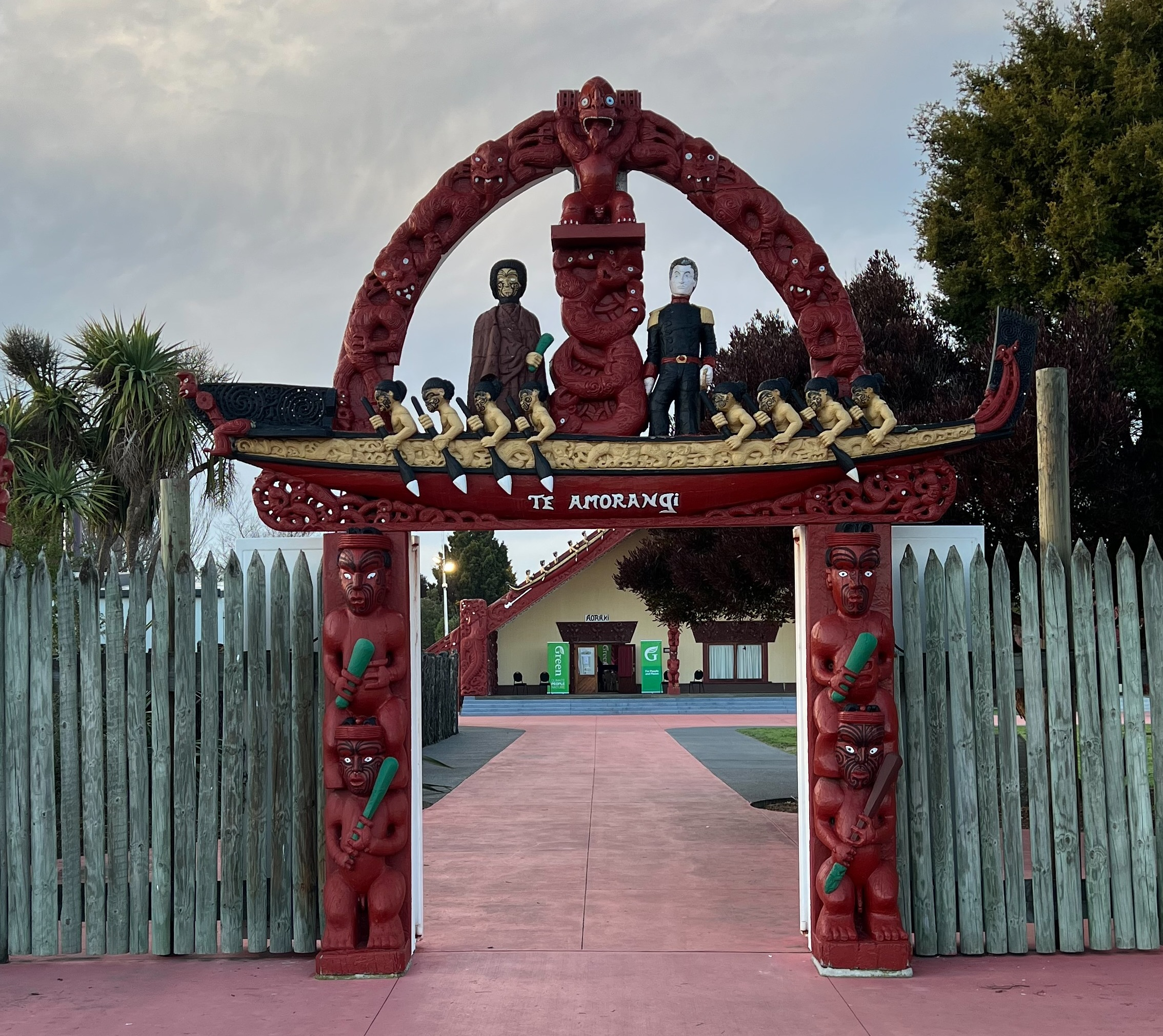
Te Amorangi is a carved entrance gate

One of the earliest installations at the marae was the carved entrance gateway, titled Te Amorangi, unveiled in late 1982. The carving depicts William Hobson and a Māori chief signing the Treaty of Waitangi, as a symbol of the coming-together of Pākehā and Māori. The lone chief is symbolic of the various Ngāi Tahu rangatira (chief) that signed the treaty on behalf of their iwi.

The main wharenui of the marae is named Aoraki, in reference to the Māori creation myth of the South Island. It is the largest wharenui of its kind in New Zealand. The construction utilised local unemployed people as labourers, to give opportunities to the community. One of the wall carvings depicts explorer James Cook, to represent that Pākehā are also welcome.

The marae was officially opened in 1990 in a ceremony by Minister of Māori Affairs Koro Wētere.

In the aftermath of the 2010 Christchurch earthquake, the marae hosted 26 government agencies to make them accessible to the community. This included hosting a day-to-day criminal court, an initiative that was praised by the New Zealand Law Society.

In 2018, a social housing facility opened on the grounds of the marae.

The marae hosted a walk-in vaccination clinic during the COVID-19 pandemic. In 2021 a medical centre opened at the marae, providing low-cost access to general practitioners.

== Marae operations and services ==
The marae provides services including education, health, counselling, tangihanga, driver education, advocacy, early childhood education, recreation, sport, justice, rangatahi (youth) courts, legal support, Māori legal services and employment initiatives. The marae manages a garden at nearby Tuahiwi producing vegetables for organisations and people in need.

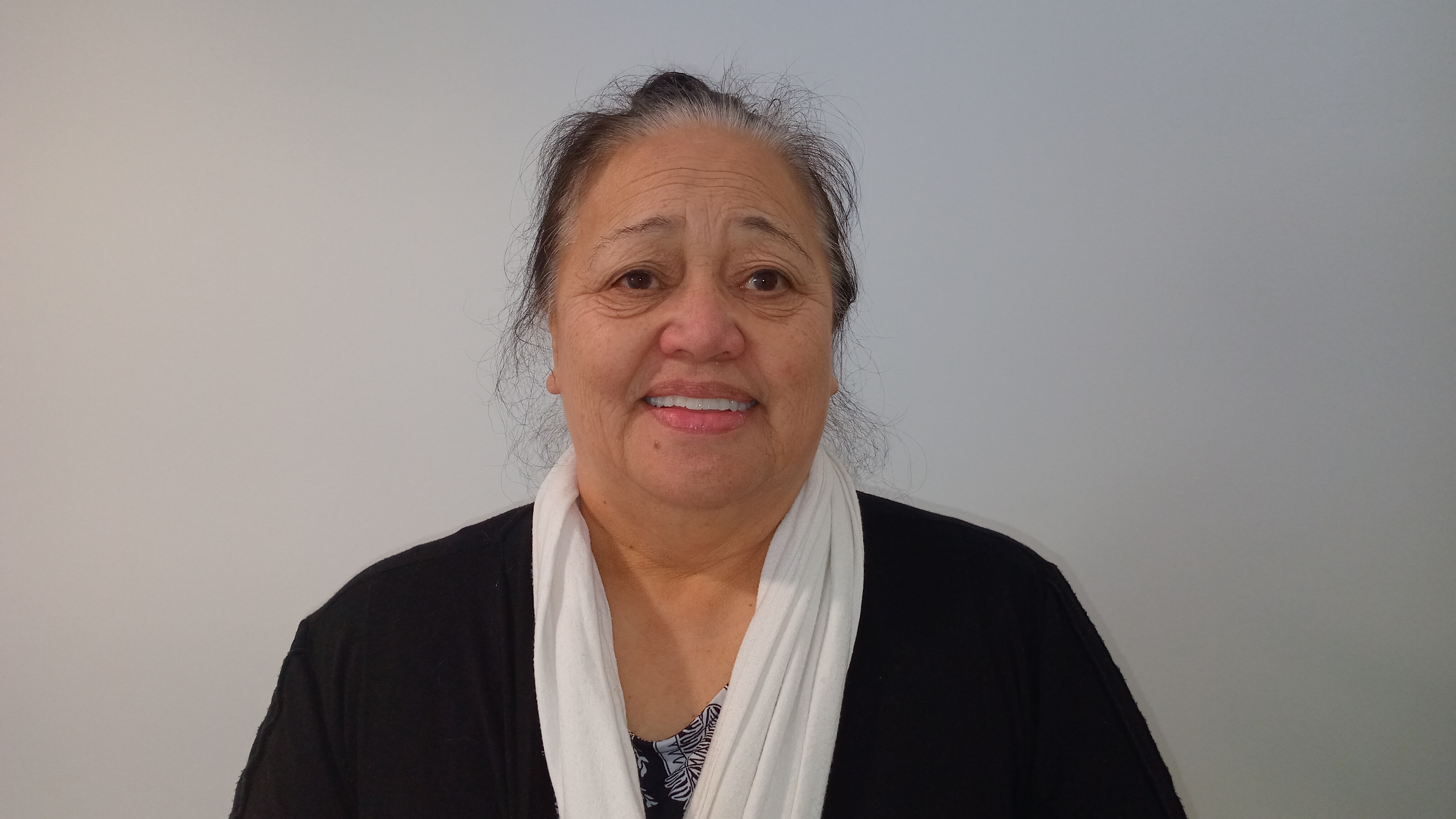
Linda Ngata

Linda Ngata (Ngāti Porou) is executive manager.

In 2023, the marae and Ngā Maata Waka had been run "for the past 20-plus years" by Norm Dewes (Ngāti Kahungunu) and Ngata. Dewes died on 31 December 2023.
