= Johann Friedrich Wilhelm Baucke =

New Zealand linguist, ethnologist, journalist and interpreter

Johann Friedrich Wilhelm Baucke (7 July 1848–6 June 1931) was a New Zealand linguist, ethnologist, journalist and interpreter. He was born in Chatham Islands, New Zealand on 7 July 1848, the son of German Lutheran missionaries, and is described in the Dictionary of New Zealand Biography as "reputed to be the last living man to have direct knowledge of the Moriori language".
