= Rūnanga =

Māori tribal assembly or council

In tikanga Māori (Māori culture or practice), a rūnanga (runaka in Southern Māori dialect) is a tribal council, assembly, board or boardroom. The term can also be a verb meaning "to discuss in an assembly". An iwi (tribe) can have one governing rūnanga and many sub rūnanga. In such cases it can be used to mean the subdivision of a tribe governed by that council. It is also used for non tribal affiliations as with the CTU Runanga a sub union for Māori workers.

The leader or representative of a rūnanga is sometimes referred to as Te Upoku o Te Rūnanga (literally "The head of the rūnanga").

== Historical organisation and practice ==
The Rūnanga System (1861–1863) constituted a system of Māori self-government devised by Governor George Grey, to be comparable to the provinces. The plan was for them to be led by European commissioners. The system was never fully implemented and was cancelled due to the New Zealand Wars.

== Modern practice ==
Rūnanga as a broad definition can be seen as the way groups make or attempt to make decisions. Māori groups and councils debate and discuss issues in a vast array of different ways which, while informed by the past, have changed greatly over the last century.

Examples of notable rūnanga
| Name | Group |
|---|---|
| Te Rūnanga o Ngāi Tahu | Iwi |
| CTU Runanga | Union |
| Ōtākou Runaka | Sub-iwi |
