= Fairton, New Zealand =

Fairton
- Locality
- Interactive map of Fairton
- Coordinates: 43°52′S 171°48′E
- Country: New Zealand
- Region: Canterbury
- Territorial authority: Ashburton District
- Ward: Ashburton
- Electorates: Rangitata; Te Tai Tonga (Māori)

Government
  - Territorial authority: Ashburton District Council
  - Regional council: Environment Canterbury
  - Mayor of Ashburton: Liz McMillan
  - Rangitata MP: James Meager
  - Te Tai Tonga MP: Tākuta Ferris

Area
  - Total: 13.62 km^{2} (5.26 sq mi)

Population (2023 census)
  - Total: 249
  - Density: 18.3/km^{2} (47.4/sq mi)

Fairton is a town in the Ashburton District, New Zealand.

The Newlands School house, opened near Rangiora in 1880, was moved to Fairton in 1901. The school moved to a new location donated by a local business in 1968.

== Marae ==
Hakatere Marae has occupied the original Fairton School building on State Highway 1 since 1970, two years after the school left the site. It held Waitangi Day events from 1973, and incorporated a hāngī into the annual holiday from 1974. The land was officially purchased by the Mid Canterbury Māori Committee in 1975.

The marae is named after the nearby Ashburton River.

The original school house and wharenui (meeting house) was destroyed by fire in 2003.

A new $300,000 wharekai (dining hall) was completed in 2007, the entranceway was widened in 2008, and a new multi-use conference building was completed in 2009.

The Ministry of Health granted the marae $10,000 a year from 2009 to 2012 to develop a community marae garden on a half acre of land.

Ashburton carver Vince Leonard completed carvings for the meeting house and Ashburton College until his death in 2019.

In October 2020, the Government committed $110,208 from the Provincial Growth Fund to renovate the marae, creating 14 jobs.

== Demographics ==
Fairton covers 13.62 km^{2} (5.26 sq mi). It is part of the Ashburton North statistical area.

Historical population
Year	Pop.	±% p.a.
2006	195	—
2013	228	+2.26%
2018	237	+0.78%
2023	249	+0.99%

Fairton had a population of 249 in the 2023 New Zealand census, an increase of 12 people (5.1%) since the 2018 census, and an increase of 21 people (9.2%) since the 2013 census. There were 132 males, 114 females, and 3 people of other genders in 90 dwellings. 2.4% of people identified as LGBTIQ+. There were 39 people (15.7%) aged under 15 years, 48 (19.3%) aged 15 to 29, 117 (47.0%) aged 30 to 64, and 45 (18.1%) aged 65 or older.

People could identify as more than one ethnicity. The results were 89.2% European (Pākehā); 19.3% Māori; 1.2% Asian; and 1.2% Middle Eastern, Latin American and African New Zealanders (MELAA). English was spoken by 98.8%, Māori by 3.6%, and other languages by 4.8%. No language could be spoken by 2.4% (e.g. too young to talk). New Zealand Sign Language was known by 1.2%. The percentage of people born overseas was 10.8, compared with 28.8% nationally.

Religious affiliations were 32.5% Christian, 1.2% Māori religious beliefs, and 1.2% other religions. People who answered that they had no religion were 53.0%, and 13.3% of people did not answer the census question.

Of those at least 15 years old, 15 (7.1%) people had a bachelor's or higher degree, 135 (64.3%) had a post-high school certificate or diploma, and 63 (30.0%) people exclusively held high school qualifications. 12 people (5.7%) earned over $100,000 compared to 12.1% nationally. The employment status of those at least 15 was 96 (45.7%) full-time, 39 (18.6%) part-time, and 6 (2.9%) unemployed.
