= Ngāti Rānana =

Māori cultural group based in London

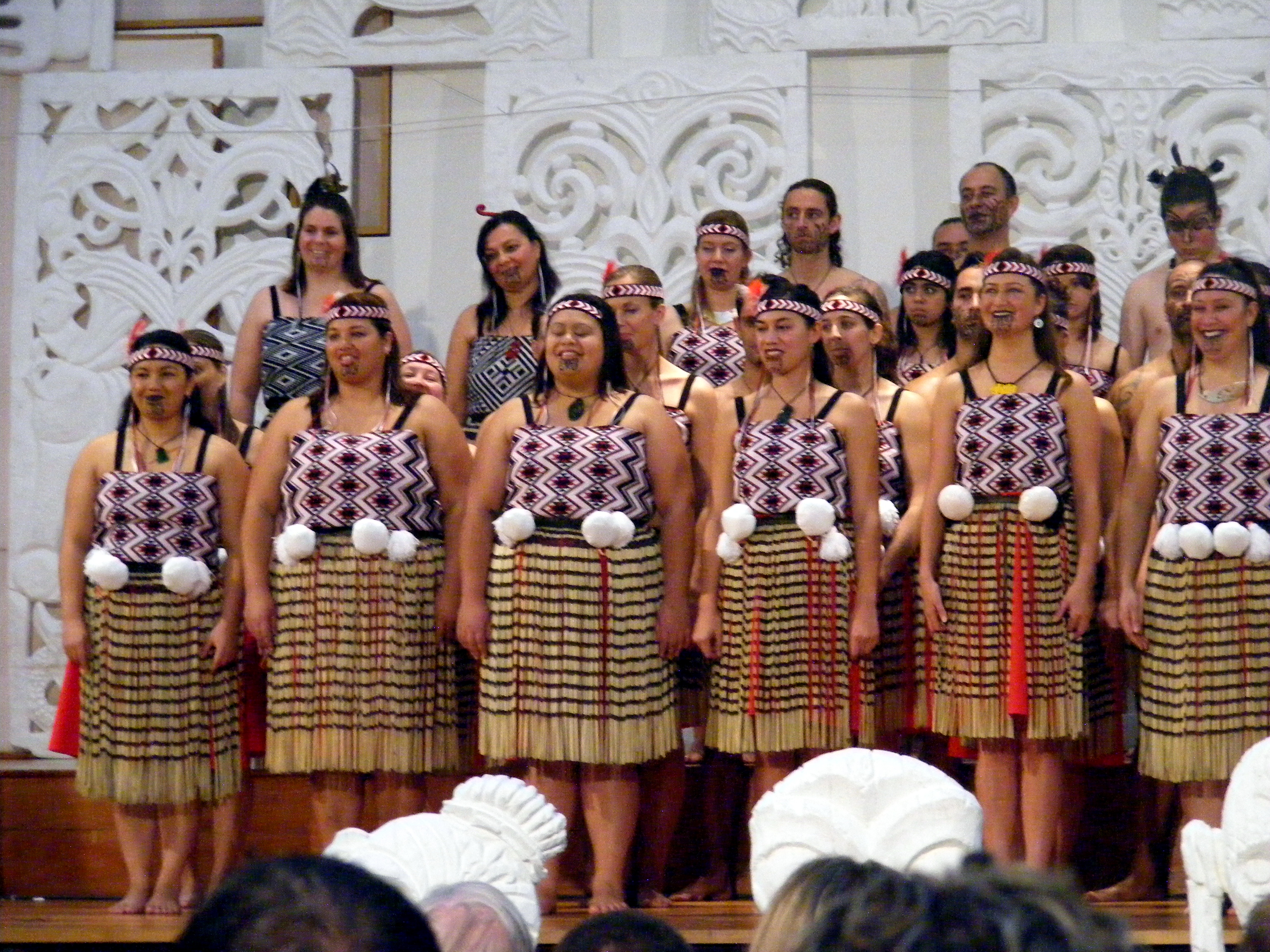
A concert hosted by Ngāti Rānana in 2009

Ngāti Rānana is a Māori cultural group based in London, United Kingdom. It is open to the Māori community in the city, and hosts events attended by many non-Māori. The club aims to provide "an environment to teach, learn and participate in Māori culture and to promote New Zealand through Māori culture". Its performing arts group regularly performs throughout the UK and the rest of Europe.

== History ==
In 1959 the group was founded by a small group of London-based New Zealanders as the London Māori Club. In 1971 it was renamed the Ngāti Rānana London Māori Club. Ngāti denotes a tribe (or iwi) and Rānana is a Māori-language transliteration of the name London.

Founding member Esther Jessop was awarded the Queen's Service Medal for community service in the 1994 New Year Honours. She was named New Zealander of the Year in Britain in 2009, and in the 2021 Queen's Birthday Honours she was appointed an Officer of the New Zealand Order of Merit, for services to Māori and to New Zealand–British relations.

Since 2005 the New Zealand Studies Association has issued the "Rahera Windsor Award for New Zealand Studies", in honour of another of Ngāti Rānana's founding members, Rahera Windsor.

== See also ==
- Māori in the United Kingdom
