= Te Atiawa o Te Waka-a-Māui =

Māori iwi (tribe) in Aotearoa (New Zealand)

- Iwi (tribe) in Māoridom
- Rohe (region): Upper South Island

Te Atiawa o Te Waka-a-Māui is a Māori iwi (tribe) in the upper South Island of New Zealand. Its rohe (tribal area) extends from Golden Bay and Marlborough Sounds at the top of the South Island to Cape Campbell, St Arnaud and Westport.

== Marae and wharenui ==
There are four marae and wharenui associated with Te Atiawa o Te Waka-a-Māui:

- Onetahua Kōkiri Marae (Te Ao Marama wharenui), Tākaka
- Te Āwhina marae (Turangāpeke wharenui), Motueka
- Waikawa marae (Arapaoa wharenui), Picton
- Whakatū marae (Kākāti), Nelson

== Governance ==
Te Atiawa o Te Waka-a-Māui Trust is recognised by the New Zealand Government as the governance entity of the iwi, following its Treaty of Waitangi settlement with the Crown under the Ngāti Kōata, Ngāti Rārua, Ngāti Tama ki Te Tau Ihu, and Te Ātiawa o Te Waka-a-Māui Claims Settlement Act 2014. The trust is a mandated iwi organisation in the Māori Fisheries Act, an iwi aquaculture organisation under the Māori Commercial Aquaculture Claims Settlement Act, a Tūhono organisation, and an "iwi authority" for the purposes of the Resource Management Act. Te Atiawa o Te Waka-a-Māui Trust is a charitable trust, governed by four trustees from Marlborough and four trustees from Nelson and Motueka. As of 2016, the chairperson of the trust is Glenice Paine, the general manager is Richardt Prosch, and the trust is based at Waikawa at Picton.

The iwi has interests in the territories of Tasman District Council, Nelson City Council and Marlborough District Council.

== Notable people ==
- Dave Mason, rugby league player

== See also ==
- List of Māori iwi
