= Tamatea =

Tamatea may refer to:

== People ==
- Tamatea Arikinui, legendary Māori explorer and captain of the Tākitimu canoe
- Tamatea Urehaea, legendary Māori explorer, grandson of Tamatea Arikinui

== Places and institutions ==
- Tamatea, Napier, New Zealand
- Tamatea / Dusky Sound, Fiordland, New Zealand
- Tamatea (meeting house), in Ōtākou, Dunedin, New Zealand
- Tamatea (whare), Motuti, Hokianga, New Zealand
- Tamatea ki te Huatahi meeting house, Mōtītī Island, New Zealand
- Tamatea Pokai Whenua meeting house of Pouākani Marae, Mangakino, New Zealand
- Tamatea Pokaiwhenua meeting house, Judea, New Zealand
- Tamatea, a geographical and administrative division of Ngāti Kahungunu, New Zealand
