= Te One =

Rural settlement on Chatham Island, New Zealand

- Location within Chatham Islands Location within Oceania
- Coordinates: 43.932831°S 176.527718°W
- Country: New Zealand
- Territorial authority: Chatham Islands

Population
  - Total: 58
- Time zone: Chatham Standard Time Zone

Te One is a settlement on the Chatham Islands. It is located in Petre Bay, on the west coast of the main island, 4 km north of the port settlement of Waitangi.

== Facilities ==
Whakamaharatanga, a marae (meeting ground) of Ngāti Mutunga, is located in Te One. It includes the Whakamaharatanga wharenui (meeting house). In October 2020, the New Zealand Government committed $198,318 from the Provincial Growth Fund to upgrade the marae, creating 6 jobs.

St Augustines Church, the Anglican church for the Chatham Islands, is at Te One. Services are held on the first Sunday of the month.

== Education ==
Te One School is a co-educational state primary school, with a roll of 59 as of July 2026. It is the main school on the Chatham Islands, but is one of the most isolated schools in New Zealand, which makes it harder for the school to attract teachers and access resources.
