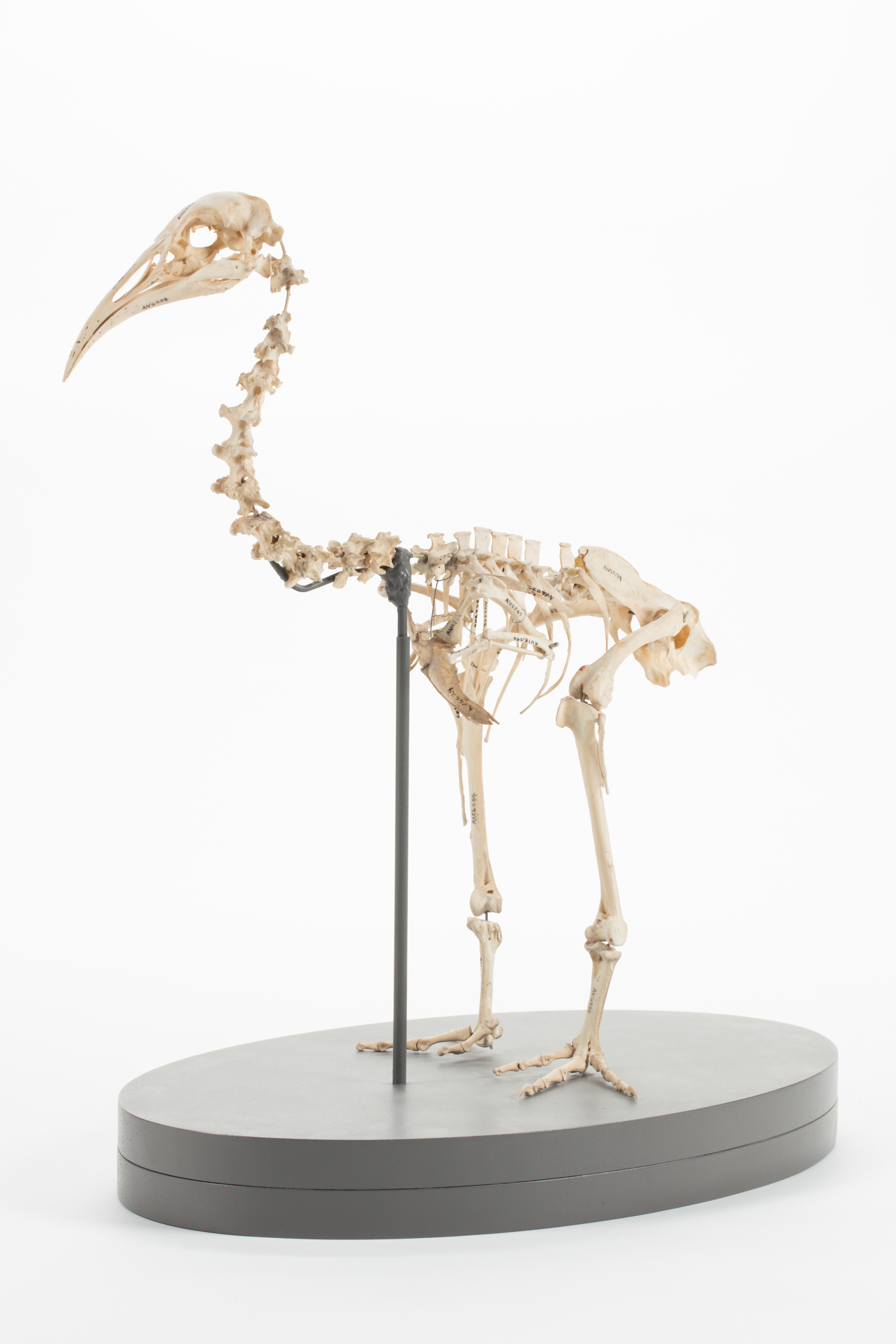
- Skeleton from the collection of Auckland Museum

Conservation status
- Extinct (1895) (IUCN 3.1)

- Extinct (1895) (NZ TCS)

Scientific classification
- Kingdom: Animalia
- Phylum: Chordata
- Class: Aves
- Order: Gruiformes
- Family: Rallidae
- Genus: †Diaphorapteryx; Forbes, 1892
- Species: †D. hawkinsi

Binomial name
- †Diaphorapteryx hawkinsi (Forbes, 1892)

= Hawkins's rail =

Hawkins's rail Temporal range: Holocene

Extinct species of bird

Hawkins's rail (Diaphorapteryx hawkinsi), also called the giant Chatham Island rail or in Moriori as mehonui, is an extinct species of flightless rail. It was endemic to the Chatham Islands east of New Zealand. It is known to have existed only on the main islands of Chatham Island and Pitt Island. Hawkins's rail was the largest terrestrial bird native to the Chatham Islands, around 40 centimetres (16 in) tall and weighing about 2 kilograms (4.4 lb). It had a long, downward curving beak. Historic accounts likely referring to the bird by the name "mehonui" suggest that it was red-brown in colour, and it has been compared to the weka in ecological habits, using its beak to probe decaying wood for invertebrates. Hawkins's rail likely became extinct due to overhunting by the islands native inhabitants, the Moriori, and the bird is known from skeletal remains found in their kitchen middens.

== Taxonomy ==
In 1892, Henry Ogg Forbes received several unusual fossil bones originating from the Chatham Islands sent by William Hawkins, amongst these was a distinctive skull, which Forbes realised represented a now extinct species of rail. He named the species Aphanapteryx hawkinsi in honour of Hawkins, placing the bird in the same genus as the extinct red rail from the Mascarene island of Mauritius in the Indian Ocean. Forbes proposed that a land bridge had once existed between Mauritius and the Chatham Islands, as part of his proposed lost continent of "Antipodea". Forbes personally went to the Chatham Islands later that year to do additional collecting. Later in 1892, on the advice of Edward Newton, Forbes placed Hawkins's rail into the separate genus Diaphorapteryx, though he later changed his mind and reverted to considering it to be a member of the genus Aphanapteryx. Between 1894 and 1895, Sigvard Jacob Dannefaerd collected several thousand bones of Hawkins's rail as part of a collection of "many hundreds of thousands" of bones collected from the Chatham Islands on behalf of the financier and zoologist Walter Rothschild. In 1896, the idea of a close relationship between the red rail and Hawkins's rail and the biogeographic connection between Mauritius and the Chatham Islands was criticised by Charles William Andrews due to there being no other overlapping species between the islands fauna, and Hans Friedrich Gadow considered the similar morphology of the two birds to be explained by parallel evolution.

=== Evolution ===
A 2014 genetic study found that the closest relative of Hawkins's rail was the invisible rail (Habroptila wallacii), endemic to the island of Halmahera in the Maluku Islands, Indonesia, with their last shared common ancestor existing around 10 million years ago. The two rails were then in turn found to be most closely related to the genus Gallirallus.

== Description ==
=== Skeleton ===
In life, the bird is estimated to have been approximately 40 centimetres (16 in) tall and weighed about 2 kilograms (4.4 lb). The wings of the bird are greatly reduced. The legs are robust with elongate toes. The beak is elongate and curves downwards (decurved).

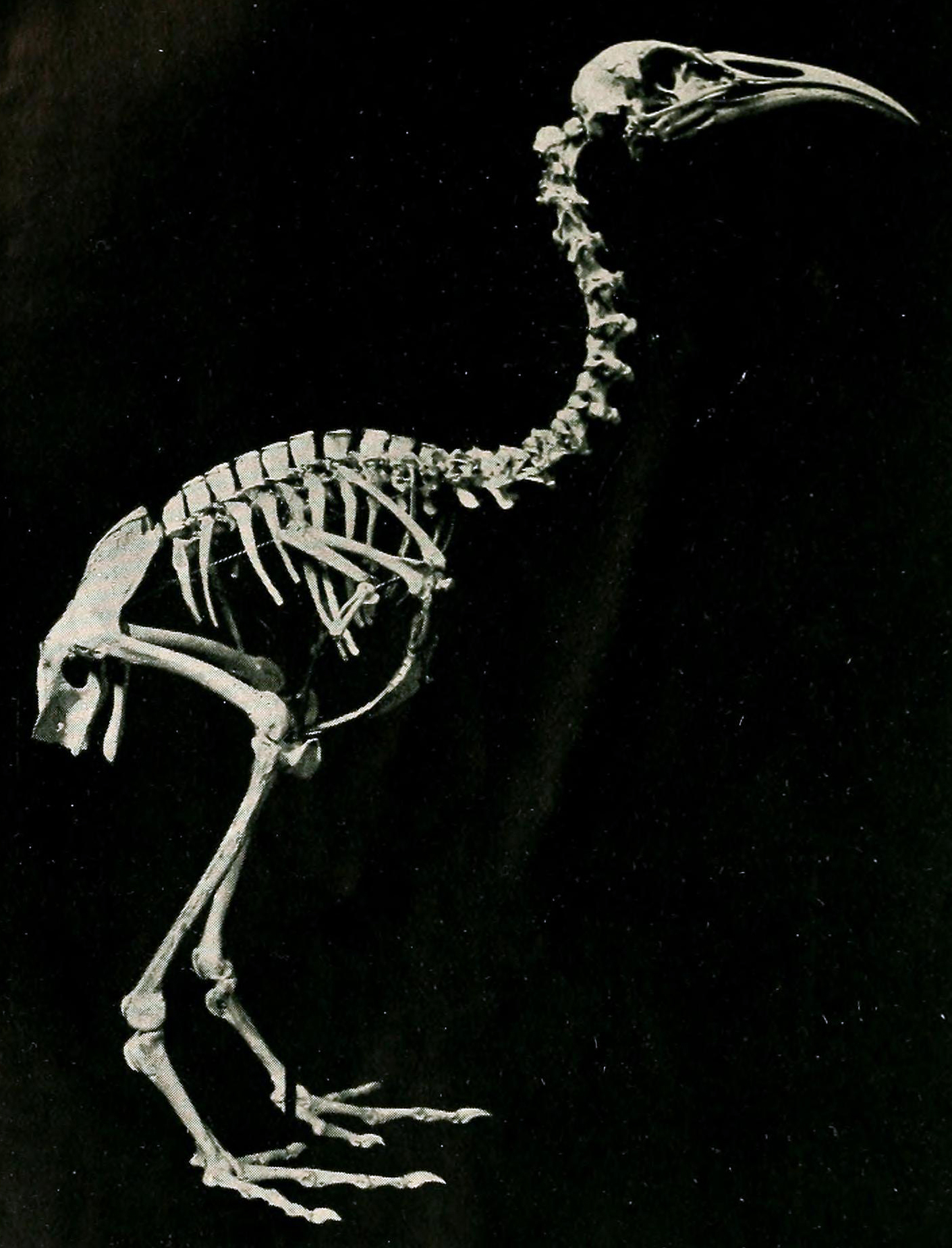
Skeleton of Hawkins' rail (Diaphorapteryx hawkinsi)

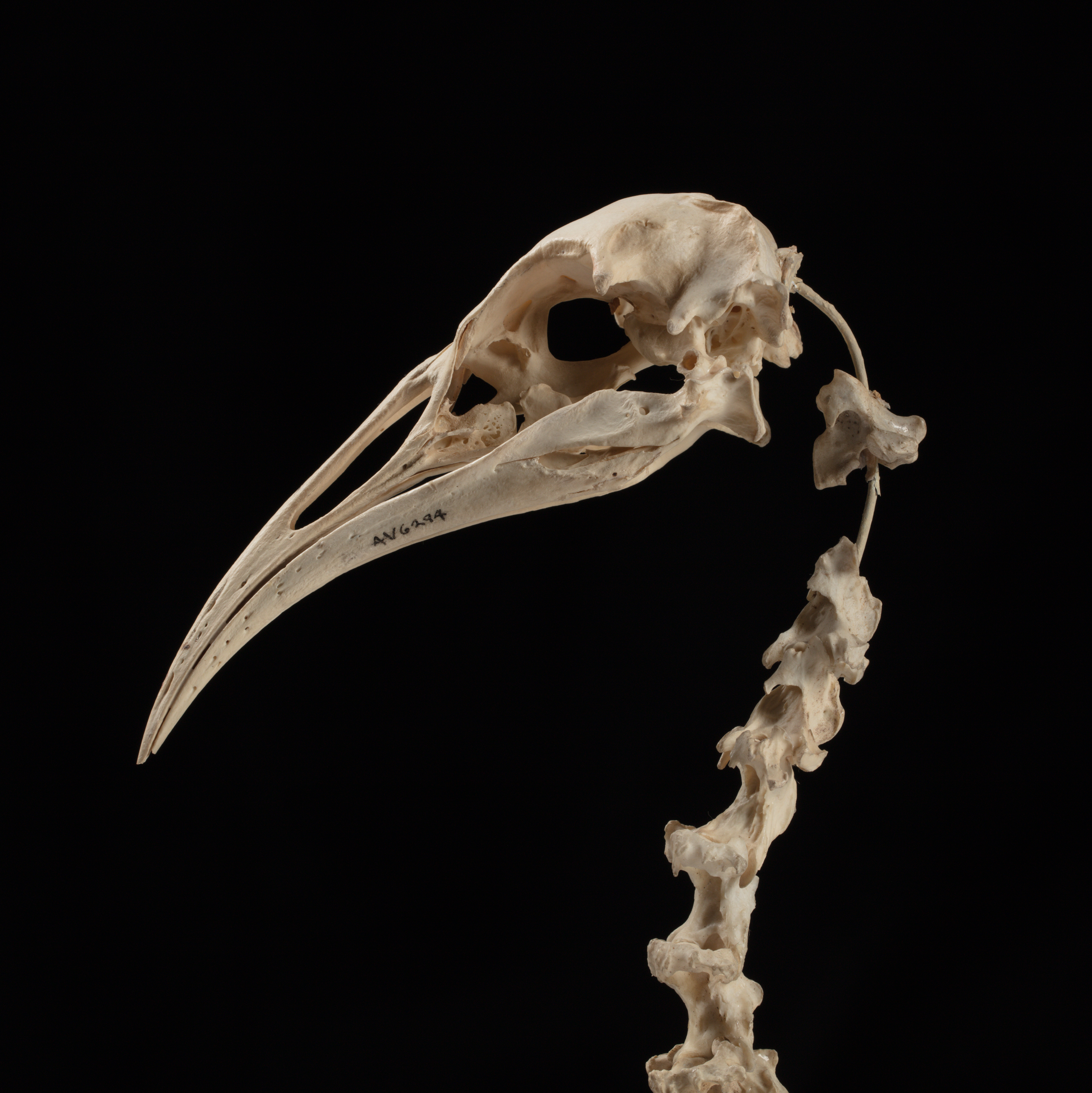
Skull closeup

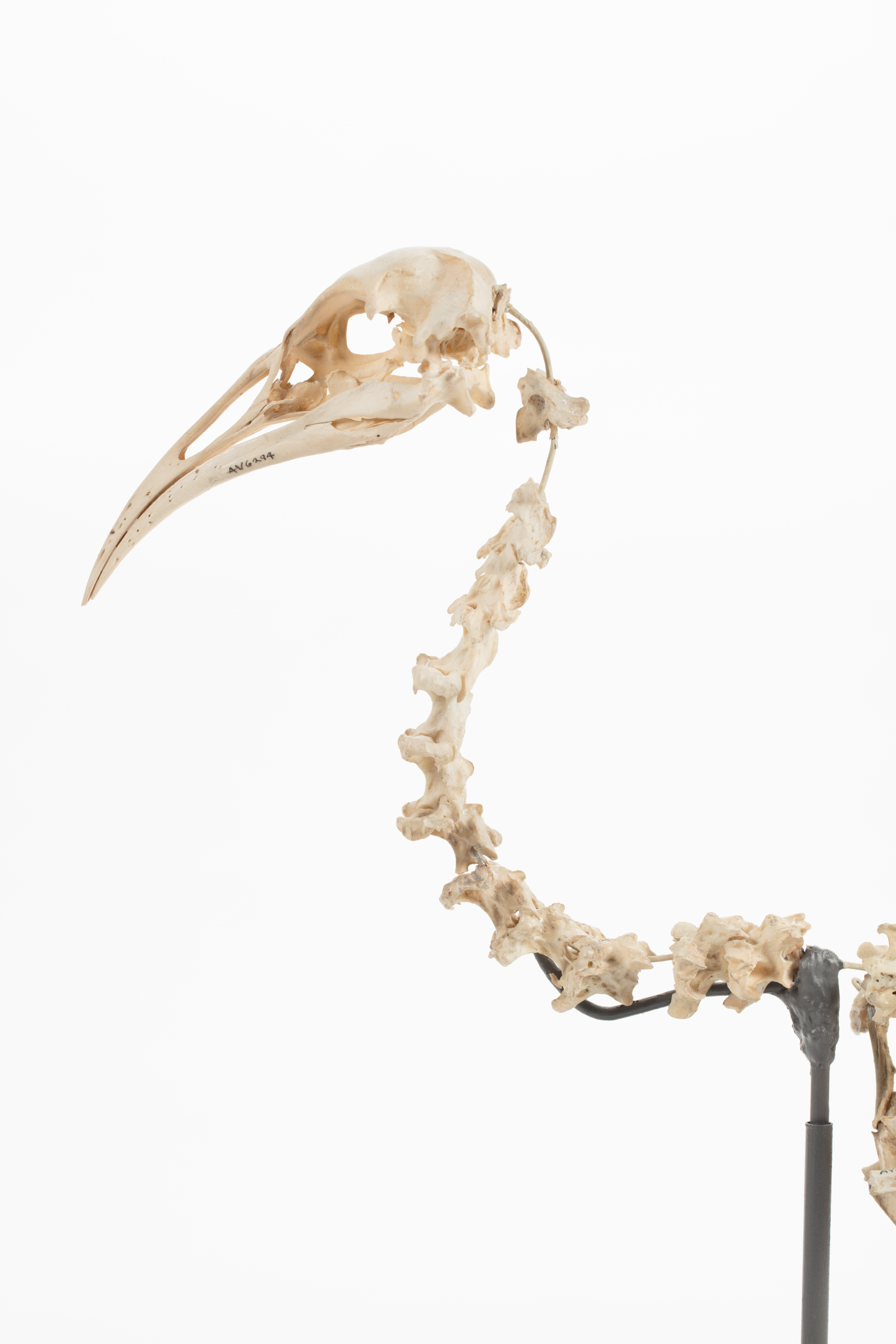
Fossil bones from the collection of Auckland Museum

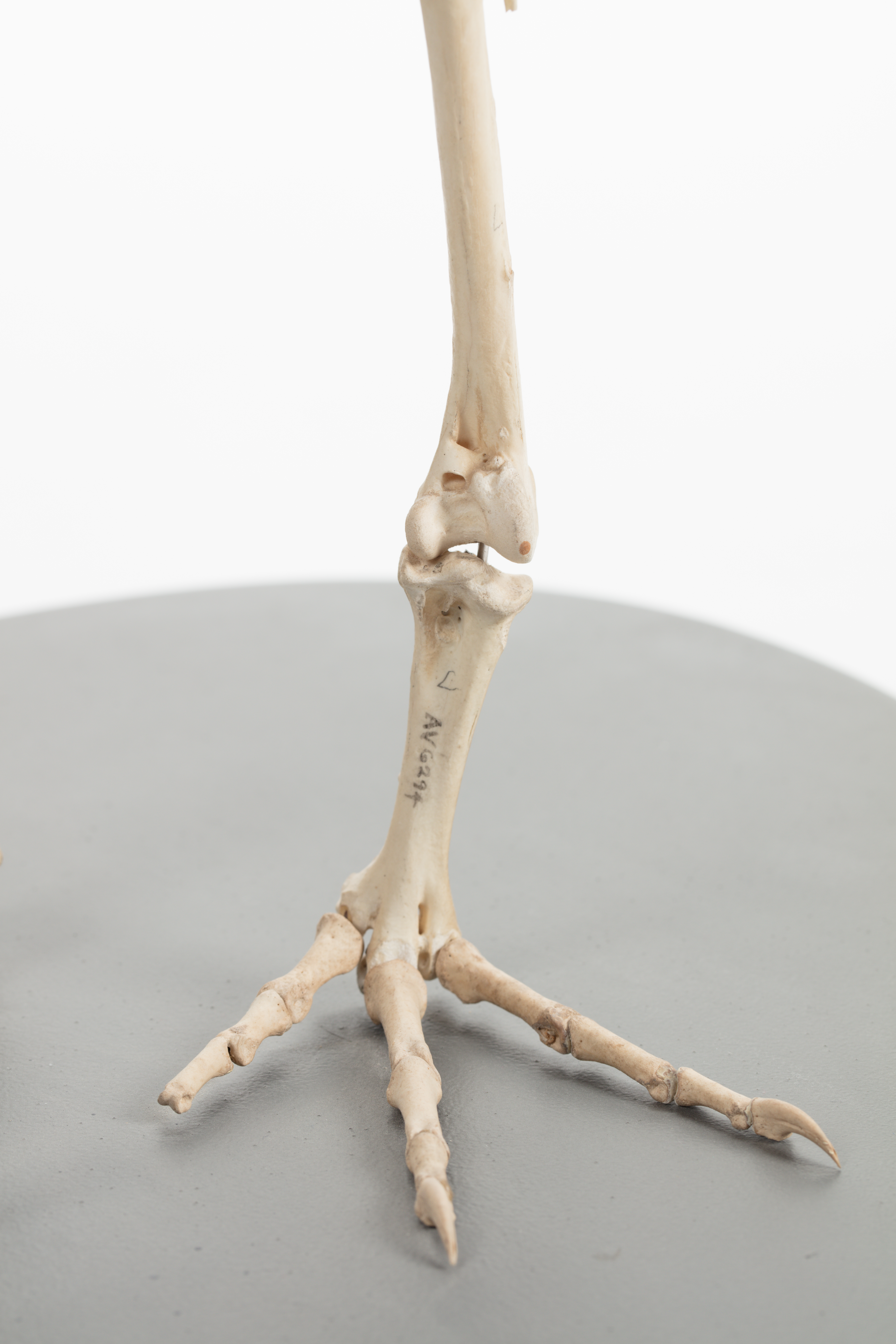
Leg and foot bones from the collection of Auckland Museum

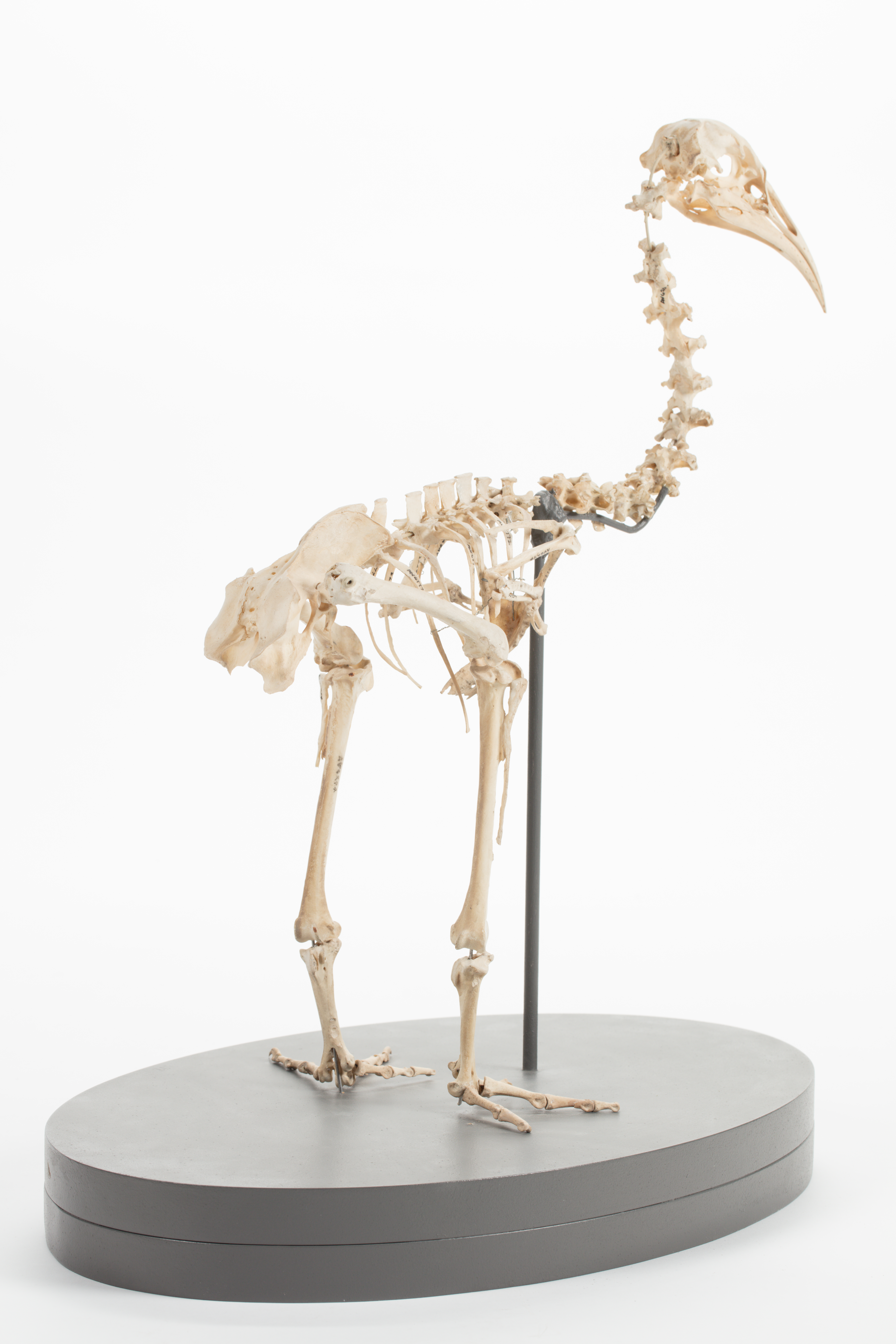
Skeleton from the collection of Auckland Museum

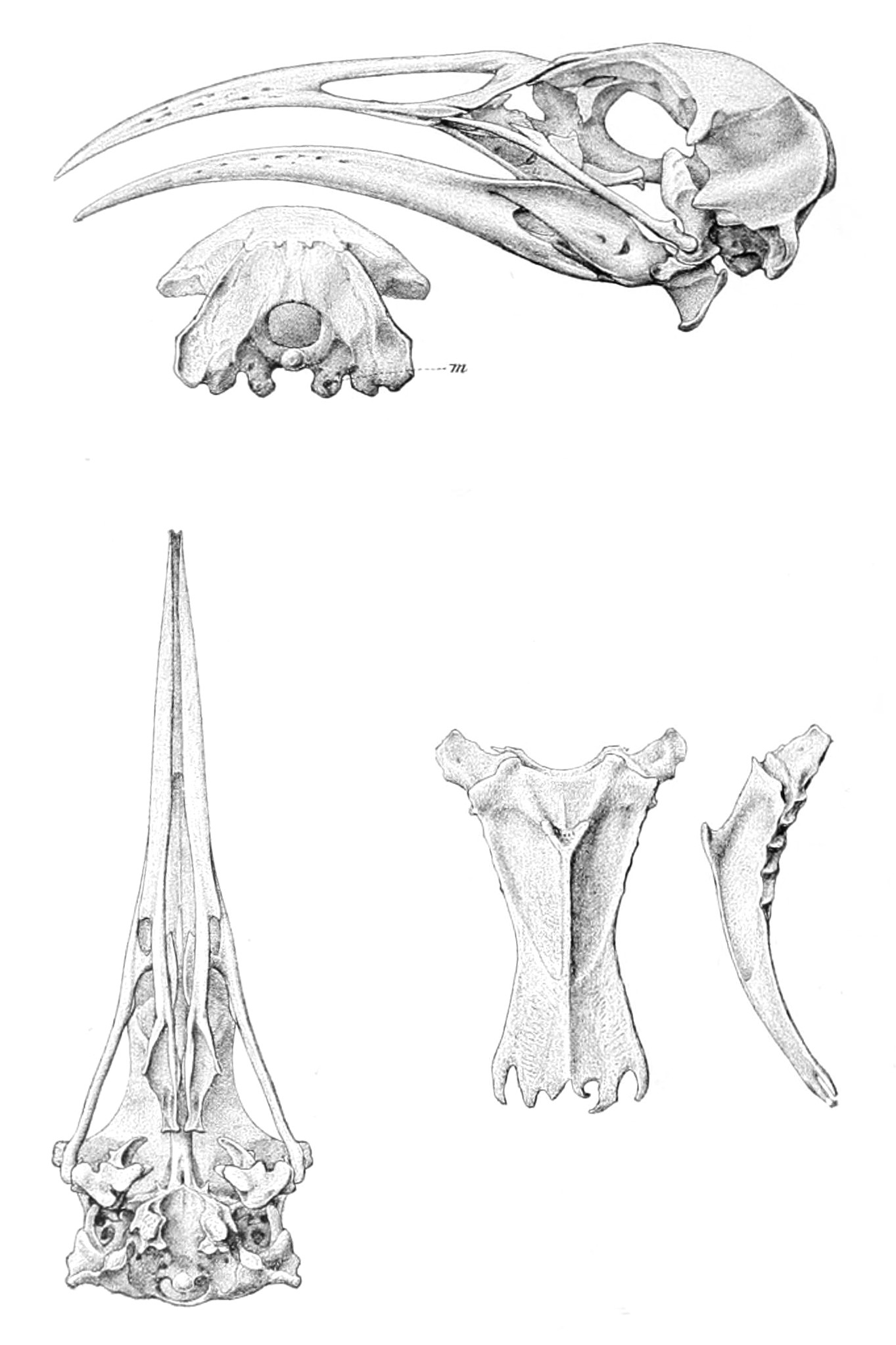
Skull bones

=== Historical accounts ===
No contemporary European accounts of the bird exist, and it was long thought that Hawkins's rail became extinct hundreds of years prior to European discovery of the Chatham Islands in the early 19th century, with Millener 1999 suggesting that the extinction of Hawkins's rail took place between approximately 1550 and 1700 AD. However, historic accounts based on recollections by Moriori of a bird referred to as the Mehonui suggest that Hawkins's rail may have become extinct much later. An 1895 letter from Sigvard Dannefaerd belonging to Walter Rothschild describes the appearance, behaviour, and Moriori hunting method concerning the species:

The Large Rail that Forbes Clased as Aphenapteryx the Moriori Name for same is "Mehonui" (nui mens Large) I hunted ap the oldest Moriori Chief on the Island and ther tradition of the Bird is, it ware Larger than a Goase and had a verry loud Cry like Tue-ck it always walked with the Head down pecking in decaed wood on the Ground, the would often catch them by walking stret ap to them from the front of them, but they could not cam over them from the side, and the yused to Sleep together in Colonies and the Morioris yused to find out ware a Colony had ther Sleeping plase, then sneek quietly ap and make a rush and Kill the hole Colony. The described them as of a Dull Brick Red Colour

A second account was published by Alexander Shand in 1911, in his writings on Moriori cuisine:

For variety they had Fernroot (Eruhe) and Karaka nuts (of which latter, in good seasons, they preserved very large quantities); together with birds of the forest, such as the wood pigeon (Pare or Parea), Koko (Maori, Tui), Komako (Maori, Makomako), Mehonui, a species of the New Zealand Kākāpō (Stringops habroptilis), larger than a goose, and the Mehoriki, a bird about the size of a small hen. Both the latter are extinct; they were wingless birds. There were also several varieties of duck (Perer'), which were snared in pools or ponds, or driven ashore in the moulting season (Perer' mounu). They were driven from the lagoons into the rushes and coarse growth of the "clears", or open land, where large numbers were caught. They also had the Pakura (Porphyrio melanotis). The Mehonui was usually captured on its sleeping place or nest, where several – six or eight – might be found huddled together, as the Morioris declare, like pigs in a bed. Having by observation, found its sleeping place on the "clears", the Morioris made long tracks leading up to it, carefully removing any sticks or obstructions which might alarm the bird by cracking, and then, by making a stealthy rush, they pounced on and secured all in the nest or sleeping place. This bird had a powerful strident call, which could be heard at great distances. Its neck was said to be about as long as a man's arm. The Mehonui was peculiar in this, that if any one approached it in front it did not see him, and, approached thus quietly, was caught by the neck and strangled. It kept its head continually on the ground looking for food, chiefly fernroot, which it burrowed for and dug out with its powerful bill, making, it is said, a rooting like a pig; any one, however, coming from the side or behind was quickly detected, and the bird made off. Its colour was a reddish brown, something like the New Zealand Kaka.

Shand's account mistakenly refers to Hawkins's rail as a type of parrot, but the remaining details are consistent with Dannefaerd's account. The source of the accounts was likely the Moriori elder Hirawanu Tapu (1824-1900), a noted source on Moriori tradition. The accounts suggest that the bird was dull brick-red in colour, that it spent much of its time pecking for invertebrates in decaying wood, similar behaviour is known from weka. The loud "Tue-ck" cry may have been the contact call. The "colonies" referred to in the accounts likely refer to family groups of five to eight individuals formed during the breeding season, as occurs in related rail species. Due to the strength of its beak it has been suggested to have been capable of consuming a wide variety of prey, including on ground dwelling chicks, such as those of petrels.

== Extinction ==
The presence of detailed accounts from the late 19th century suggest that the extinction of Hawkins's rail was more recent than previously supposed, and that the birds survived long after the arrival of the Moriori. It has long been known that the Moriori hunted the bird, due to their remains being found in midden deposits. Neither of the two accounts states the abundance of the birds or how often hunting of them occurred, but in their analysis of the accounts Joanne Cooper and Alan Tennyson suggest that the strategy of targeting what were likely the breeding groups of birds, containing both adults and juveniles, maximised impact on population. Cooper and Tennyson suggest that if the birds survived into the early European era, they may have finally become extinct due to the introduction of non-native mammals to the island, including cats, dogs, brown rats, and pigs, prior to the first survey of the islands fauna in 1840.
