= Nunuku-whenua =

Moriori chief

Nunuku-whenua was a sixteenth-century Moriori chief who is known for being a pacifist.

The Moriori, a Polynesian people, migrated to Rēkohu (Chatham Islands) from mainland New Zealand around the year 1500 AD. Their ancestors, the Wheteina and Rauru tribes of Hawaiki, intermarried with inhabitants already on the island known as the Hamata Tribe, who were descended from Rongomaiwhenua.

Following bloody conflict between these three groups, Nunuku-whenua, a prominent Moriori chief, established "Nunuku's Law", which forbade the eating of human flesh and murder. He proclaimed: "Never again let there be war as there has been this day. Do not kill." There was an accompanying curse: "May your bowels rot the day you disobey".

Moriori obeyed Nunuku's Law strictly, and maintained peace in the Chathams until 1835, when Ngāti Mutunga and the Ngāti Tama, two North Island iwi, arrived in the Rēkohu in search of resources and territories. They were initially welcomed by the Moriori before their intentions for conquest became clear. Moriori gathered urgently for a council at Te Awapātiki. Although youths argued in favour of armed resistance as they outnumbered the invaders, elders ruled that Nunuku's Law could not be broken as it was a covenant with their gods. The Moriori population were conquered, enslaved, and eaten by the invaders. Their population was almost completely exterminated as a result. By the time they were released from slavery in 1863, around 1561 Moriori had died.

A cave on Rēkohu is dedicated to Nunuku known as Te Ana a Nunuku. It is adorned with petroglyphs of seals and birds.
