= Moriori genocide =

Atrocity in 1835; part of the Musket Wars

- Part of Musket Wars
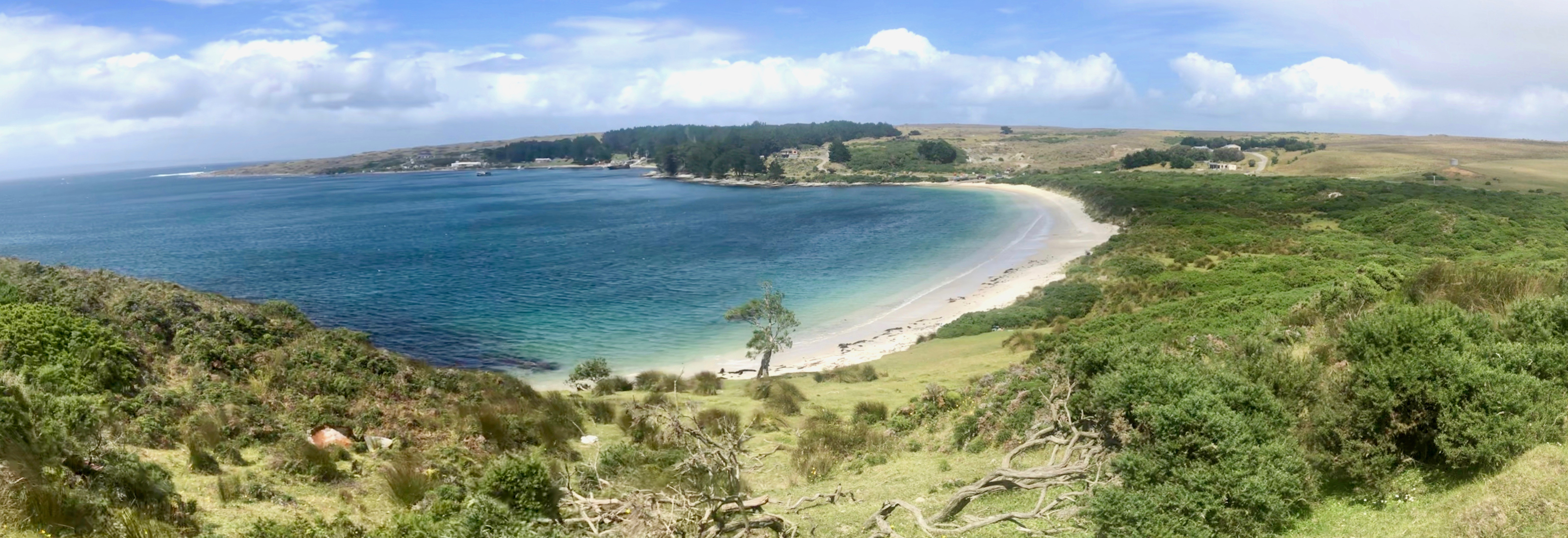
- Port Hutt, where the invaders landed in late 1835
- Location: Chatham Islands
- Date: 1835–1860s
- Target: Moriori
- Attack type: Genocide, invasion, enslavement
- Deaths: 1,561
- Perpetrators: Members of Ngāti Tama and Ngāti Mutunga

The Moriori genocide was the mass murder, enslavement, and cannibalisation of the Moriori people, the indigenous ethnic group of the Chatham Islands, by members of Ngāti Mutunga and Ngāti Tama, two Māori iwi from mainland New Zealand, from 1835 to 1863. The invaders murdered around 300 Moriori and enslaved the remaining population. This, together with diseases brought by Europeans, caused the population to drop from 1,700 in 1835 to 100 in 1870. The last individual of sole-Moriori ancestry, Tommy Solomon, died in 1933.

== Background ==
=== Moriori ===
The Moriori are the indigenous population of the Chatham Islands (Moriori: Rēkohu), specifically Chatham Island and Pitt Island. It is thought that Moriori have the same Polynesian ancestry as Māori people. According to oral tradition the Moriori came to the Chatham Islands from Eastern Polynesia around 1500 AD, a couple of hundred years after Māori first arrived on the mainland, and that later migration came from mainland New Zealand. Mainstream academic opinion holds that Moriori did arrive around 1500, but from New Zealand. By the time of invasion, Moriori had formed their own culture adapted to their isolated island environment and its marine resources. The Moriori population peaked at around 2,000 people, divided among nine tribes.

After bloody inter-tribal conflict on the islands, the high-ranking Moriori chief Nunuku-whenua introduced a philosophy of non-violence in the 16th century, known as Nunuku's Law. This law became engrained in Moriori culture.

In November 1791, the British survey brig, HMS Chatham, was blown off course to the islands, which were then claimed for Britain in a formal flag-raising ceremony by the ship's commander, Lieutenant William Broughton. In a misunderstanding with the ship's crew, a Moriori man, Tamakaroro, was shot dead. Moriori elders believed Tamakaroro was partly at fault for the shooting and planned appropriate visitor greeting rituals.

=== Māori invaders ===
The two invading Māori tribes, Ngāti Mutunga and Ngāti Tama, were originally from Taranaki. They had been driven out of their homeland during the Musket Wars against other iwi and had settled around Wellington Harbour.

== Invasion ==
Map of the Chatham Islands. Chatham Island is the largest, Pitt Island is the second largest, and South East Island is the small island to the right of Pitt.

In 1835, with the forced assistance of the crew, several hundred Māori, mostly of Ngāti Mutunga and Ngāti Tama at Port Nicholson, sailed to the Chatham Islands aboard the brig whaler Lord Rodney in two sailings. The hijacked ship carried 500 people on the first sailing, which arrived on 19 November 1835. The second sailing arrived on 5 December 1835. With the arrival of the second group "parties of warriors armed with muskets, clubs and tomahawks, led by their chiefs, walked through Moriori tribal territories" and "curtly informed the inhabitants that their land had been taken and the Moriori living there were now vassals." When some Moriori argued back, they were killed.

Due to the new arrivals' hostility, a council of 1,000 Moriori was convened at Te Awapātiki, on the eastern side of the island, to debate possible responses. Younger members argued that the Moriori should fight back as they outnumbered Māori two-to-one. Elders, however, argued Nunuku's Law should not be broken. Despite knowing Māori were not pacifist, Moriori ultimately decided to stay pacifist against the invaders, describing Nunuku's Law as "a moral imperative".

Although the council decided in favour of peace, the invading Māori inferred that the meeting was a prelude to war. They launched a pre-emptive attack on Moriori in their homes as soon as they had returned from the council. Around 300 Moriori were killed, with hundreds more enslaved. The Māori ritually killed around 10% of the population. Stakes were driven into some of the women, who were left to die in pain.

During the period of enslavement the Māori invaders forbade the speaking of the Moriori language. They forced Moriori to desecrate sacred sites by urinating and defecating on them. Moriori were forbidden to marry Moriori or Māori or to have children. This was different from the customary form of slavery practised on mainland New Zealand.

At the time of the invasion in 1835 there were around 1,650 Moriori on the islands, with a total of 1,561 Moriori dying between the invasion and the release of Moriori from slavery by the British in 1863, and in 1862 only 101 Moriori remained. In addition to the many who were killed by homicide, many others died of diseases brought by Europeans.

== Government dealings ==
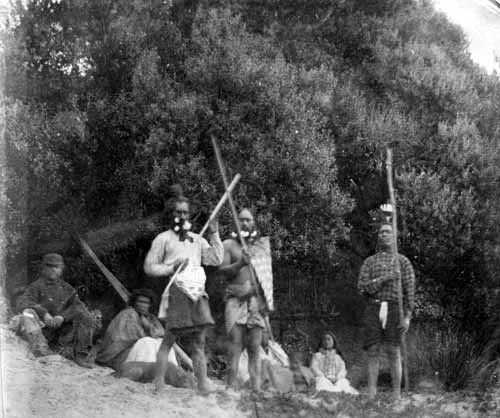
Moriori people in the late 19th century

Moriori petitioned the New Zealand Government from the 1850s for recognition of their status as the indigenous population of the islands and for restoration of their lands. The release of Moriori from slavery in 1863 occurred via a proclamation by the resident magistrate of the Chatham Islands.

In 1870, a Native Land Court was established to adjudicate competing land claims; by this time most Māori had returned to Taranaki. The court ruled in favour of the Māori, awarding them 97% of the land. The judge ruled that since the Moriori had been conquered by Māori they did not have ownership rights of the land.

== In modern times ==
The last individual of sole-Moriori ancestry, Tommy Solomon, died in 1933, though there remain just under a thousand people who identify as Moriori.

Moriori culture underwent a revival beginning with a 1980 documentary, which corrected lingering myths about Moriori. These myths include the claim that Moriori were extinct and that Moriori inhabited mainland New Zealand before Māori.

Waitangi Tribunal hearings began in 1994 for recognition of the continued identity of Moriori as the original inhabitants of the Chatham Islands and compensation. The tribunal's report, released in 2001, agreed with Moriori claims. In 2020 a treaty settlement, including an agreed account of history, a transfer of lands significant to Moriori, and $18 million in compensation, passed in Parliament.

The first Moriori marae on Chatham Island, Kōpinga Marae, was opened in 2005. A central pou (post) in the building displays the names of over 1,500 ancestors alive in 1835, compiled by Moriori elders in 1862 and sent to Governor George Grey.
