= Tommy Solomon =

Last full-blooded Moriori

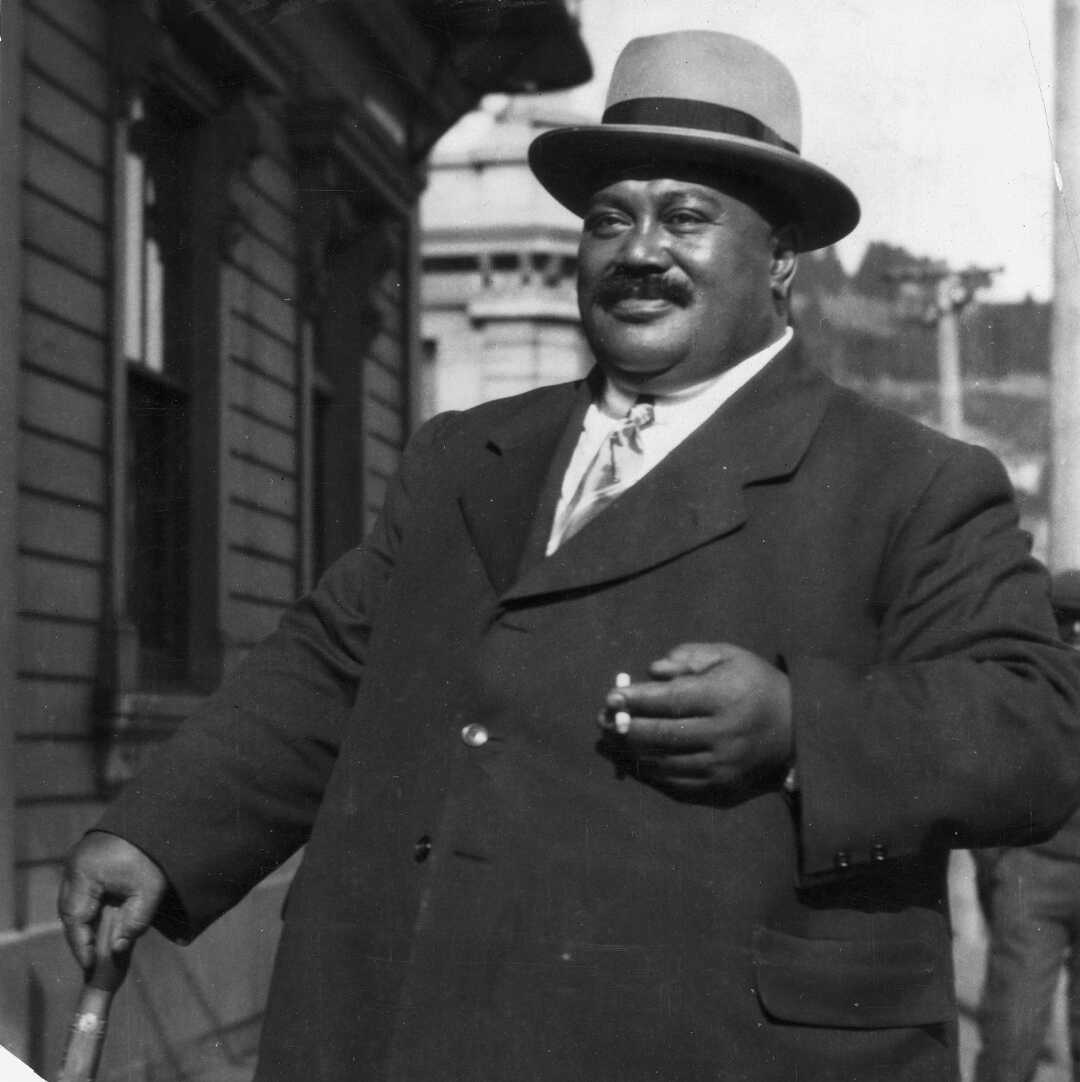
- Solomon in Christchurch in 1925
- Born: Tame Horomona Rehe; 7 May 1884; Waikaripi, Chatham Islands
- Died: 19 March 1933 (aged 48); Manukau, Chatham Islands
- Occupation: Farmer
- Known for: Being the last full-blooded Moriori

Tame Horomona Rehe (7 May 1884 – 19 March 1933), also known by the anglicised name Tommy Solomon, is believed by most to have been the last Moriori of unmixed ancestry. Moriori are the indigenous people of the Chatham Islands.

== Early life ==
Solomon was born on 7 May 1884 at Waikaripi in the Chatham Islands and raised on the Moriori Reserve near Manukau Point and was the only surviving child of his father, Rangitapua Horomona Rehe and his mother, Ihimaera Te Teira, both of whom came from the Ōwenga and Ōtonga Moriori tribes respectively. His mother died in 1903 but because of his youthful irresponsibility the interest in her land was vested in his father during his lifetime.

== Career as farmer ==
Solomon was married in 1903 to Ada Fowler of the Kāi Tahu iwi and began learning the trade of sheep farmer first on leased land and then on the family holding which gradually increased in size as other Moriori families died out. When his father and his wife died in 1915, Solomon was running 7000 sheep and a herd of cattle on the family farm. He remarried in 1916 to Whakarawa, the niece of his first wife and subsequently had five children. During the 1920s Solomon became known as one of the most successful farmers in the Chatham Islands. He took an active part in the social and political life of the Chatham Islands and was widely respected for his generosity and his conciliatory nature; it was as the "last full-blooded Moriori" however that he was best known.

== Family ==
As the Kāi Tahu are a South Island Māori tribe rather than Moriori, Solomon's children were considered of mixed descent. Modern scholars, however, reject the concept of a phylogenetically much distinct Moriori, and instead consider them a culturally distinct offshoot of an early (pre-Kāi Tahu) South Island Māori group, as evidenced by similarities between the Moriori language and the k-dialect of southern Māori. There are still many people of partial Moriori descent both in the Chatham Islands and in mainland New Zealand, and the Moriori are today generally considered a distinct cultural rather than racial entity.

== Death and legacy ==
Solomon died of pneumonia and heart failure on 19 March 1933. Whati Tuuta, the son of his friend George Tuuta, built his coffin. On 29 December 1986, a statue was made and unveiled by Prime Minister David Lange to commemorate him; it can be found at Manukau close to his farm. During the ceremony, Lange stated in his speech that the "Moriori were not a myth. They were, in these islands, a real people. We cannot make them live again, but we can tell the truth about who they were and what happened to them." The statue was later restored in July 2025.
