= Kāti Māmoe =

Māori iwi (tribe) in Aotearoa New Zealand

- Iwi (tribe) in Māoridom
- Rohe (region): South Island
- Population: 3,111

Kāti Māmoe (also spelled Ngāti Māmoe) is a Māori iwi. Originally from the Heretaunga Plains of New Zealand's Hawke's Bay, they moved in the 16th century to the South Island which at the time was already occupied by the Waitaha.

A century later, the Ngāti Māmoe were largely subsequently absorbed via marriage and conquest by Ngāi Tahu, who migrated south in turn.

There are many hapū (sub tribes) that acknowledge Kāti Māmoe as their iwi. They each have their own rūnanga (council).

Many Ngāi Tahu have Ngāti Māmoe links in their whakapapa. In the far south of the island especially, "... southern Māori still think of themselves as Ngai Tahu-Ngati Mamoe, a synthesis of the two tribal groups ...."

According to Edward Shortland, Kāti Māmoe's historical hapū included Kāti Rakai and Kāti Hinekato.

== History ==
=== Early history ===
Kāti Māmoe's descent is said to be traced from the ancestor Hotumāmoe, said to be a descendant of Toi, a great-great-great grandson of Rākaihautū. Hotumāmoe is said to have lived in the Heretaunga District.

Early migration stories say the Ngāti Mamoe were forced out of their home in the Heretaunga, and took refuge in Te Whanganui-a-Tara with the permission of Ngāi Tara's ancestor and namesake, Tara. Later after they had moved down to the South Island, they defeated Waitaha along the east coast under the leadership of Chief Tūtewaimate. His descendants lived on at Rakaia for about six generations.

=== 17th century ===
==== Marukore and Tūhaitara ====
The Ngāi Tahu ancestress Tūhaitara insulting her husband Chief Marukore of Ngāti Mamoe, or Te Kāhea, and his ancestry, as well as various other exchanges are the reason for war between their two tribes. Tūhaitara herself had a degree of Ngāti Mamoe heritage, but Marukore was viewed as below her status. They had 11 children in total, including Tamaraeroa, Huirapa, Tahumatā, Pahirua, and Hinehou.

Tūhaitara instructed Tamaraeroa and Huirapa to kill Marukore at a place called Papanui. However, Marukore knew of their plan and defeated them in the Battle of Hūkete after which their sister Hinehou laid them on the floor of her whare for her grandchildren to see, and left her belongings with them before burning down the building in an incident now known as Kārara Kōpae (The Laying Down of Fighting Chiefs). Alternatively, Marukore himself burned their bodies on a funeral pyre.

Next the brothers Pahirua and Tahumatā sought out to defeat Marukore. As they were about to take advice from a local chief named Rākaimoari, his daughter Hinewai-a-tapu made a remark about Tahumatā which sparked the Battle of Te Pakiaka ('The Roots') that lasted for some days. It was named so because Tahumatā caught Hinewai-a-tapu hiding under some tree roots, and made her his wife.

Eventually the Ngāti Mamoe chief Hikaororoa managed to trap Marukore's party in a whare. Hikaororoa asked for the 'chief of the long plume' to come to the door to be cannibalised. Marukore's younger cousin Rokopaekawa took Marukore's head dress (the sign of status) and was sacrificed instead. However he did not cook properly, and the head dress's plume was still visible in the dirt. This was considered a bad omen and so the body was discarded with the incident being called 'Pikitūroa' ('The Long Standing Feather Plumes')

Marukore and Tūhaitara would both die in the Battle of Tapapanui, at the hands of their son Pahirua who was very angry about the whole situation. In one telling of the series of battles, Hinehou and Pahirua built Kārara Kōpae together, and burnt the bodies of all the slain there. The remaining children of the warring parents would move down to a place called Te Oreorehua in Wairarapa where Hinehou was already living, and southward to Te Whanganui-a-Tara within a few generations, though their descendants are regarded as the senior lines of Ngāi Tahu.

==== Ngāi Tahu's attacks ====
Hikaororoa, a prominent Ngāi Tahu member, attacked Te Mata-ki-kaipoinga pā after his kinsman Tūāhuriri (great-grandson of Tūhaitara) insulted him. Tūtekawa (Tūāhuriri's brother-in-law of senior Ngāti Kahungunu, Ngāti Porou, and Ngāti Mamoe connections) withdrew his men to attack at another angle after his younger relative recognised an insult from Hikaororoa. He sent the same relative to warn Tūāhuriri and to escape, which he did into a nearby bush. For unknown reasons, when Tūtekawa entered the pā, he slew Tūāhuriri's wives Hinekaitaki and Tuarāwhati (Whākuku's sisters). After the battle, Tūtekawa fled down to Waikākahi on the shores of Lake Ellesmere / Te Waihora where he lived amongst his fellow Ngāti Mamoe. His additional family ties included his wife Tūkōrero being a sister to Tūāhuriri’s wife Hinetewai (mother of Hāmua, Tūrakautahi, and Moki). He was also a first cousin to both Ngāi Tahu's Ngāti Kurī chief Te Rakiwhakaputa, and to the Ngāti Mamoe leader Tukiauau.

On one occasion when Ngāti Kurī fought with Rangitāne on the east coast of the South Island, Chief Tūteurutira had mistaken one of his captives, Hinerongo, as one of the enemy's women. She was in fact a member of Ngāti Mamoe who had already been taken captive by Rangitāne, and so he returned her to Matariki Pā on the Waiau Toa / Clarence River. This struck a new alliance between their tribes, after which they successfully attacked Rangitāne in the Wairau Valley. For this Ngāti Mamoe then ceded the east coast regions north of Waiau Toa to Ngāi Tahu, and Tūteurutira and Hinerongo married and settled at the pā.

Ngāti Mamoe also fought against Ngāti Kurī in a battle now called Ōpokihi. At Ngāti Kurī's pā, Pariwhakatau, near the Conway area, Tukiauau sneaked in and killed Manawa-i-waho. Makō-ha-kirikiri and his sisters Te Apai and Tokerau, Manawa-i-waho's wives were spared by the protection of the guardian; however, they were forced to leave the pā underneath her legs (she would have been a wooden figure or carving suspended in the air).

By the 1690s Ngāi Tahu had conquered northern Canterbury, including Ngāti Kurī conquering the east coast down to Kaikōura, and Ngāti Irakehu peaceably settling among Banks Peninsula's Ngāti Mamoe. The last battle that was fought between the two tribes up to this point, was the Battle of Waipapa, before Ngāti Kurī took Takahanga pā.

=== 18th century ===
After establishing dominance down to Kaikōura, many of Ngāi Tahu's leading chiefs were ready to expand further south into the island. Their chief, Moki, had learned of the location of Tūtekawa, who was still living just further south at Te Waihora. Moki set off in his canoe and attacked various small villages including the Parakākāriki pā at Ōtanerito. Tūtekawa was ultimately killed by Whākuku, avenging his sisters. Tūtekawa's son Te Rakitāmau returned to the home, where he found his wife Punahikoia and children unharmed, and the attackers sleeping near the fire. Te Rakitāmau did not avenge his father, but instead left a sign that he spared their lives, and peace was eventually restored between their descendants.

Ngāi Tahu chief Te Rakiwhakaputa destroyed Ngāti Mamoe's pā at Mānuka, across the hills at Taitapu. His son Manuhiri drove out of Ngāti Mamoe Ōhinetahi and set up his base there. Tūāhuriri's second eldest son Tūrakautahi, the chief of Ngāi Tūhaitara, established the Te Kōhaka-a-kaikai-a-waro pā (now Kaiapoi pā) over a Waitaha site at the Taerutu Lagoon near Woodend.

Tūrakautahi's son Kaweriri later travelled with a taua south to Lowther around the year 1725, where the Kāti Mamoe chief Tutemakohu slayed him during the Battle of Waitaramea. Ngāi Tahu's Chief Taoka would push further south to Ōtākou, where he engaged in some of the final battles with Ngāti Mamoe.

One of Ngāti Mamoe's leading chiefs, Te Whetuki (described as covered in wild long hair) was killed around this time near the Waiau River. Two other members, Maka-tawhio and Pani-te-kaka, managed to escape the fighting by way of already being preoccupied looking for eels. Up that same river, the survivors retreated to Lake Te Anau, where they were relentlessly attacked again by Te-hau-tapunui-o-Tū's forces. Chief Pukutahi and many others were slaughtered, with few survivors escaping across the lake on rafts, and disappearing into the mists on the other side. The last pā of Ngāti Māmoe was on Mataura Island.

Over time, marriages had been arranged between the two tribes to cement peace. Notably of Raki-ihia (Ngāti Mamoe) and Hinehākiri, the cousin of Te-hau-tapunui-o-Tū, and of Honekai, son of Te-hau-tapunui-o-Tū, with Raki-ihia's daughter Kohuwai. Despite this, occasional skirmishes still continued. Another chief alive at the time was Te Wera. Tūhawaiki was one famous chief descended from the unions of the tribes.

== Population ==
During the 2013 New Zealand census, 3,111 people, or less than 1% of the total population of Māori descent, were affiliated with the iwi.

Of those, 18.9% identified with no other iwi, and 21.9% could converse in the Māori language. The median age was 34.8 years, 46.4% were male and 53.7% were female. Among those 15 and older, 78.8% held a formal qualification, 44.6% had never been a regular smoker, the median income was $28,000, and 73.4% of those living in cities were employed.

The most common religions held by members of the iwi were Anglican (12.5%), Catholic (9.9%), and Presbyterian, Congregational and Reformed (7.1%). A further 48% had no religion and 6.5% would not specify a religion. By comparison, 3.2% were affiliated with the Rātana movement, and less than 1% were affiliated with the Ringatū religion.

On the night of the Census, 80.6% of people lived in households with only one family, 5.6% lived in households with other families, 9.6% lived in one-person households, and 4.2% lived in flats. On the same night, 55.1 percent of people lived in a two-parent family, 22.8 percent lived in a one-parent family, and 22.0 percent lived as couples without children. There were 1,008 dependent children in the iwi, compared to 939 in 2006. Of these 70.2% of these lived in two-parent families, compared to 66.5 percent in 2006.

== Notable people ==
- Joey Matenga Ashton, railway worker, sportsman, and dance band leader
- Raniera Ellison, fishing company manager
- Christine Harvey, tā moko artist
- Keri Hulme, writer
- Hiria Kokoro-Barrett, tribal leader, craftswoman, and mutton-birder
- Fiona Pardington, artist
- Hāriata Pītini-Morēra, leader, genealogist, historian, conservationist and weaver
- Kiti Karaka Rīwai, leader
- Butler Te Koeti, mountaineer
- Bob Whaitiri, guide, soldier, launch and tug master, factory manager, community leader
