= Hirawanu Tapu =

Moriori leader

Hirawanu Tapu (c. 1824–1900) was a notable New Zealand Moriori leader. He was born in Te Awapatiki, Chatham Islands, New Zealand. He was a major source for Alexander Shand's works on Moriori history, traditions, chants and vocabulary, and about 90 percent of all extant knowledge of his people's culture and language passed through his hands.
