= Kiti Karaka Rīwai =

Moriori and Ngati Mamoe; founding mother

- Born: 12 September 1870; Ruapuke Island, Southland, New Zealand
- Died: 21 January 1927 (aged 56); Greytown, New Zealand
- Occupation: Tribal leader
- Notable work: Wairua meeting house (1890s)
- Spouse(s): Rīwai Te Ropiha (div.1900s), Te Ao Ahitana Matenga (Joseph Ashton)
- Children: 10
- Parents: Arapetere Karaka (Albert Clark) (father); Mary (née Owen) (mother)

Kiti Karaka Rīwai (12 September 1870 – 21 January 1927) (also known as Kiti Karaka, Catherine Clark, Kate Clark, Kitty Clark, Kiti Karaka Te Ao Ahitana, or Kiti Ashton) was a New Zealand tribal leader. She was born in Ruapuke Island, Southland, New Zealand in 1870, to parents Arapetere Karaka (Albert Clark) and Mary (née Owen).

Of Māori and Moriori descent, she identified with the Kāti Māmoe iwi. Her first husband was Riwai Te Ropiha, a Moriori of the Chatham Islands, with whom she had nine children before divorcing in the early 1900s. Her second husband was Te Ao Ahitana Matenga (Joseph Ashton) of Ngāti Kahungunu, with whom she had one child, Joey Ashton.

She helped build the meeting house in Wairua in the 1890s. She died in Greytown in 1927.
