= Raniera Ellison =

New Zealand fishing company manager

Raniera Ellison (13 February 1915–29 March 1974) was a New Zealand fishing company manager. He was born on 13 February 1915 and is of Ngāi Tahu and Kāti Māmoe descent.
