= Lowther, New Zealand =

Lowther
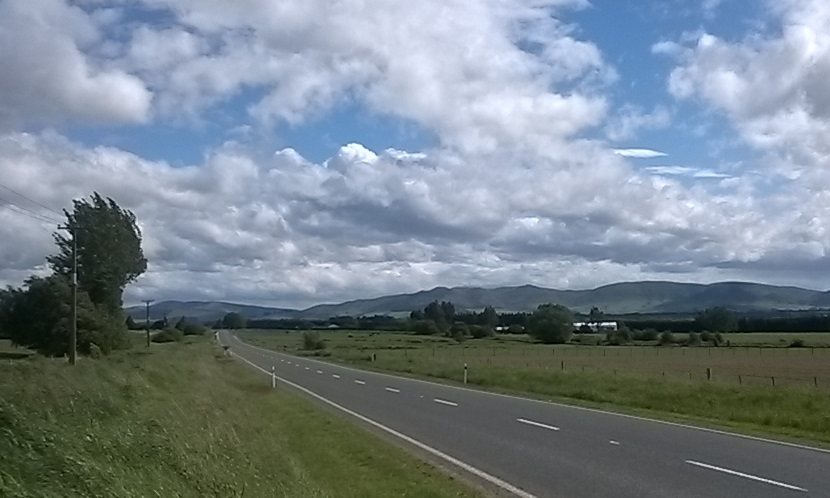
- Lowther in 2015

- Location within New Zealand
- Coordinates: 45°39.4′S 168°26.1′E
- Country: New Zealand
- Island: South Island
- Region: Southland region
- Territorial authority: Southland District
- Time zone: UTC+12 (NZST)
  - Summer (DST): UTC+13 (NZDT)
- Postcode(s): 9793
- Area code: 03
- Local iwi: Ngāi Tahu

Lowther is a locality in Southland, New Zealand, at the south-eastern corner of the Five Rivers Plain. It lies on State Highway 6, 8 km (5 miles) north of Lumsden. To its east rises Lowther Peak (912 m), named by John Turnbull Thomson, from which the name of the locality comes. Thomson had named the peak after local runholder Thomas Lowther Barnhill. His mother's family, the Lowthers, came from the Strabane area of Northern Ireland.

Beside State Highway 6 is a memorial cairn commemorating the Battle of Waitaramea. Around 1725, Kaweriri led a large party of Ngāi Tahu from Canterbury with the intention of destroying the Kāti Māmoe of Otago and Southland. In an ensuing engagement with a smaller group of Kāti Māmoe the leader of the latter, Tutemakohu, managed to kill Kaweriri, before he and his party escaped into fog. Having also lost other leaders in the fight the Ngāi Tahu force retreated back home.

The township of Lowther was surveyed by J. A. McArthur in 1863. A police station and lock-up were established there, and later a courthouse was built. The first policeman in the district was Constable Malone. Two hotels were established in the township, the last closing after flood damage in 1912.

The Kingston Branch Railway opened to Lowther, where a siding was built, on 15 January 1877, and for a year it was the temporary terminus of the line. With the opening of the railway Lumsden became the commercial centre of the district and Lowther declined in importance. In 1879 the police station, lock-up and court were all shifted to Lumsden. The lock-up has been restored and has been placed next to Lumsden's old railway station. The railway closed on 26 November 1979. The Around the Mountains Cycle Trail now follows the old trackline.

== Climate ==
Climate data for Five Rivers CWS (1991–2020)
Month	Jan	Feb	Mar	Apr	May	Jun	Jul	Aug	Sep	Oct	Nov	Dec	Year
Mean daily maximum °C (°F)	20.2 (68.4)	19.9 (67.8)	18.0 (64.4)	15.0 (59.0)	12.4 (54.3)	9.6 (49.3)	8.8 (47.8)	10.5 (50.9)	12.9 (55.2)	14.8 (58.6)	16.7 (62.1)	18.8 (65.8)	14.8 (58.6)
Daily mean °C (°F)	14.5 (58.1)	14.1 (57.4)	12.2 (54.0)	9.9 (49.8)	7.6 (45.7)	4.9 (40.8)	4.1 (39.4)	5.6 (42.1)	7.8 (46.0)	9.6 (49.3)	11.3 (52.3)	13.3 (55.9)	9.6 (49.2)
Mean daily minimum °C (°F)	8.9 (48.0)	8.4 (47.1)	6.4 (43.5)	4.7 (40.5)	2.8 (37.0)	0.1 (32.2)	−0.6 (30.9)	0.8 (33.4)	2.8 (37.0)	4.5 (40.1)	6.0 (42.8)	7.8 (46.0)	4.4 (39.9)
Source: NIWA
