= Hāriata Pītini-Morēra =

New Zealand Māori tribal leader (died 1938)

Hāriata Whakatau Pītini-Morēra (died 1938) was a New Zealand Māori leader, genealogist, historian and conservationist. Tipene O'Regan called her "the most important leader of Ngāti Kurī", a subtribe (hapū) of Ngāi Tahu in the South Island. With her husband Hoani Pītini-Morēra she was responsible for the preservation of many culturally important sites through the South Island, including burial grounds. She was well regarded for her knowledge of traditional weaving and also fought to preserve harakeke-growing areas.

Pītini-Morēra was born in Little River, North Canterbury, probably in 1871 or 72, to Hāriata Whakatau and John Hampstead. Ngāi Tahu and Kāti Māmoe iwi. She married Hoani Pītini-Morēra (John Beaton-Morel) around 1890. Hariata Whakatau Pitini-Morera was the grandmother of Wharetutu Te Aroha Stirling, a notable New Zealand tribal leader and conservationist.

She died in Kaikōura, 2 April 1938.
