= Joey Matenga Ashton =

New Zealand dance band leader (1907–1993)

Joey Matenga Ashton (3 June 1907–8 November 1993) was a New Zealand railway worker, sportsman, and dance band leader. Of Moriori and Māori descent, he identified with the Ngāti Kahungunu and Kāti Māmoe iwi. He was born in Greytown, Wairarapa, New Zealand on 3 June 1907. He was the son of Te Ao Ahitana Matenga (Joseph Ashton) and Kiti Karaka Rīwai.
