= Wharetutu Te Aroha Stirling =

Wharetutu Te Aroha Stirling (28 January 1924 – 31 March 1993) was a notable New Zealand tribal leader and conservationist. Of Māori descent, she identified with the Ngāi Tahu iwi. She was a major participant in the Ngāi Tahu Treaty of Waitangi claim and settlement process. She was born in Lyttelton, North Canterbury, New Zealand in 1924.

Stirling was the granddaughter of Hāriata Pītini-Morēra. Her brother was tribal elder Bill Solomon.

Stirling's written works were collected and published.
