= Hiria Kokoro-Barrett =

New Zealand tribal leader and craftswoman

Hiria Kokoro-Barrett (3 June 1870–1943) was a New Zealand tribal leader, craftswoman, and mutton-birder. Of Māori descent, she identified with the Ngāi Tahu and Kāti Māmoe iwi. She was born in Tuahiwi, North Canterbury, New Zealand on 3 June 1870.
