= Moriori language =

Extinct and revived Austronesian language

Moriori
- Ta Rē Moriori
- Native to: New Zealand
- Region: Polynesia
- Ethnicity: Moriori
- Extinct: 1898, with the death of Hirawanu Tapu
- Revival: Revitalisation ongoing (2014)
- Language family: Austronesian: Malayo-Polynesian; Oceanic; Polynesian; Eastern Polynesian; Tahitic; Māori–Moriori; Moriori
- Writing system: Latin

Language codes
- ISO 639-3: rrm
- Glottolog: mori1267

Moriori, or ta rē Moriori ('the Moriori language'), is a Polynesian language most closely related to New Zealand Māori. It is spoken by the Moriori, the indigenous people of New Zealand's Chatham Islands (Rēkohu in Moriori), an archipelago located east of the South Island. Moriori went extinct as a first language at the turn of the 20th century, but revitalisation attempts are ongoing.

Moriori is a Polynesian language that diverged from Māori dialects after centuries of isolation, while still remaining mutually intelligible. The language has a guttural diction and consistent suppression of terminal vowels, meaning that, unlike in Māori, words may end in consonants.

== History ==
The Chatham Islands' first European contact was on 29 November 1791 with the visit of HMS Chatham, captained by William Broughton. The crew landed in Waitangi harbour and claimed the island for Britain.

The genocide of the Moriori people by mainland Māori iwi (tribes) Ngāti Mutunga and Ngāti Tama occurred during the autumn of 1835. Approximately 300 were killed, around one-sixth of the original population. Of those who survived, some were kept as slaves, and some were subsequently eaten. The Moriori were not permitted to marry other Moriori or have children, which endangered their survival and their language. The impact on the Moriori population, culture, and language was so severe that by 1862, only 101 Moriori remained alive. By the 1870s few spoke the language.

The three principal documents on which knowledge of the Moriori language is now based are a manuscript petition written in 1862 by a group of surviving Moriori elders to Governor George Grey; a vocabulary of Moriori words collected by Samuel Deighton, Resident Magistrate from 1873 to 1891, published in 1887; and a collection of Moriori texts made by Alexander Shand and published in 1911.

The death of the Moriori language went unrecorded, but Johann Friedrich Wilhelm Baucke (1848–1931) was the last man who could speak it.

Samuel Deighton's vocabulary of Moriori words was republished as an appendix of Michael King's Moriori: A People Rediscovered (1989).

The language was reconstructed for Barry Barclay's 2000 film documentary The Feathers of Peace, in a recreation of Moriori contact with Pākehā and Māori.

=== Revival ===
In 2001, as part of a cultural revival movement, Moriori people began attempts to revive the language and compiled a database of Moriori words. There is a POLLEX (Polynesian Lexicon Project Online) database of Moriori words as well. A language app is available for Android devices.

The 2006 New Zealand census showed 945 people choosing to include "Moriori" amongst their tribal affiliations, compared to 35 people in the 1901 census. In the 2013 New Zealand census the number of people who identified as having Moriori ancestry declined to 738, however members of the imi (Moriori equivalent for iwi) estimate the population to be as many as 3,500.

In 2021 an app called Ta Rē Moriori was launched to teach the Moriori language to as many new people as possible.

In 2023, there was a petition for the establishment of a Moriori Language Week. In November 2025, the Hokotehi Moriori Trust ran the first Moriori language week.

In 2024, author Kate Preece published a trilingual children's book: Ten Nosey Weka, featuring words in English, Māori and Moriori.

In 2026, for Moriori Language Week, Hokotehi Moriori Trust released "Tupukapuka Mahi", an activity book for children that teaches basic Moriori vocabulary and grammar, on their website.

== Classification ==
=== Comparison with Māori ===
Words in Moriori often have different vowels from their Māori counterparts.

The preposition a in Moriori corresponds to e in Māori, the preposition ka to ki, eriki to ariki (lord, chief), reimata to roimata (tear), wihine to wahine (woman), and so forth.

Sometimes a vowel is dropped before a consonant such as na (ena), ha (aha) and after a consonant like rangat (rangata), nawen (nawene), hok (hoki), or (oro), and mot (motu), thus leaving a closed syllable. In this regard, it is similar to the Southern dialects of Māori, in which apocope is occasionally found. A vowel is also sometimes dropped after a vowel in the case the preceding vowel is lengthened and sometimes before a vowel, where the remaining vowel is lengthened.

The consonants [k], [h], and [t] can sometimes be aspirated and palatalised, such as Motchuhar instead of Motuhara.

== Orthography ==
Like Māori, written Moriori uses the Latin script, with macrons to denote lengthened vowels:

- a - [a]
- e - [ɛ]
- i - [i]
- o - [ɔ]
- u - [y]
- ā - [aː]
- ē - [ɛː]
- ī - [iː]
- ō - [ɔː]
- ū - [yː]
- p - [p]
- t - [t]
- k - [k]
- m - [m]
- n - [n]
- ng - [ŋ]
- wh - [ɸ]
- h - [h]
- w - [w]
- r - [r]
- tch - [tʃ]
- ch - [ʃ]
- v
- g

Note: Shand includes a 'v' in the Moriori language, however, none of the Moriori words captured by Deighton and Baucke feature a 'v'. Shand also describes the rounded high vowel written 'u' as similar to the French phoneme /y/, and is said to be different from the phoneme reflected in Māori.
