= Alexander Shand (ethnologist) =

Alexander Shand (1840–1910) was a New Zealand farmer, interpreter and ethnographer, notable for his work on the Moriori people of the Chatham Islands, their culture and language. He was born in Petone, Wellington, New Zealand in 1840. His views on "sentiment" influenced William McDougall's theory of instinct.
