= Moriori =

Indigenous Polynesian people of the Chatham Islands

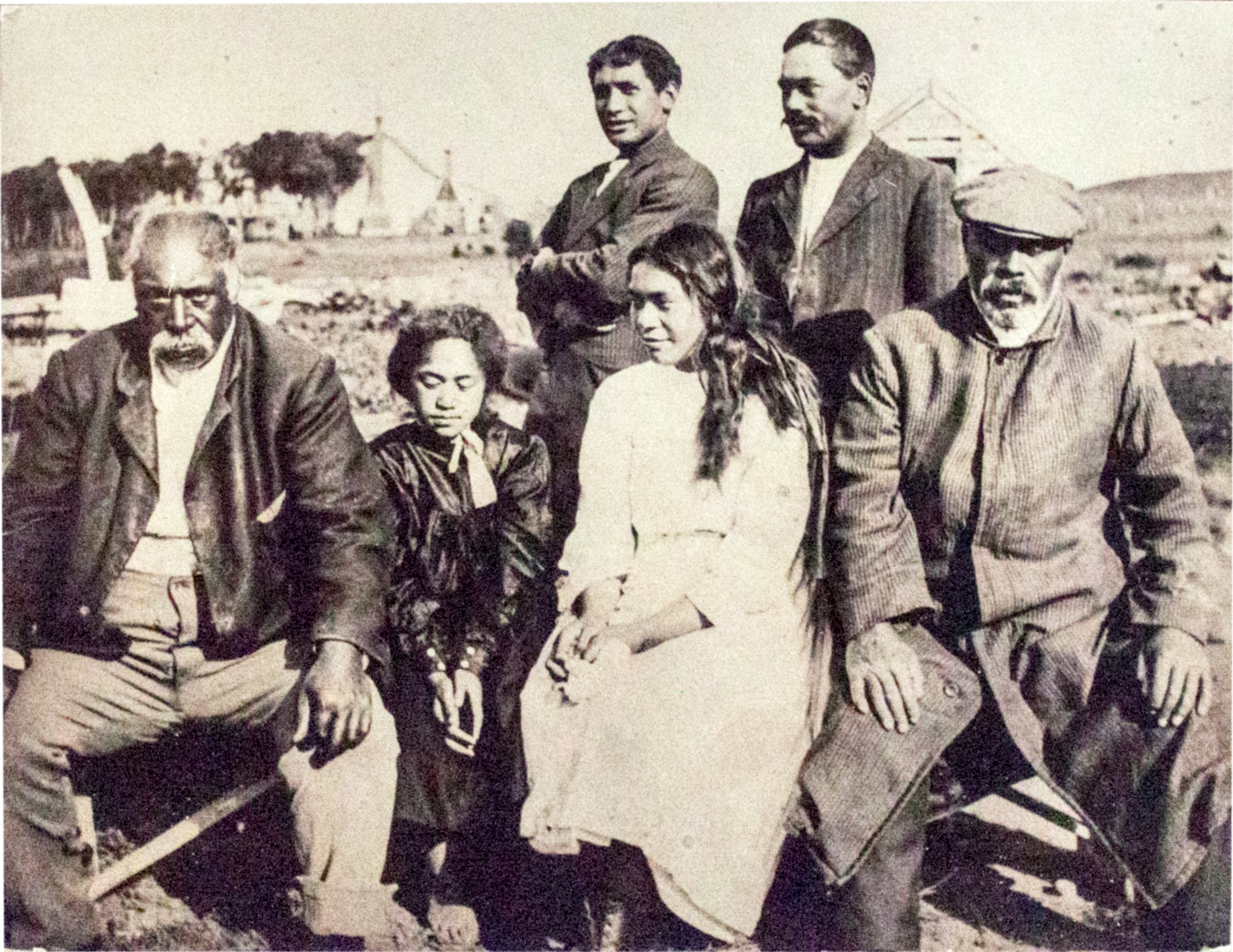
- Moriori family, c. 1910

Total population
- approx. 1,000 (2018 census)

Regions with significant populations
- Chatham Islands: 36 (2013 census)
- North Island: 354 (2013 census)
- South Island: 348 (2013 census)

Languages
- English, Māori, Moriori

Religion
- Christianity including Rātana

Related ethnic groups
- Māori people, other Polynesian peoples, Austronesian peoples Map of the Chatham Islands. Chatham Island is the largest, Pitt Island the second largest, and South East Island the small island to the right of Pitt.

The Moriori are the indigenous people of the Chatham Islands (Rēkohu in Moriori; Wharekauri in Māori). They are Polynesians who came from the New Zealand mainland by at least 1500 AD, and possibly around the mid-15th century, likely with some earlier immigration directly from East Polynesia. The settlers' culture diverged from mainland Māori, and they developed a distinct Moriori language, mythology, artistic expression and way of life. The population of Moriori was recorded as being 1,806 in 2023, most of whom did not live on the Chatham Islands. During the late 19th century some prominent anthropologists proposed that Moriori were pre-Māori settlers of mainland New Zealand, and possibly Melanesian in origin; this hypothesis has been discredited by archaeologists since the early 20th century, but continued to be referred to by critics of the Treaty of Waitangi settlement process into the 21st century.

Early Moriori formed tribal groups based on eastern Polynesian social customs and organisation. Later, a prominent pacifist culture emerged; this was known as the law of nunuku, based on the teachings of the 16th century Moriori leader Nunuku-whenua. This culture made it easier for Taranaki Māori invaders to massacre them in the 1830s during the Musket Wars, and resulting in the Moriori genocide, in which the Moriori were either murdered or enslaved by members of the Ngāti Mutunga and Ngāti Tama iwi, killing or displacing nearly 95% of the Moriori population.

The Moriori, however, were not extinct, and gained recognition as New Zealand's second indigenous people during the next century. Their culture and language underwent a revival, and Moriori names for their islands were prioritised. In February 2020, the New Zealand government signed a treaty with tribal leaders, giving them rights enshrined in law and the Moriori people at large an apology for the past actions of Māori and European settlers. The Crown returned stolen remains of those killed in the genocide, and gifted NZ$18 million in reparations. On 23 November 2021, the New Zealand government passed in law the treaty between Moriori and the Crown. The law is called the Moriori Claims Settlement Act. It includes an agreed summary history that begins with the words "Moriori karāpuna (ancestors) were the waina-pono (original inhabitants) of Rēkohu, Rangihaute, Hokorereoro (South East Island), and other nearby islands (making up the Chatham Islands). They arrived sometime between 1000 and 1400 AD."

== History ==
=== Origin ===
Moriori tradition and some artefacts suggest that the earliest settlers of the Chatham Islands may have come directly from East Polynesia. The Chathams are no further from Rarotonga than the Coromandel coast is, and it is possible that they were initially settled during the Polynesian exploration of the South Pacific. However, it is clear from archaeological and linguistic evidence that the bulk of the Polynesian settlement came from mainland New Zealand, from the population that also gave rise to the Māori. Artefacts include obsidian from Mayor Island and argillite from Nelson-Marlborough. The Moriori language is closer to Māori than to any other Polynesian language, and the two languages share innovations absent from other Polynesian languages.

The time of human arrival in the Chathams is uncertain. It was by at least about 1500 AD, which is the earliest that cultural remains have been radiocarbon dated to, but artefacts similar to ones that were found in mainland New Zealand and are a century or more older suggest that it was probably earlier. Richards (2019) assumed that it was between 1400 and 1500, and proposed that it was around 1450. The combination of linguistic and skeletal similarities with Māori of the South Island, and prevailing winds and currents, suggest the settlers likely came from south of Cook Strait. Writer Michael King suggested that Moriori likely lack genetic diversity, which points to there being only one arrival, possibly with just one canoe. Further guesswork points to that arrival being a trading canoe or canoes (not war canoes; women must have been on board) from the far south that was blown off course while travelling northwards: it could have been taken eastward along the existing ocean current to the Chathams. Archaeological discoveries imply they settled first on Pitt Island before moving to Chatham Island. The Chathams seem to be the last Polynesian islands to have been settled. The remnants of an oceangoing waka were discovered in August 2024 on the northern coast of Chatham Island and has been dated to around 1440 to 1470.

Most of what else is known about the pre-contact Moriori, their culture and language is a matter of conjecture, because so much evidence has been lost. After the 1835 Māori invasion, all Moriori were either killed, died of newly introduced diseases, or were enslaved, and the language and culture of the survivors became intermingled with the Māori language and society before records were made by Europeans.

=== Adapting to local conditions ===
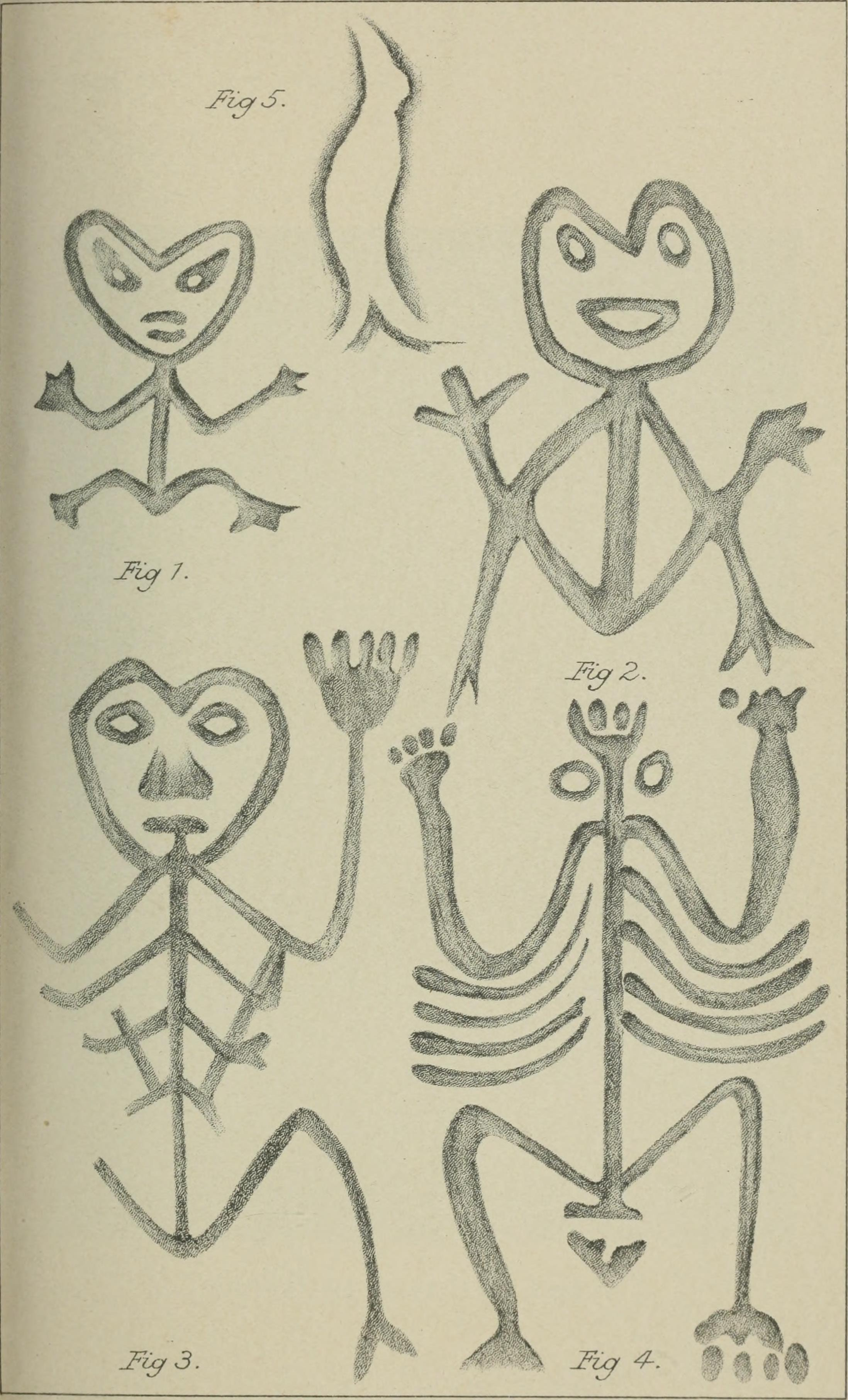
Moriori designs carved into trees and rock

The Chathams are colder and less hospitable than the land the original settlers left behind, and although abundant in resources, these were different from those available where they had come from. The Chathams proved unsuitable for the cultivation of most crops known to Polynesians, and the Moriori adopted a hunter-gatherer lifestyle. Food was almost entirely marine-sourced – protein and fat from fish, fur seals, and the fatty young of sea birds. The islands supported about 2,000 people. This lifestyle is confirmed by early European accounts, with one recording that:

They were idle in the extreme, only seeking food when pressed by hunger, and depending mostly on what was cast ashore by the sea, a stranded whale, grampus, or porpoise being an especial delicacy, as was also a seal or mass of whale blubber, which being often cast ashore was looked upon as the gift of a good spirit who supplied their wants.

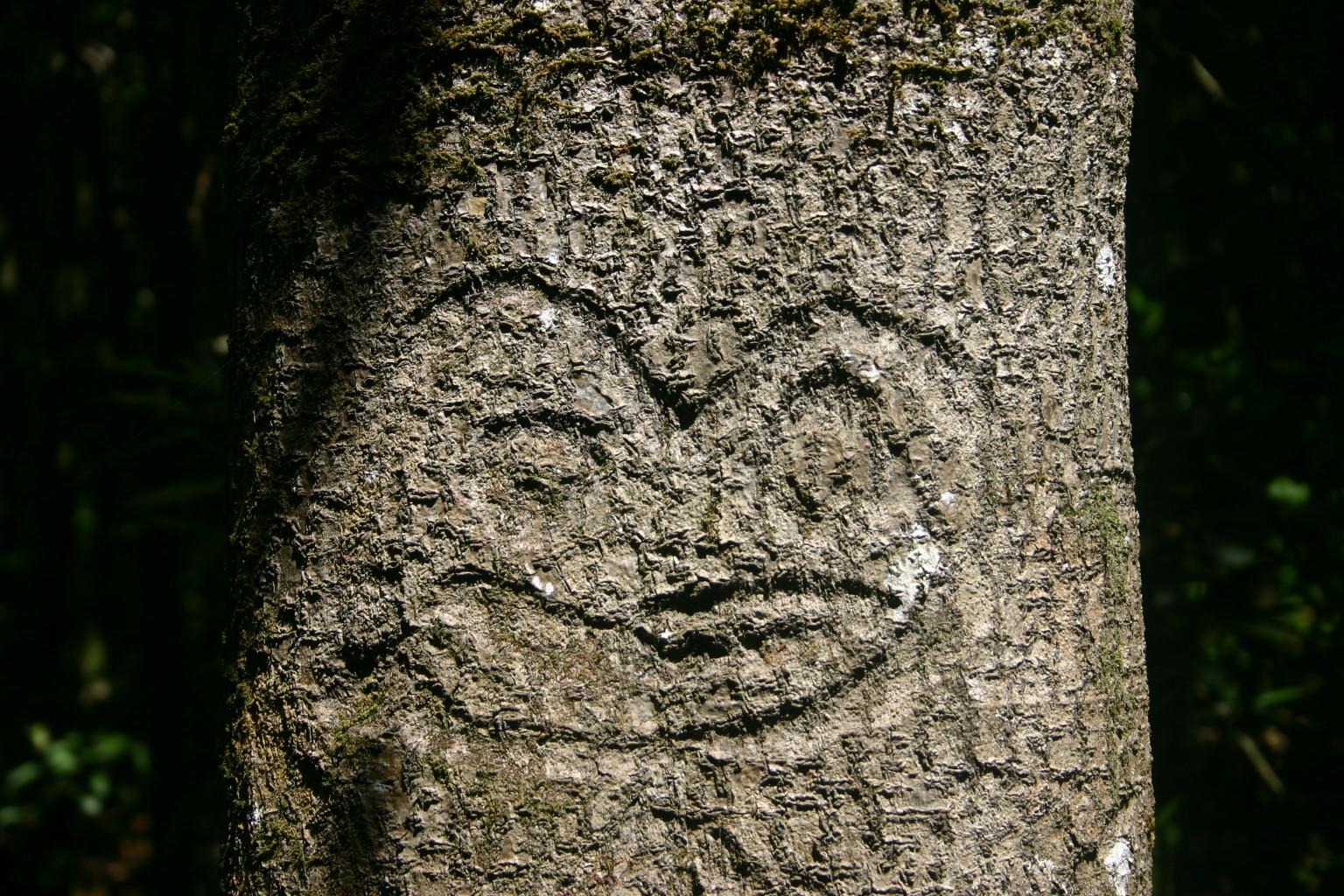
Moriori tree carving or dendroglyph

Lacking resources of cultural significance such as greenstone and plentiful timber, they found outlets for their ritual needs in the carving of dendroglyphs (incisions into tree trunks, called rakau momori). Typically, most Moriori dendroglyphs depict a human form, but there are also other patterns depicting fish and birds. Some of these carvings are protected by the Hāpūpū / J M Barker Historic Reserve.

As a small and precarious population, Moriori embraced a pacifist culture that rigidly avoided warfare, replacing it with dispute resolution in the form of ritual fighting and conciliation. The ban on warfare and cannibalism is attributed to their ancestor Nunuku-whenua.

... because men get angry and during such anger feel the will to strike, that so they may, but only with a rod the thickness of a thumb, and one stretch of the arms length, and thrash away, but that on an abrasion of the hide, or first sign of blood, all should consider honour satisfied.

— Oral tradition

This enabled the Moriori to preserve what limited resources they had in their harsh climate, avoiding waste through warfare. However, this lack of training in warfare also led to their later near-destruction at the hands of invading North Island Māori.

Moriori castrated some male infants in order to control population growth.

=== European contact (1791–1835) ===
The Moriori lived in isolation from the outside world until 1791, when the first Europeans arrived. They were the crew of HMS Chatham, which arrived by chance on 29 November 1791 while on its voyage to the northern Pacific from England, via Dusky Sound. The Chatham's captain, William R. Broughton, named the island after John Pitt, 2nd Earl of Chatham and claimed it for Great Britain. The landing party came to shore in Kaingaroa Harbour on the far Northeast coast of Chatham Island. The Moriori retreated into the forest when the Europeans landed. Seventy years later the Europeans would be recalled in Moriori oral tradition as containing the god of fire, given the pipes they were smoking, and likely female from the clothes they were wearing. It was this interpretation that led to the men returning from the forest to meet the landing party. A brief period of hostility was quickly calmed by the crew putting gifts on the end of Moriori spears, though attempts at trade were unsuccessful. After exploring the area for water the crew again became fearful of Moriori aggression. Some misunderstanding led to an escalation of violence and one Moriori was shot and killed. HMS Chatham then left the island with all its crew. Both the diary of Broughton and local oral tradition record that both sides regretted the incident and to some extent blamed themselves for overreacting.

It was this regret in part that led to good relations when the next ships arrived in the islands sometime between 1804 and 1807. They were sealers from Sydney and word of their welcome soon gave the Moriori a reputation of being friendly. During this time at least one Moriori visited the New Zealand mainland and returned home with knowledge of the Māori. As more ships came, sealing gangs were also left behind on the islands for months at a time. Sealers and whalers soon made the islands a centre of their activities, competing for resources with the native population. Pigs and potatoes were introduced to the islands. However, the seals that had religious significance and provided food and clothing to the Moriori were all but wiped out. European men intermarried with Moriori. Māori arrivals created their own village at Wharekauri which became the Māori name for the Chatham Islands.

The local population was estimated at 1,600 in the mid-1830s with about 10% and 20% of the population having died from infectious diseases such as influenza.

=== Invasion by Taranaki Māori (1835–1868) ===
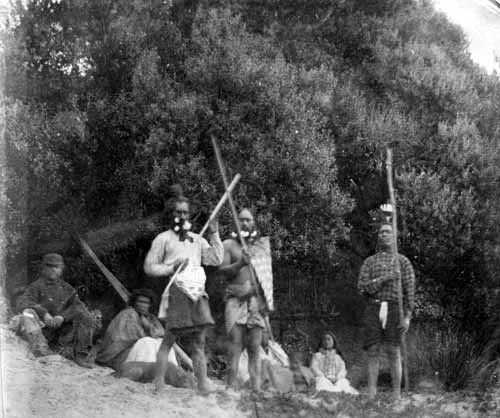
Moriori people in the late 19th century: these three men (standing) are wearing a mix of traditional and European clothing. They carry defensive staffs and wear flax mats around the waist and shoulders, feathers on the front of the head, and albatross tufts in their beards.

In 1835 some Ngāti Mutunga and Ngāti Tama, originally from Taranaki, but living in Wellington for about a decade, invaded the Chathams. On 19 November 1835, the brig Lord Rodney, a hijacked European ship, arrived carrying 500 Māori with guns, clubs and axes, and loaded with 78 tonnes of potatoes for planting, followed by another load, by the same ship, of 400 more Taranaki Māori on 5 December 1835. With the arrival of the second group "parties of warriors armed with muskets, clubs and tomahawks, led by their chiefs, walked through Moriori tribal territories and settlements without warning, permission or greeting. If the districts were wanted by the invaders, they curtly informed the inhabitants that their land had been taken and the Moriori living there were now vassals."

A hui or council of all Moriori men was convened at the settlement called Te Awapatiki. Despite knowing that the Māori did not share their pacifism, and despite the argument by younger men that the principle of Nunuku was not appropriate now, two chiefs – Tapata and Torea – declared that "the law of Nunuku was not a strategy for survival, to be varied as conditions changed; it was a moral imperative." Although this council decided in favour of peace, the invading Māori inferred it was a prelude to war, as was common practice during the Musket Wars. This precipitated a massacre, most complete in the Waitangi area, followed by an enslavement of the Moriori survivors.

A Moriori survivor recalled: "[The Taranaki invaders] commenced to kill us like sheep.... [We] were terrified, fled to the bush, concealed ourselves in holes underground, and in any place to escape our enemies. It was of no avail; we were discovered and killed – men, women and children indiscriminately." A Taranaki Māori conqueror explained, "We took possession... in accordance with our customs and we caught all the people. Not one escaped....." The invaders ritually killed some 10% of the population. Stakes were driven into some of the women, who were left to die in pain.

During the following enslavement the Taranaki Māori invaders forbade the speaking of the Moriori language. They forced Moriori to desecrate their sacred sites by urinating and defecating on them. Moriori were forbidden to marry Moriori or the Taranaki Māori, or to have children with each other. This was different from the customary form of slavery practised on mainland New Zealand. However, many Moriori women had children by their Māori masters. A small number of Moriori women eventually married either Māori or European men. Some were taken from the Chathams and never returned. In 1842 a small party of Māori and their Moriori slaves migrated to the subantarctic Auckland Islands, surviving for some 20 years on sealing and flax growing. Only 101 Moriori out of a population of about 2,000 were left alive by 1862, making the Moriori genocide one of the deadliest in history by percentage of the victim group.

=== Dispersal and assimilation ===
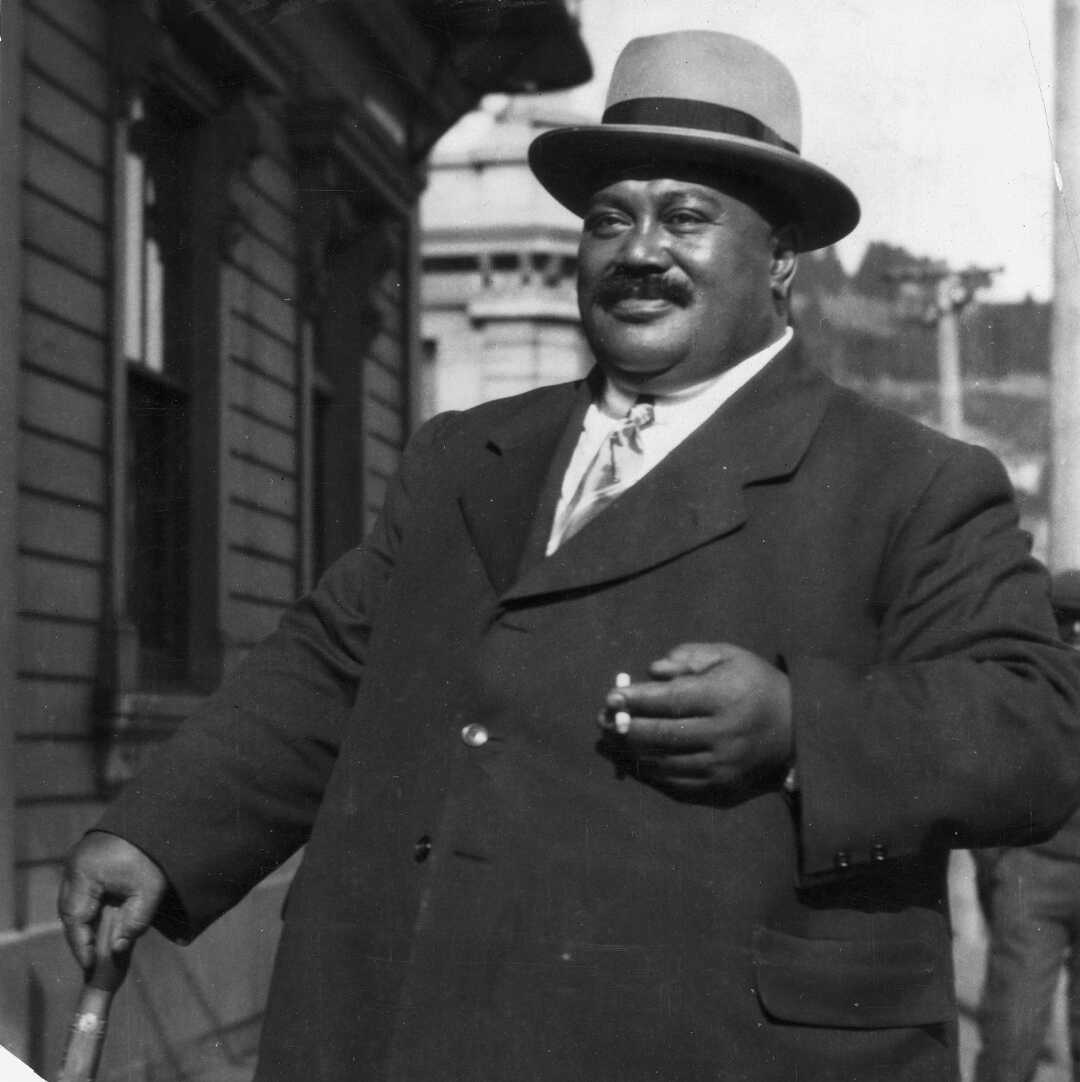
Tommy Solomon, acknowledged as the last Moriori of unmixed ancestry

The Moriori were free from slavery by the end of the 1860s which gave them opportunities for self determination, but their small population led to a gradual dilution of their culture. Only a handful of men still understood the Moriori language and culture from before the invasion. The younger generation spoke Māori, while still identifying themselves as Moriori. While attempts were made to record the Moriori culture for posterity, it was generally believed that it would never again be a living way of life. By 1900 there would only be twelve people in the Chatham Islands who identified themselves as Moriori. Although the last Moriori of unmixed ancestry, Tommy Solomon, died in 1933, there are several thousand mixed ancestry Moriori alive today.

In the 2001 New Zealand census, 585 people identified as Moriori. The population increased to 942 in the 2006 census and declined to 738 in the 2013 census. The 2018 census estimated the Moriori population as 996.

=== Waitangi Tribunal claim ===
In the late 1980s some Moriori descendants made claims against the New Zealand government through the Waitangi Tribunal. The Tribunal is charged with making recommendations on claims brought by Māori relating to actions or omissions of the Crown in the period since 1840 that breach the promises made in the Treaty of Waitangi. These claims were the first time the Tribunal had to choose between competing claims of two indigenous groups. The main focus of the claim was the British annexation of the islands in 1842, the inaction of the Government to reports of Moriori being kept in slavery and the awarding of 97% of the islands to Ngāti Mutunga in 1870 by the Native Land Court.

In 1992, while the Moriori claim was active, the Sealords fisheries deal ceded a third of New Zealand's fisheries to Māori, but prevented any further treaty fishery claims. This occurred against the backdrop of Māori, Moriori and Pākehā Chatham Islanders all competing for fishing rights, while working together to exclude international and mainland interests. Therefore, it was believed that the result of the Tribunal's verdict on the ownership of the Chatham Islands may improve the Moriori ability to acquire some of the allotted fishing rights from the Sealords deal. The Moriori claims were heard between May 1994 and March 1996 and the verdict was strongly in favour of the Moriori case.

This led to an NZ$18 million deal between the Crown and Moriori in 2017. The two parties signed a Deed of Settlement on 13 August 2019. In November 2021, the New Zealand Parliament passed the Moriori Claims Settlement Bill, which completed the Treaty of Waitangi process of the Moriori. Under the terms of the legislation, the settlement package includes a formal Crown apology, the transfer of culturally and spiritually significant lands to Moriori as cultural redress, financial compensation of NZ$18 million, and shared redress such as the vesting of 50 percent of Te Whanga Lagoon.

== Culture and marae ==
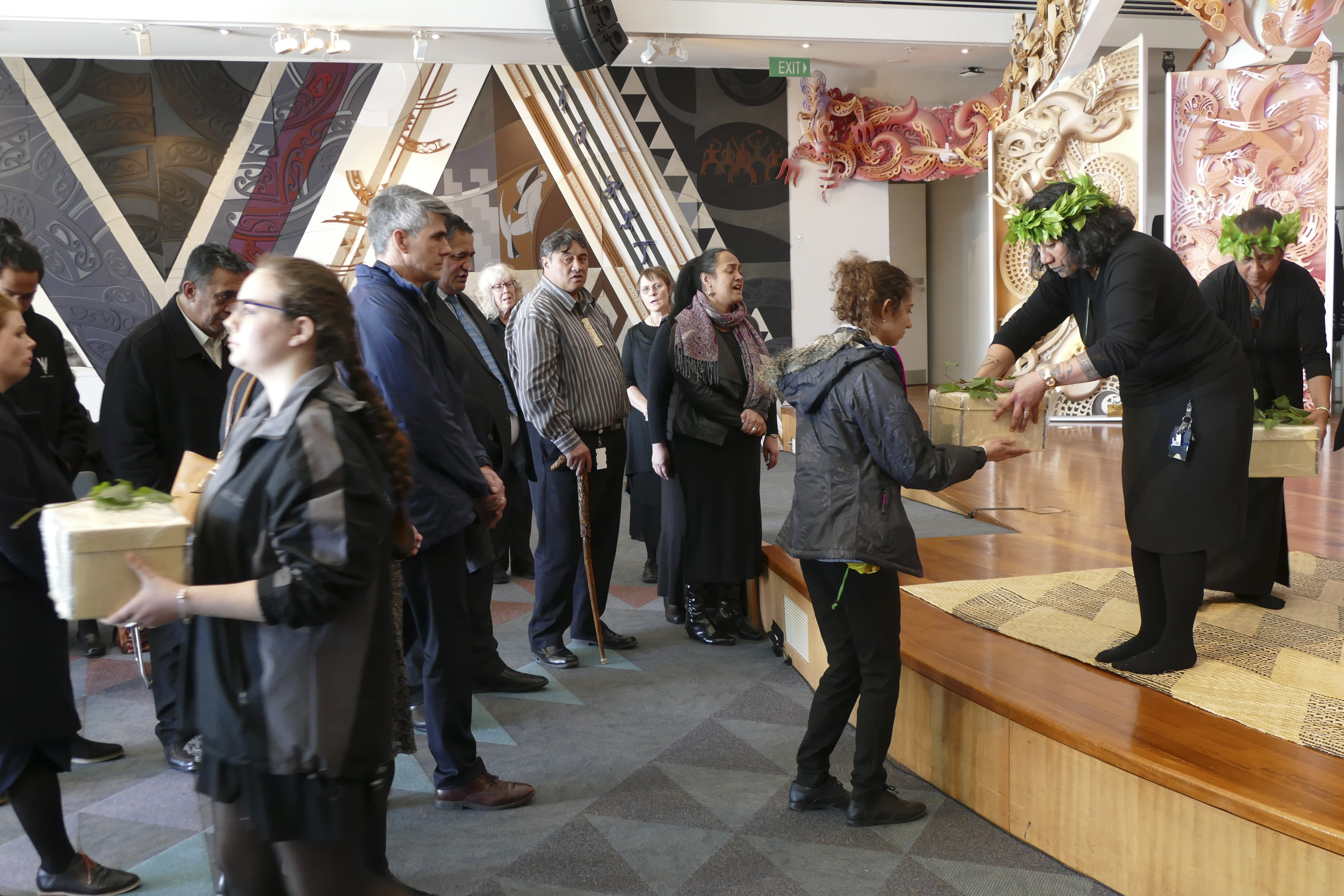
A repatriation ceremony at Te Papa, bringing home Māori and Moriori skeletal remains that were removed from New Zealand in the 19th century (2018)

Today, despite the difficulties that the Moriori have faced, their culture is enjoying a renaissance, both in the Chatham Islands and New Zealand's mainland. This has been symbolised with the renewal of the Covenant of Peace at the new Kōpinga marae in January 2005 on Chatham Island. As of 2016, the marae has registered almost 800 Moriori descendants, with more than 3000 associated children. The Kopinga meeting place and Hokomenetai meeting house are based in the town of Waitangi, also on Chatham Island.

In 2001, work began on preserving the vocabulary and songs of the Moriori people. They also received a $6 million grant from the Government to preserve their culture and language. The albatross remains important in Moriori culture: it is seen in the design of the Kōpinga marae and its feathers are worn in the hair of some Moriori as a sign of peace. The relationship between the Moriori and Ngāti Mutunga is improving, and non-violence remains a cornerstone of the Moriori self image.

In 2002, land on the east coast of Chatham Island was purchased by the Crown (the Taia property). It is now a reserve and jointly managed by Moriori and the Crown. The Moriori are also actively involved with preserving the rakau momori (tree carvings) on the islands.

== Language ==
The now extinct Moriori language was Eastern Polynesian and closely related to Māori and Cook Island Māori with which it was mutually intelligible. It shared about 70% of its vocabulary with Māori; however, there were significant differences in grammar and pronunciation. There are modern attempts at creating learning materials to ensure the survival of what remains of the language.

== Political organisation ==
In 2001, the two main political groups of Moriori united to form the Hokotehi Moriori Trust; however, some internal disputes remain. The New Zealand Government recognises the Hokotehi Moriori Trust as having the mandate to represent Moriori in Treaty of Waitangi settlement negotiations. It is also a mandated iwi organisation under the Māori Fisheries Act 2004 and a recognised iwi aquaculture organisation in the Māori Commercial Aquaculture Claims Settlement Act 2004. The trust represents Moriori as an "iwi authority" for resource consents under the Resource Management Act 1991, and is a Tūhono organisation. The charitable trust is managed by ten trustees, with representation from both the Chatham Islands, and the North Island and South Island. It is based at Owenga on Chatham Island.

== In popular culture ==
Based on the writing of Percy Smith and Elsdon Best from the late 19th century, theories grew up that the Māori had displaced a more primitive pre-Māori population of Moriori (sometimes described as a small-statured, dark-skinned race of possible Melanesian origin) in mainland New Zealand – and that the Chatham Island Moriori were the last remnant of this earlier race. These theories also favoured the supposedly more recent and more technically able Māori. This was used to justify racist stereotyping, colonisation, and conquest by cultural "superiors". From the view of European settlers this served the purpose of undermining the notion of the Māori as the indigenous people of New Zealand, making them just one in a progression of waves of migration and conquest by increasingly more civilised people.

The hypothesis of a racially distinct pre-Māori Moriori people was criticised in the 20th century by a number of historians, anthropologists and ethnologists; among them anthropologist H. D. Skinner in 1923, ethnologist Roger Duff in the 1940s, historian and ethnographer Arthur Thomson in 1959, as well as Michael King in Moriori: A People Rediscovered in 2000, James Belich in 2002, and K. R. Howe in Te Ara: The Encyclopedia of New Zealand.

The idea of Moriori arriving earlier and being vastly distinct from Māori was widely published in the early 20th century. Crucially, this story was also promoted in a series of three articles in the New Zealand School Journal of 1916, and the 1934 A. W. Reed schoolbook The Coming of the Maori to Ao-tea-roa—and therefore became familiar to generations of schoolchildren. This in turn has been repeated by the media and politicians. However, at no point has this idea completely dominated the discussion, with the academic consensus slowly gaining more public awareness over the 20th century.

The 2004 David Mitchell novel Cloud Atlas and its 2012 film adaption both featured the enslavement of Moriori by the Māori on the Chatham Islands in the mid-19th century. The film adaption stars David Gyasi as "Autua", a Moriori slave, in spite of the fact Gyasi is British of Ghanaian descent and bears no physical resemblance to Moriori people. Scholar Gabriel S. Estrada criticised the depiction of Māori slave culture as being incorrectly depicted in a similar manner to slavery in the United States, featuring enslaved Moriori working on plantations similar to those in the American South. The interchangeability of these two practices has been noted by historians as being a common misconception in popular culture.

== Notable Moriori people ==
- Joey Matenga Ashton
- Christine Harvey
- Kiti Karaka Rīwai
- Hirawanu Tapu
- Brendon Tuuta
- Torotoro

== Sources ==
- Anderson, Atholl (2014). "Te ao tawhito: The old world". In Anderson, Atholl; Binney, Judith; Harris, Aroha (eds.). Tangata Whenua: An Illustrated History. Bridget Williams Books. ISBN 978-1-927131-41-1.
- Belgrave, Michael (2005). Historical Frictions: Maori Claims and Reinvented Histories. Auckland University Press. pp. 284–316. ISBN 9781869405953. Archived from the original on 23 May 2022.
- King, Michael (2000) [First ed. 1989]. Moriori: A People Rediscovered (Rev. ed.). Penguin. ISBN 0140103910.
- Richards, Rhys (2019) [2018]. Moriori: Origins, Lifestyles and Language. Paremata Press. ISBN 9780473478568. (The 2019 publication includes amendments.)
