= Ngāti Mutunga =

Māori iwi (tribe) in New Zealand

- Iwi (tribe) in Māoridom
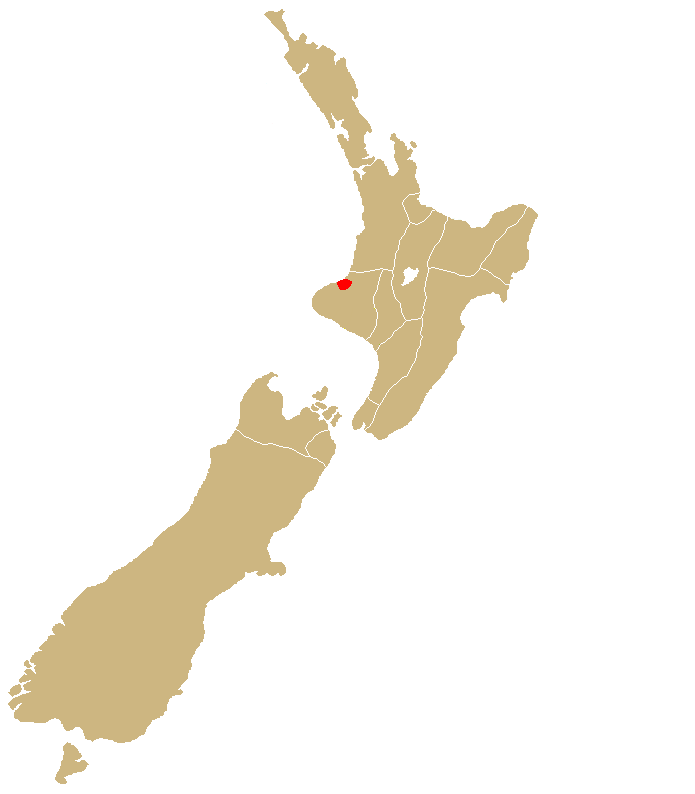
- Rohe (region): North Taranaki, Chatham Islands (the latter not shown on map)
- Waka (canoe): Tokomaru
- Website: www.ngatimutunga.iwi.nz

Ngāti Mutunga is a Māori iwi (tribe) of New Zealand, whose original tribal lands were in north Taranaki. They migrated, first to Wellington (with Ngāti Toa and other Taranaki hapū), and then to the Chatham Islands (along with Ngāti Tama) in the 1830s. The rohe of the iwi include the Chatham Islands and part of north Taranaki. The principal marae are at Urenui in Taranaki, and on the Chatham Islands.

The eponymous ancestor Mutunga, from whom Ngāti Mutunga claims its lineage, is a grandfather of Toa-rangatira, the eponymous ancestor of the Ngāti Toa tribe.

“Mai Titoki ki Te Rau o Te Huia” saying, mentions their northern boundary with Ngāti Tama (Titoki), and southern boundary with Te Āti Awa (Te Rau o Te Huia).

== History ==
=== Leaving Taranaki for Wellington ===
Ngāti Mutunga's original territory, in north Taranaki, was invaded by Waikato tribes during the Musket Wars after a series of longstanding intertribal wars stretching back to at least 1807. Ngāti Mutunga in turn joined with Ngāti Toa and the smaller Ngāti Tama tribe to invade the Wellington region. There they fought and defeated the Ngāti Ira iwi, took over their land and extinguished their independent existence. The north Taranaki land came under the mana of the great Waikato chief Te Wherowhero until sold to the government.

=== Settlement of the Chatham Islands and Moriori Genocide ===
Ngāti Mutunga lived an uneasy existence in the Wellington region, where they were threatened by tensions between Ngāti Toa and Ngāti Raukawa. In Te Whanganui a Tara (Wellington) they felt less than secure. They burnt the bones of their ancestors and gifted their land to Te Atiawa and Ngāti Tama. In November 1835 about 900 Ngāti Mutunga and Ngāti Tama people migrated to the Chatham Islands in two sailings on the ship Lord Rodney. They had originally planned to settle either Samoa or the Norfolk Islands but in a meeting at Wellington in 1835 decided to settle the Chatham Islands due to their proximity. The incoming Māori were initially cared for by local Moriori. When it became clear that the visitors intended to stay, the Moriori gathered at their marae at Te Awapatiki to debate what to do about the Māori invaders. The Moriori decided on a policy of non-aggression. Moriori had forgone the killing of people in the centuries leading up to the arrival of the Māori, instead settling quarrels up to 'first blood', a cultural practice known as 'Nunuku's Law'. The development of this pragmatic dispute settlement process left Moriori wholly unprepared to deal with the Ngāti Tama and Ngāti Mutunga settlers who came from a significantly different and more aggressive culture.

Ngāti Mutunga and Ngāti Tama saw the meeting as a possible precursor to warfare on the part of Moriori. They attacked and massacred over 260 Moriori. A Moriori survivor recalled: "[The Māori] commenced to kill us like sheep... [We] were terrified, fled to the bush, concealed ourselves in holes underground, and in any place to escape our enemies. It was of no avail; we were discovered and killed – men, women and children – indiscriminately." A Māori chief, Te Rakatau Katihe, said: "We took possession ... in accordance with our custom, and we caught all the people. Not one escaped. Some ran away from us, these we killed; and others also we killed – but what of that? It was in accordance with our custom." Despite the Chatham Islands being made part of New Zealand in 1842, Māori kept Moriori slaves until 1863.

Before Ngāti Mutunga and Ngāti Tama took their two sailings to the Chatham Islands they agreed that the land would not be divided until all had arrived, so that the first arrivals did not get an unfair advantage. However, the first shipload of arrivals, who were mainly Ngāti Tama, did not wait, and proceeded to claim the best areas, which were at Waitangi and Kaingaroa. When the second shipload arrived at Whangaroa, mostly Ngāti Mutunga and their chiefs Patukawenga and Pōmare, they were unhappy with had happened, but settled at Whangaroa. In 1839–40 Ngāti Mutunga besieged Ngāti Tama in their pā at Waitangi and after several months drove them out of Waitangi to other parts of Chatham Island.

=== Gold prospectors allowed on rohe ===
In the mid-1870s Ngāti Mutunga in Taranaki allowed gold prospectors to search the Mokau River valley for signs of gold. The Mokau River formed the boundary between this iwi and the Ngāti Maniapoto rohe, which was in a struggle with the Māori king (who claimed mana over Rohe Potae). Te Kooti (who had been given sanctuary by the Maniapoto fighting chief Rewi Maniapoto, against the express wishes of the Māori king), was allowed to go to the river mouth for seafood. Te Kooti tried to form an alliance with a local hapū to drive out the prospectors and their Ngāti Mutunga guardians.

=== Treaty of Waitangi claims settlement for Taranaki ===
During the conflict in Taranaki over land in the 1860s and subsequently, Ngāti Mutunga left en masse from the Chatham Islands, joined with other iwi in rebelling against the Crown's decision to purchase land from Māori. This led to at least 23 Ngāti Mutunga taking part in the Parihaka occupation of disputed land and their subsequent arrest. In 1865 Ngāti Mutunga land was confiscated under the New Zealand Settlements Act 1863. However provision was made for Ngāti Mutunga people who had not rebelled by the returning of 3,600 hectares (9,000 acres) of land, and then in 1870 a further 6,100 hectares (15,000 acres). The land was returned to individuals. The later land was mainly inland and most was sold. It is unknown how many Ngāti Mutunga existed in the rohe as many had taken part in the invasion of the Chatham Islands. Based on the present Ngāti Mutunga population of 2,000 (c. 2007) it was possibly about 200.

In 1926–1927 the Sim Commission investigated various Taranaki claims and resolved that wrong had been done and awarded £5000 per annum to be paid. It is claimed that this was paid irregularly during the 1930s economic depression. In 2005–2006 a Deed of Settlement to settle outstanding Treaty of Waitangi issues was signed by Ngāti Mutunga after being endorsed by 95% of those Ngāti Mutunga eligible to vote. This settlement awarded $14.9 million and 10 areas of land of cultural significance to Ngāti Mutunga.

=== Treaty of Waitangi claims settlement for Chatham Islands ===
On 25 November 2022, Ngāti Mutunga o Wharekauri and the New Zealand Government/Crown signed an "agreement in principle" for settlement of historical Treaty of Waitangi claims. The Crown acknowledged that it had failed to consult the iwi/tribe during its annexation of the Chathams Islands in 1842. The "agreement in principle" includes a financial redress of NZ$13 million, the option to transfer culturally significant lands to the iwi as "cultural redress," and shared redress between the iwi and Moriori.

== Organisations ==
Te Korimako o Taranaki is the radio station of Ngāti Mutunga and other Taranaki region iwi, including Ngāti Tama, Te Atiawa, Ngati Maru, Taranaki, Ngāruahine, Ngāti Ruanui, Ngaa Rauru Kiitahi. It started at the Bell Block campus of Taranaki Polytechnic in 1992, and moved to the Spotswood campus in 1993. It is available on 94.8 FM across Taranaki.

Ngāti Mutunga o Wharekauri Iwi Trust has a mandate recognised by the New Zealand Government to represent Ngāti Mutunga of the Chatham Islands in Treaty of Waitangi settlement negotiations. The trust is also a mandated iwi organisation under the Māori Fisheries Act 2004, an iwi aquaculture organisation under the Māori Commercial Aquaculture Claims Settlement Act 2004, a Tūhono organisation, and represents the Chatham Islands branch of the iwi as an iwi authority under the Resource Management Act. It is a common law trust, and is governed by one representative from the North Island, one representative from the South Island and five representatives from the Chatham Islands. As of 2023, the trust chair is Deena Whaitiri.

== Notable people ==
- George Bertrand, soldier
- Christine Harvey, tā moko artist
- Te Rangi Hīroa, doctor, military leader, health administrator, politician, anthropologist and museum director
- Rachel House, actress
- Miriama Kamo, journalist and TV presenter
- Christine Kenney, professor of disaster risk reduction
- Māui Pōmare, doctor and politician
- Howie Tamati, rugby league player and coach and politician
- Kevin Tamati, rugby league player and coach
- Kahe Te Rau-o-te-rangi, leader, trader and innkeeper
- Brendon Tuuta, rugby league player

== See also ==
- List of Māori iwi
