= Okawa =

Okawa or Ōkawa may refer to:

== People ==
- Ōkawa (surname)

== Places ==
Japan

- Ōkawa, Fukuoka
- Ōkawa, Kochi

New Zealand

- Okawa Point, Chatham Islands

== See also ==
- Ogawa (disambiguation)
