= Lake Huro =

Lake on Chatham Island, New Zealand

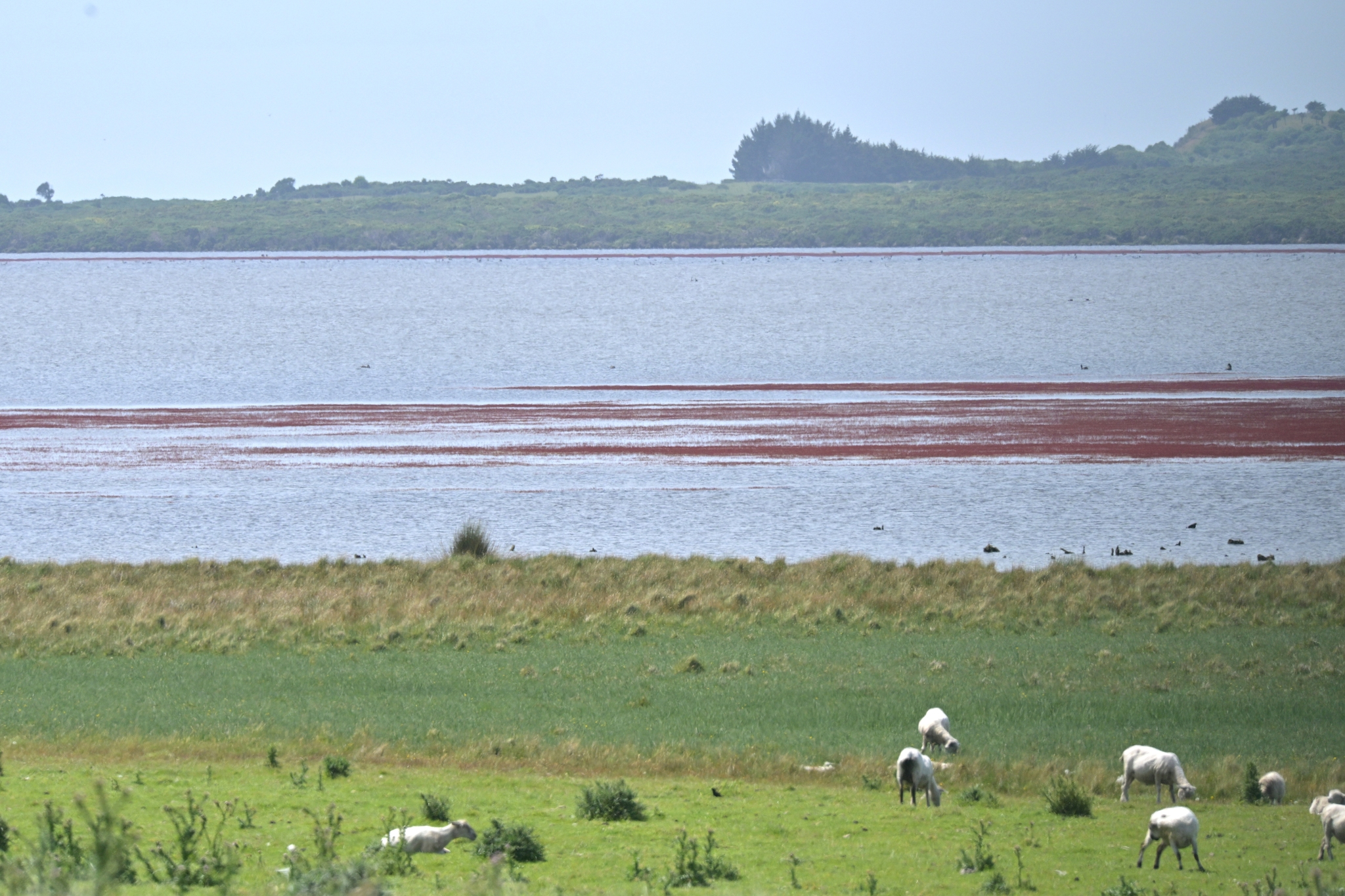
- View of Lake Huro, showing a Myriophyllum growth
- Interactive map of Lake Huro
- Location: Chatham Island, New Zealand
- Coordinates: 43°56′S 176°31′W
- Primary outflows: Mangapē Creek
- Surface area: 598 ha (1,480 acres)
- Max. depth: 0.3 m (0.98 ft)

Lake Huro is a coastal dune lake on Chatham Island, New Zealand, southwest of Te Whanga Lagoon and close to the settlement of Waitangi. Hosting many waterfowl and a population of New Zealand smelt, the shallow lake contains green and cloudy water, posing a potential toxic hazard due to its outflow through Mangapē Creek to the Nairn River and Waitangi.

== Description ==
Lake Huro is a coastal dune lake on Chatham Island, New Zealand, located on a strip of land between the Te Whanga Lagoon and the largest settlement on Chatham, Waitangi. It covers an area of around 598 hectares (1,480 acres), but with a maximum depth of only 0.3 m (1 ft). Like nearby Lake Rangitai, Lake Huro was once an extension of the Te Whanga Lagoon.

The lake's sediment mostly consists of sand, with a crust of peat along its shores. The water is green and turbid, stained by the peat. The water visibility was measured in 2004 as just 0.1 metres (0.33 ft), although the growth of Myriophyllum (water milfoil) plants in the lake may have led to some increases. Mangapē Creek drains the lake, running through an area of farmland into the Nairn River (also known as Mangatukurewa Creek) south of Waitangi. The surrounding land is mainly used for livestock grazing, with animals such as sheep given direct access to the lake. A small number of residences are located within the lake's drainage basin. It has similar water characteristics to other coastal dune lakes on Chatham, especially the nearby Tennants Lake and Lake Rangitai.

The lake's water degraded during the early 2020s to hypertrophic, the lowest possible water quality level according to the New Zealand trophic level index. It has moderate levels of phosphorus and ammoniacal nitrogen, but severely high amounts of nitrogen and algae. Pollution from nearby residences and farms have likely contributed to the increase in nitrogen. In a 2022 survey, Huro was the only one of the island's lakes where chlorophyll a levels were not found to have increased. The shallow waters of Huro allow for wind to agitate nutrients in the lake's sediment, making them available for algae to consume. Shallow waters also decrease the volume of water in which nutrients can become diluted.

Lake Huro's poor water quality poses a risk to nearby settlements, as Mangapē Creek and Mangatukurewa Creek drain into a well-populated waterfront area in Waitangi. Potential blooms of toxic cyanobacteria could endanger nearby livestock, wildlife, shellfish, and local residents. The lake's shoreline is eroding.

=== Flora and fauna ===
Lake Huro hosts a significant population of waterfowl, such as the introduced black swans. It hosts a large population of the New Zealand smelt, alongside small numbers of redfin bullies (a species of goby). In 1949, smelt from the lake (alongside samples from nearby Tennants Lake and Lake Marakapia) were described as a separate species from New Zealand smelt, R. chathamensis; this was later synonymised with Retropinna retropinna, New Zealand smelt. Lake Huro seems to have a genetically distinct population of smelt compared to Lake Marakapia and Tennants Lake. A species of the algae Lamprothamnium grows in the lake.
