= Ngāti Mutunga–Ngāti Tama conflict =

Intertribal Māori war

Date	1839 or 1840 to 1842
Location	Chatham Islands
Result	Ngāti Mutunga victory; Ngāti Mutunga gained control of the contested area, acquiring more territory.

Belligerents
Ngāti Mutunga	Ngāti Tama; Kekerewai	Neutral Kekerewai

Commanders and leaders
Wiremu Piti Pōmare; Tatua	Wiremu Kingi Meremere; Raumoa; Te Rakatau	Te Rakatau

The Ngāti Mutunga–Ngāti Tama conflict took place in the Chatham Islands from 1839 or 1840 to 1842. The Ngāti Mutunga and Ngāti Tama Māori tribes (iwi) had migrated to the Chatham Islands together in 1835. The first arrivals, who were mainly Ngāti Tama, broke an agreement with Ngāti Mutunga and took control of the best areas of Chatham Island, which were at Waitangi and Kaingaroa, before most of the Ngāti Mutunga arrived. Furthermore, they blocked Ngāti Mutunga access to trade with visiting whalers at Waitangi. Ngāti Mutunga decided to attack Ngāti Tama, to try to drive them out of Waitangi. They besieged Ngāti Tama and after several months succeeded in forcing them to abandon Waitangi. After a few more skirmishes, and the adoption of Christianity by most of the two tribes, the conflict ended. The two sides seemed to show restraint in combat, due to having relatives on the opposing side, and only a few people died in the entire conflict.

== Background ==
Ngāti Mutunga and Ngāti Tama were two tribes from Taranaki. They occupied adjacent territories in north Taranaki and were closely related through intermarriage and shared ancestry. The arrival of Europeans in New Zealand and Māori acquisition of muskets changed power balances between tribes and started a series of conflicts known as the "Musket Wars". The two tribes, along with other tribes from the west coast of the North Island, such as Ngāti Toa, became embroiled in conflicts with the powerful tribes of the lower Waikato valley. Seeing no end to the threat from the Waikato, the tribes migrated to the southern North Island, with Ngāti Mutunga and Ngāti Tama settling around Wellington Harbour. Within years, history repeated, as conflict and tensions arose between the various relocated tribes. Feeling threatened by Ngāti Toa and Ngāti Raukawa after the battle of Haowhenua near Te Horo in 1834, Ngāti Mutunga and Ngāti Tama migrated together again, this time to the Chatham Islands. In 1835 they commandeered a ship, which had to make two trips to convey all of them and their possessions. The indigenous people of the Chathams were the Moriori, of shared Polynesian ancestry with Māori, who had a philosophy of pacifism. They chose not to resist the invaders militarily, and the Māori committed a massacre of them, took over their lands, and enslaved the rest of them.

== Prelude ==
Before Ngāti Mutunga and Ngāti Tama took their two sailings to the Chatham Islands they agreed that the land would not be divided until all had arrived, so that the first arrivals did not get an unfair advantage. However, the first shipload of arrivals, who were mainly Ngāti Tama, did not wait, and proceeded to claim the best areas, which were at Waitangi and Kaingaroa. When the second shipload arrived at Whangaroa, mostly Ngāti Mutunga and their chiefs Patukawenga and Pōmare, they were unhappy with had happened, but settled at Whangaroa. The unhappiness endured, as whaling ships more often called at Waitangi, where large areas of good soil for growing potatoes to barter were handy to the anchorage. Ngāti Mutunga had to carry their potatoes further from their cultivations to the shore and even then Ngāti Tama would not let them bring canoes of produce to Waitangi to trade with whalers. Ngāti Mutunga also could not reach some significant seafood locations. Pōmare, who had become the senior chief when Patukawenga died, wrote letters of complaint to Ngāti Tama, who tore them up.

In May 1838 the French whaling ship Jean Bart anchored in Waitangi Bay. Māori from both tribes went aboard the ship to barter, but started arguing with each other. Ngāti Mutunga people wanted the ship to move to Whangaroa, but Ngāti Tama wanted it to remain at Waitangi. Accounts of what happened next are confused. It seems that the captain misinterpreted the antagonism of the two Māori groups as being aimed at the French rather than at each other. He panicked and had his crew attack the Māori, killing a number, and raised anchor and set sail. Māori got hold of the ship's guns and started shooting at the crew, killing two. The crew took to the boats, abandoning the ship and disappearing out to sea. The Māori sailed the ship back to land but it was wrecked on rocks, then was looted and burned by Ngāti Mutunga.

The Ngāti Mutunga were falsely accused of being responsible for the fight on the ship. The French warship Heroine, which was in the Bay of Islands, heard of the incident and sailed to Chatham Island to take reprisal in October 1838. It bombarded Waitangi, then sent a party ashore to burn all the structures there and at three other villages, and captured several men, taking them to France. The killings of men aboard the Jean Bart and the capture of several others by the Heroine weakened Ngāti Tama relative to their Ngāti Mutunga rivals.

== War ==
=== Siege ===
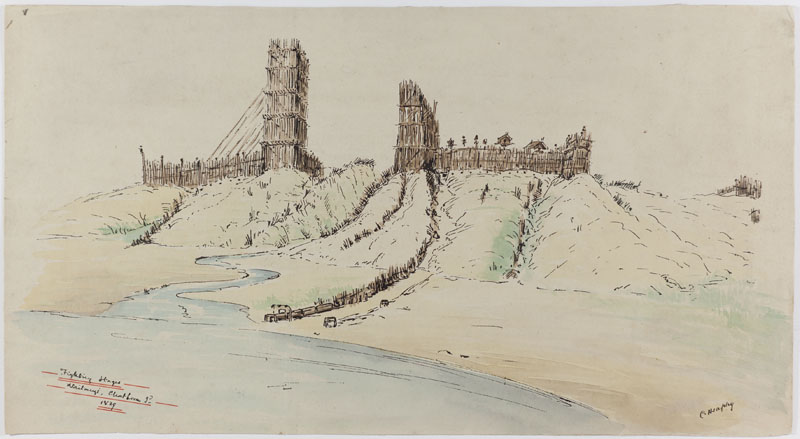
The two pā and their towers, the taller one built by Ngāti Mutunga to shoot down on the Ngāti Tama pā. Drawing by Charles Heaphy.

Pōmare saw Ngāti Tama's weakened state as an opportunity to drive them out of Waitangi. About a year after the encounters with the French, a Ngāti Mutunga war party formed and marched to Waitangi, led by Tauru Matioro. They built a pā (fort), complete with a taumaihi (fighting stage or tower), next to Ngāti Tama's Kaimātaotao pā 400–500 yards (370–460 m) from the mouth of the Nairn River. Both pā had non-traditional features due to the adoption of muskets in Māori warfare. They then shot down upon the Ngāti Tama in their pā, who fired back, killing Te Ahipaura, the eldest son of a leading kaumatua (elder) of Ngāti Mutunga. This strengthened Ngāti Mutunga's determination to drive out the Ngāti Tama.

Kekerewai were a Ngāti Mutunga hapu (clan) that was allied with the Ngāti Tama. Their leader Raumoa was related to Te Ahipaura, who he considered a "son" of his. Upset that his side had killed Te Ahipaura, and bothered that events had taken such a serious turn, he sent Te Rakatau and other Kekerewai to leave the pā and switch sides. They did leave, but rather than join the other side, stayed neutral.

The besieged Ngāti Tama eventually started to run short of food and, realising they faced a difficult situation, decided to abandon Waitangi. While they were planning this, in May 1840, the New Zealand Company survey ship Cuba arrived at Waitangi from New Zealand. The company wanted to buy the Chatham Islands. Company officials on board included land purchase officer Richard D. Hanson, artist Charles Heaphy and naturalist Ernst Dieffenbach. The officials intervened to save the Ngāti Tama, whom they thought would be annihilated, leaving them without landowners to deal with. They evacuated Ngāti Tama from their pā to the Cuba and sailed them to Kaingaroa and Waikeri at the north-eastern part of the island. A man named Toko was the only Ngāti Tama killed in the battle.

=== Ambush ===
A war party of Ngāti Mutunga went after the Ngāti Tama and ambushed Pehitaka, who was out shooting birds. He was the younger brother of Ngāti Tama leader Wiremu Kingi Meremere. Tangari Te Umu of Ngāti Mutunga killed Pehitaka with a tomahawk. His death was regarded as sufficient revenge for Te Ahipaura being shot earlier.

=== Final battle ===
A party of Ngāti Mutunga led by Tatua fought a Ngāti Tama party led by Meremere, resulting in two dead and one injured on the Mutunga side. Tatua then raised his taiaha, which Meremere recognised as an indication for peace, which they accepted.

== End of conflict ==
Peace was strengthened in late 1842 when Māori Church of England missionaries came to the Chatham Islands and most of the two tribes adopted Christianity. The missionaries were Wiremu Tāmihana Te Neke, Hākaraia Te Iwikaha, and Pita Hongihongi.

Ngāti Mutunga had won the conflict. Many Ngāti Tama later went back to the mainland.

== Bibliography ==
- King, Michael (2000) [1989]. Moriori: A People Rediscovered (Rev. ed.). Penguin. ISBN 0140103910.
- Shand, Alexander (1893). "The occupation of the Chatham Islands by the Maoris in 1835. Part IV.—Intertribal dissensions". The Journal of the Polynesian Society. 2 (2): 74–86. JSTOR 27071278.
