= Lake Marakapia =

Lake on Chatham Island, New Zealand

- Interactive map of Lake Marakapia
- Location: Chatham Island, New Zealand
- Coordinates: 43°50′33″S 176°33′18″W
- Primary outflows: two unnamed streams
- Surface area: 36 ha (89 acres)
- Max. depth: 2.5 m (8.2 ft)

Lake Marakapia is a shallow dune lake on Chatham Island in New Zealand. Surrounded by sand dunes and livestock pasture, it has cloudy, eutrophic water, and hosts algae as well as fish such as New Zealand smelt and giant kōkopu.

== Description ==
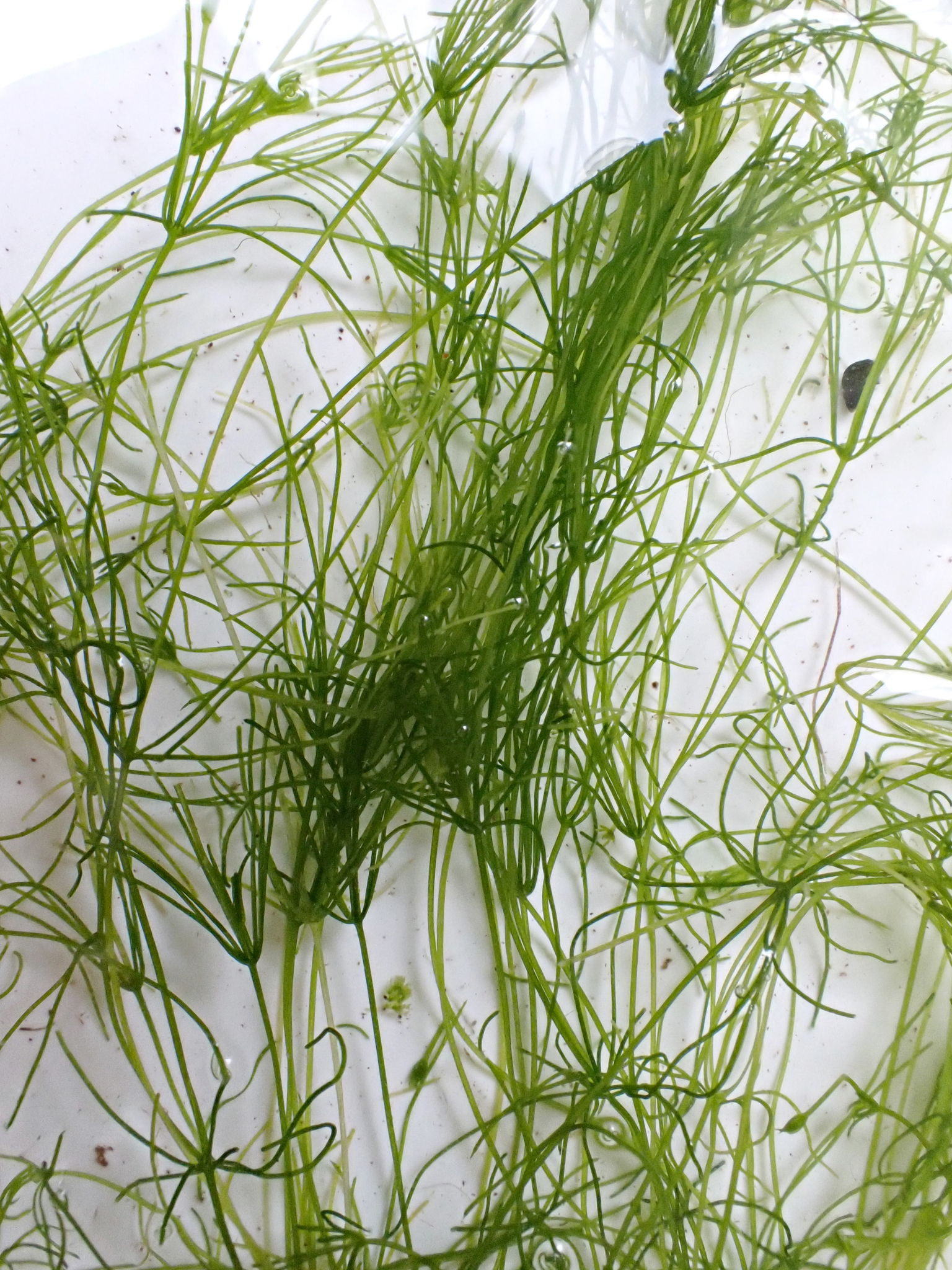
A specimen of the algae Chara globularis found in Lake Marakpia

Lake Marakapia is a shallow dune lake on Chatham Island in New Zealand, located on the isthmus which runs between Petre Bay and Te Whanga Lagoon. It has an area of 36 hectares (89 acres), and a maximum depth of 2.5 m (8.2 ft), among the deeper lakes on the island. It is surrounded by a sandy drainage basin covered in dunes, unlike the peat-dominated basins of most other lakes on the island. The water is quite turbid, green and eutrophic. A monitoring site at the southwest shore shows notably high levels of nitrogen in the lake. Levels of phosphorus and algae in the lake are moderate but very likely increasing.

The sediment of Lake Marakapia is mainly sand, with organic matter and mud near the shore. The land surrounding the lake is used as pasture for local livestock, who are able to directly access the lake. Two outflow streams drain the lake.

=== Flora and fauna ===
The water plant Ranunculus acaulis (dune buttercup) grows as a submergent plant near the shores of the lake. Fish such as New Zealand smelt and the giant kōkopu (a vulnerable species) live in the lake. In 1949, smelt from the lake (alongside samples from nearby Lake Huro and Tennants Lake) were described as a separate species from New Zealand smelt, R. chathamensis; this was later synonymised with Retropinna retropinna, New Zealand smelt. Smelt from Lake Marakpia show genetic ties to those found in Tennants Lake, although Lake Huro seems to have a genetically distinct population. The smelt in Marakapia were noted to host the viruses Retropinna adomavirus-3 and Retropinna astrovirus-1.

In the 1930s and 1940s, Major G. F. Hutton, a property owner in the Chathams, attempted to establish a local trout population. In 1947, he had a flying boat deposit 5,000 juvenile brown trout into Lake Marakapia. As the lake (like most on Chatham Island) lacks suitable spawning habitat, the introduced trout population soon went extinct.
