= Lake Rangitai =

Lake on Chatham Island, New Zealand

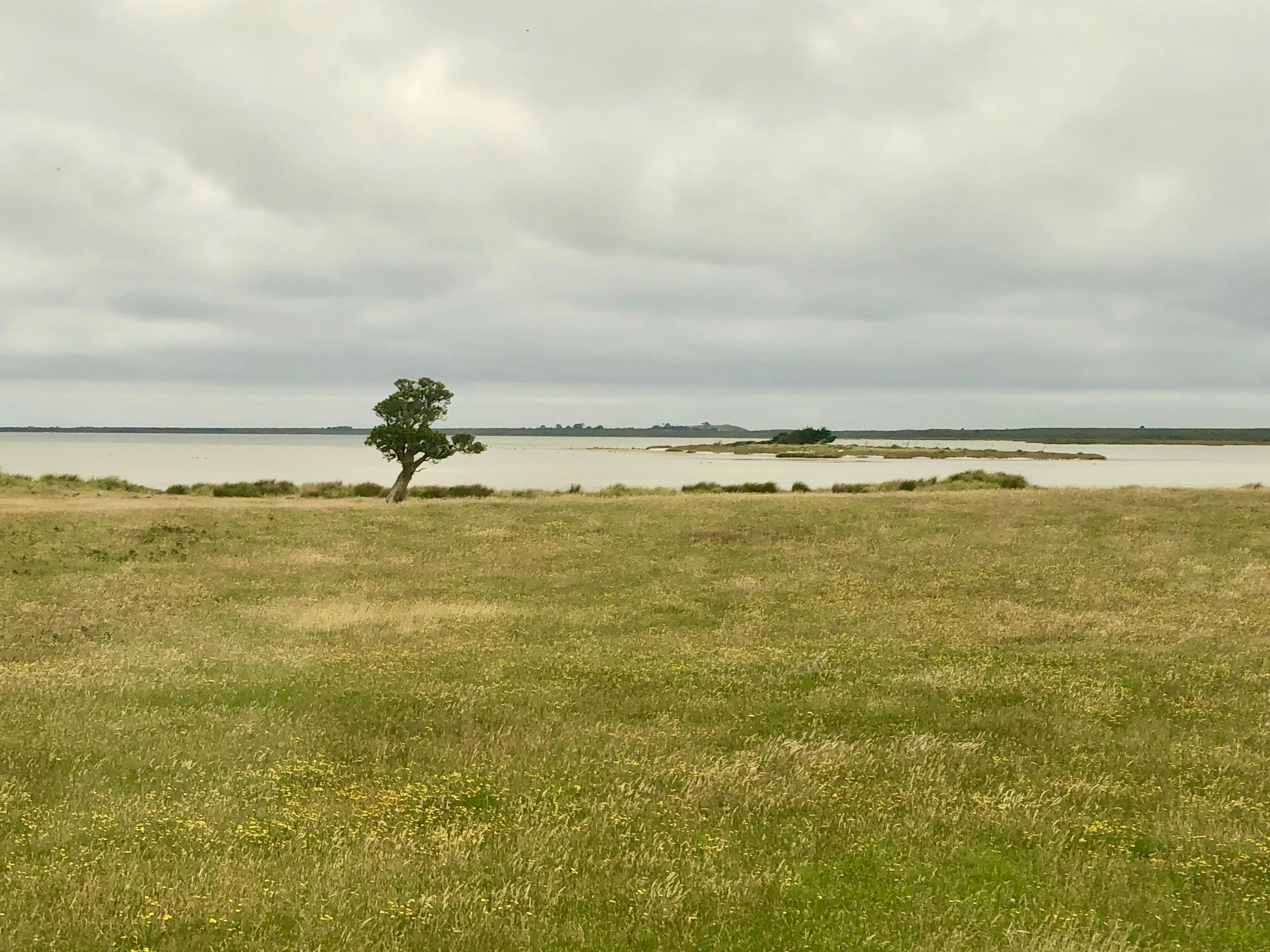
- Lake Rangitai

- Location within Chatham Islands
- Location: Chatham Island, Chatham Islands
- Coordinates: 43°46′S 176°21′W
- Basin countries: New Zealand
- Surface area: 867 ha (2,140 acres)
- Max. depth: 1.3 m (4 ft 3 in)

Lake Rangitai (sometimes spelt Rangitahi) is located in the Chatham Islands of New Zealand. It is located on Chatham Island, to the northeast of Te Whanga Lagoon, close to the northern end of Hanson Bay.

Lake Rangitai is a dune-dammed lake, which is clearer than nearby lakes, with underwater visibility over 10 m (33 ft). It provides the water supply for Kaingaroa, about 6 km (3.7 mi) away. In the deeper parts of the lake the vegetation is dominated by the Charophytes Lamprothamnium and Nitella hyalina.
