= Tennants Lake =

Lake in Chatham Island, New Zealand

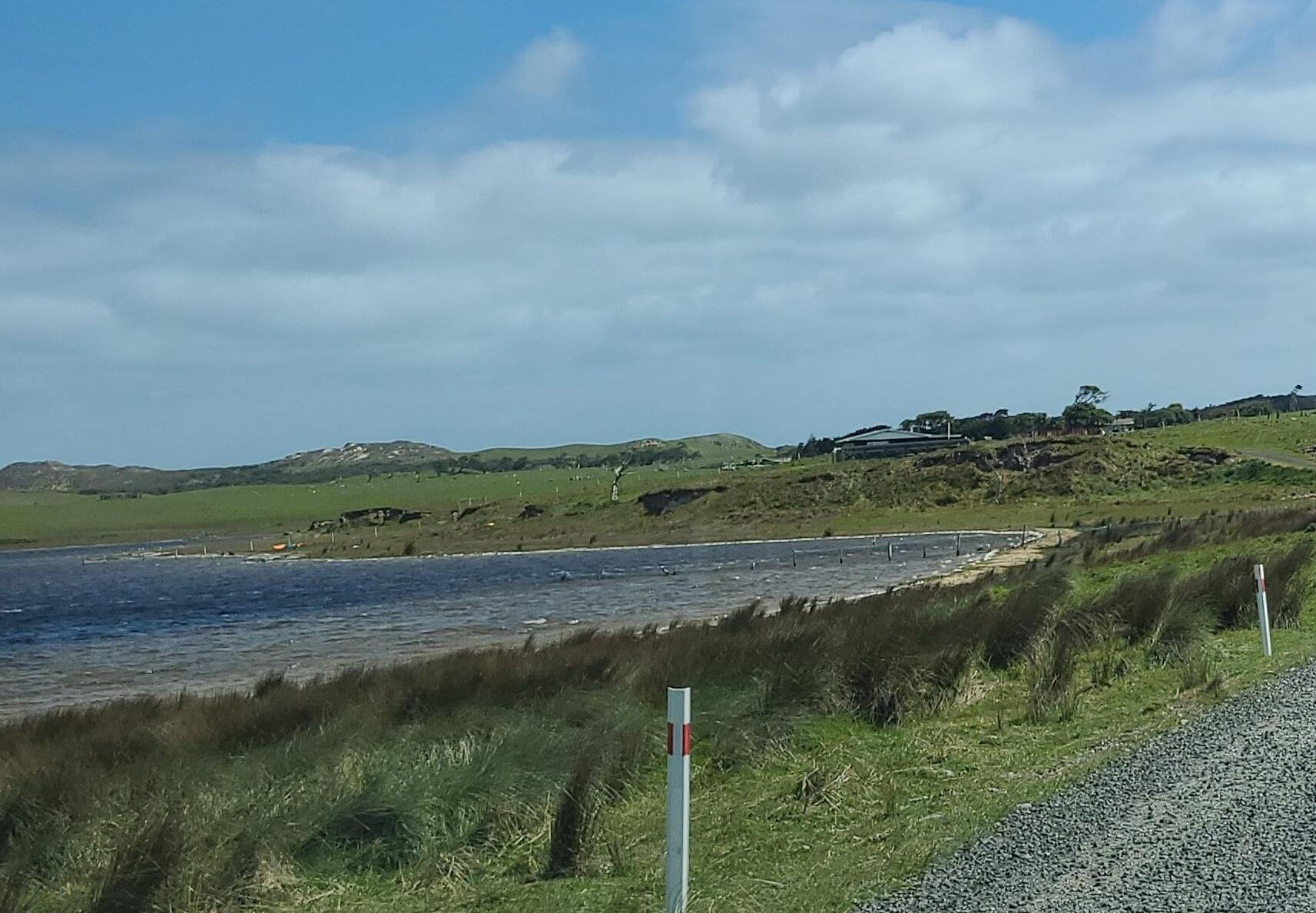
- Tennants Lake from nearby road
- Interactive map of Tennants Lake
- Location: Chatham Island, New Zealand
- Coordinates: 43.8291°S 176.5694°W
- Primary outflows: two streams
- Surface area: 45–50 ha (110–120 acres)
- Max. depth: 4–6 m (13–20 ft)
- Surface elevation: 21 m (69 ft)

Tennants Lake is a sandy dune lake on Chatham Island, in the Chatham Islands of New Zealand. One of the deeper and clearer lakes on the island, it has a sandy drainage basin, unlikely much of the peat-dominated terrain on the island. It hosts various aquatic plants and a population of New Zealand smelt.

== Description ==
Tennants Lake is a sandy dune lake on Chatham Island, the main island of the Chatham Islands of New Zealand. It is situated at an altitude of 21 metres (69 ft) and has an area of about 45 to 50 hectares (110 to 120 acres). One of the deepest lakes on the island, it reaches a maximum depth of 4 to 6 metres (13 to 20 ft). Alongside nearby Lake Marakapia, it forms part of a small chain of dune lakes inland from the shore of Petre Bay. These sandy drainage basins are unusual on Chatham, where the ground is dominated by peat. The surrounding land is mainly pastoral farmland, with livestock given access to the lake. Two outflow streams drain it. A small unnamed peaty lake lies opposite to Tennants, separated by a nearby road.

The lake has a greater visibility than most other lakes on Chatham, rated at 5 m (16 ft) in a 2004 study. The water colour is clear to yellowish. A mesotrophic lake (intermediate levels of algae and nutrients), it has typical amounts of algae and slightly elevated amounts of nitrogen and phosphorus. Its levels of ammoniacal nitrogen appear to be improving, although its phosphorus and algae levels are likely degrading. After briefly becoming eutrophic in 2020 and 2021, it is one of only a few Chatham lakes to remain in this condition, preventing a murky condition.

=== Flora and fauna ===
Tennants Lake hosts the aquatic plants Myriophyllum triphyllum and Ruppia polycarpa. A 2004 survey found many of these plants left without leaves, likely due to caterpillar activity. New Zealand smelt are commonly found in the lake. In 1949, smelt from the lake (alongside samples from nearby Lake Huro and Lake Marakapia) were described as a separate species from New Zealand smelt, R. chathamensis; this was later synonymised with Retropinna retropinna, New Zealand smelt. Smelt from Lake Marakpia show genetic ties to those found in Tennants Lake, although Lake Huro seems to have a genetically distinct population.
