= Lake Te Wapu =

Lake in Chatham Island, New Zealand

- Location within Chatham Islands
- Location: Chatham Island, New Zealand
- Coordinates: 43°44′29″S 176°15′43″W
- Type: Lake
- Primary inflows: Unnamed stream
- Basin countries: New Zealand
- Surface area: 28 hectares (69 acres)
- Max. depth: 1.2 metres (3.9 ft)

Lake Te Wapu (Māori pronunciation: [tɛ ˈwapʉ]) is a shallow coastal dune lake in northeastern Chatham Island, New Zealand, adjacent to the Pacific coast and the village of Kaingaroa. The lake's proximity to the ocean allows significant amounts of seawater to intermittently flow into the lake, leading to brackish conditions. Large populations of inanga reside in the lake, alongside eels and New Zealand smelt. Several species of emergent plants grow along its shores.

== Description ==
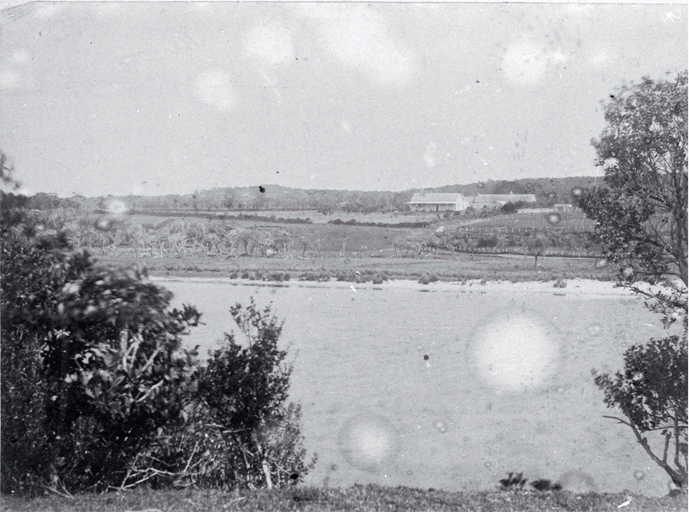
Lake Te Wapu and Ritchie's homestead, c. 1867

Lake Te Wapu is a coastal dune lake in northeastern Chatham Island, near the village of Kaingaroa. It has an area of 28 hectares (69 acres) and a maximum depth of 1.2 metres (3.9 ft). A single stream flows into the lake. Scrub and ranching land surrounds the lake. Thomas Ritchie, an early European settler of Chatham Island, leased a large ranching property adjacent to the lake in the mid-1860s. He built his residence, dubbed Lake House, along the shore of Te Wapu in 1867.

Due to its direct adjacency to the Pacific Ocean, a significant amount of saltwater flows into Te Wapu intermittently, leading to its estimated 10% seawater by volume. Nearby Lake Pateriki also undergoes this process, although to a much greater extent. Like most other lakes on Chatham, Te Wapu is weakly alkaline. It has sandy sediment and a peat-stained water colour. The lake exhibits high levels of eutrophication (nutrient enrichment); a 2007 study classified the lake as one of four supertrophic lakes on Chatham. This nutrient enrichment has led to harmful algal blooms and a variable but generally poor water quality. Unlike most lakes on the island, it has a relative abundance of nitrogen relative to phosphorus, attributed to leachate from a nearby rubbish dump.

=== Flora and fauna ===
Black swans and black shags have been observed at Te Wapu. Emergent plants grow around the edges of the lake, such as Apodasmia similis, Eleocharis acuta, Schoenoplectus pungens, and Baumea arthrophylla. However, areas of the lake not fenced-off to cattle lack tall emergent plants due to grazing. A large population of inanga inhabit the lake, alongside longfin eel, short-finned eel, and New Zealand smelt.
