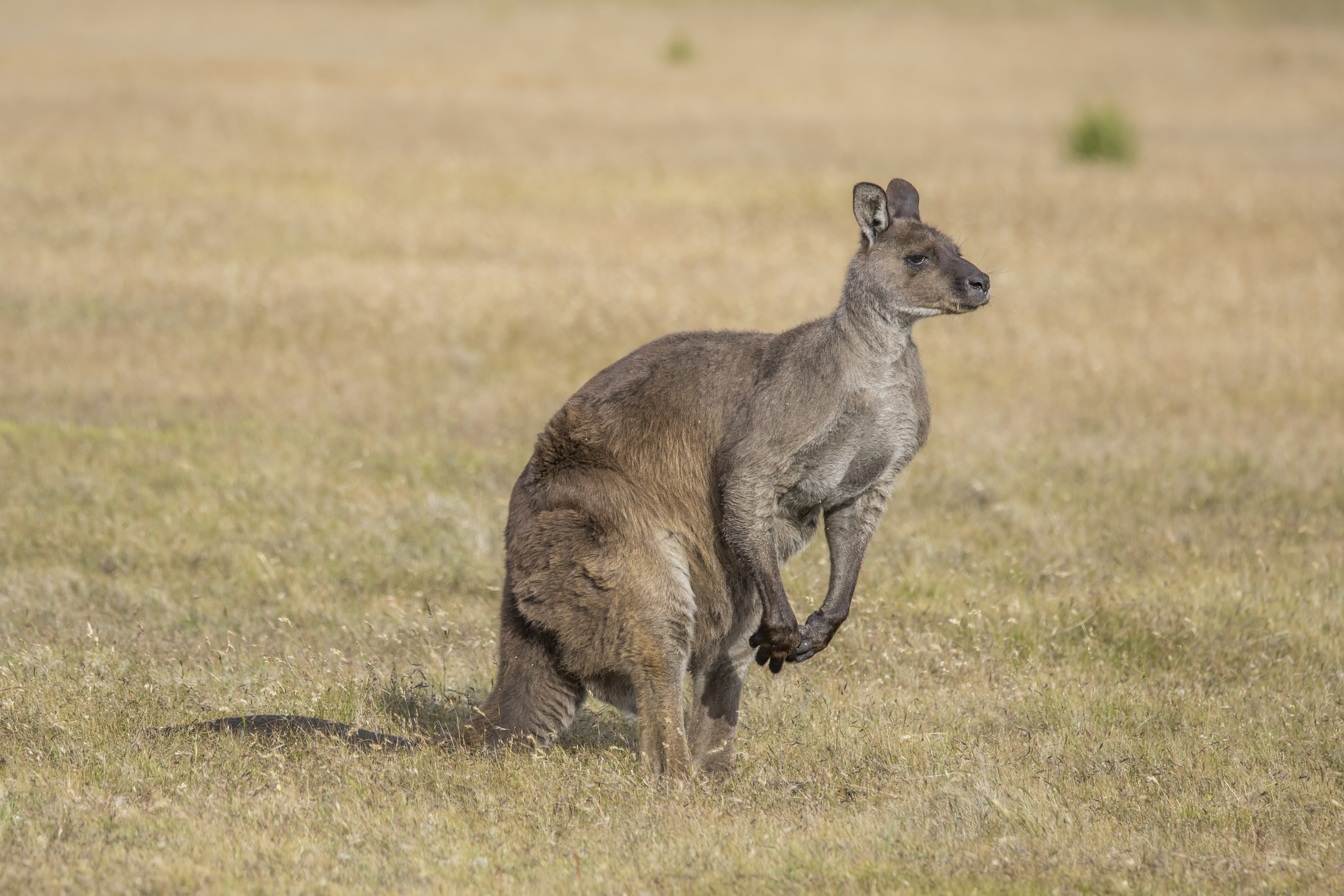
- Male
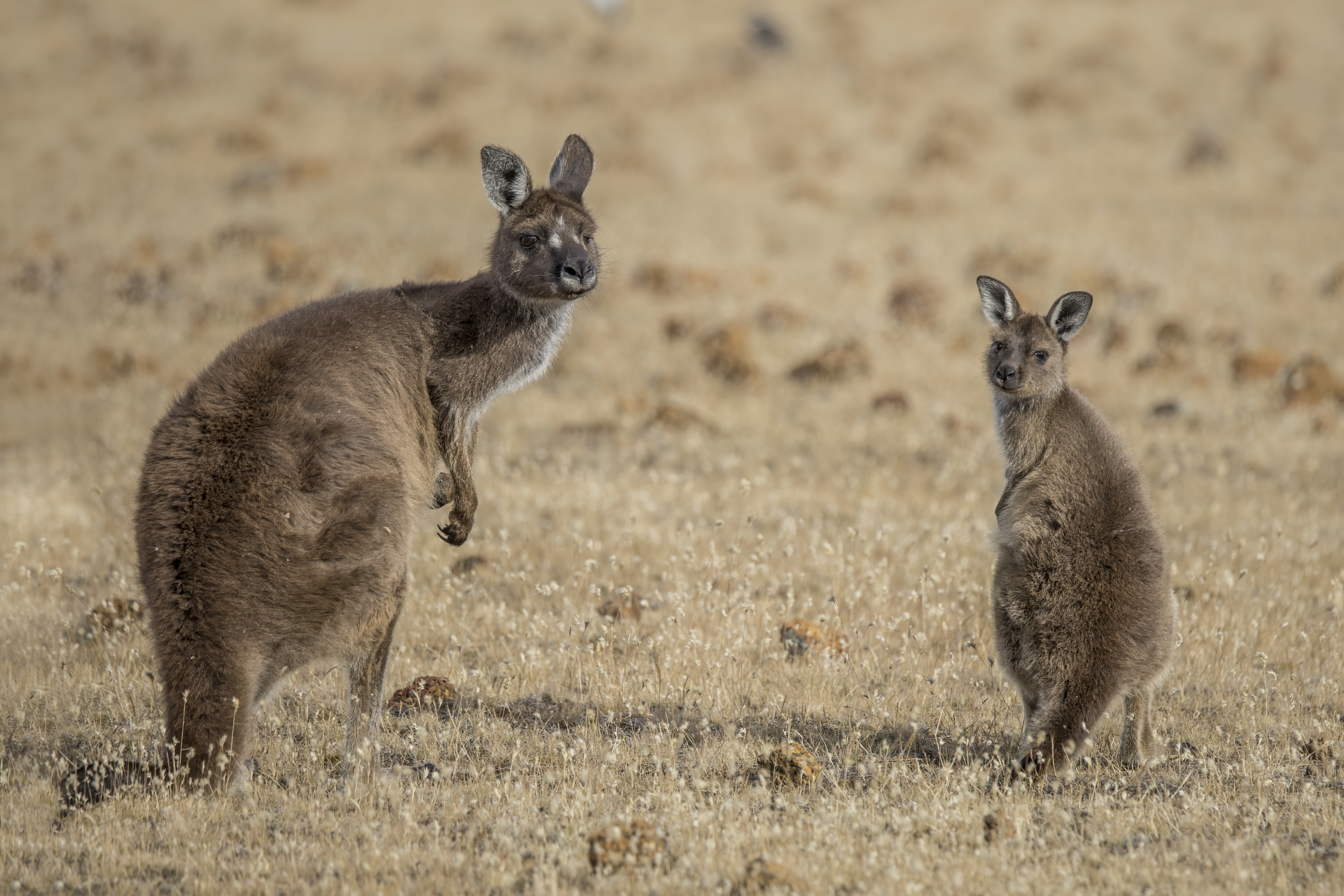
- Female with joey Both at the Hanson Bay on Kangaroo Island, SA

Conservation status
- Least Concern (IUCN 3.1)

- Delisted (ESA)

Scientific classification
- Kingdom: Animalia
- Phylum: Chordata
- Class: Mammalia
- Infraclass: Marsupialia
- Order: Diprotodontia
- Family: Macropodidae
- Genus: Macropus
- Species: M. fuliginosus

Binomial name
- Macropus fuliginosus Desmarest, 1817
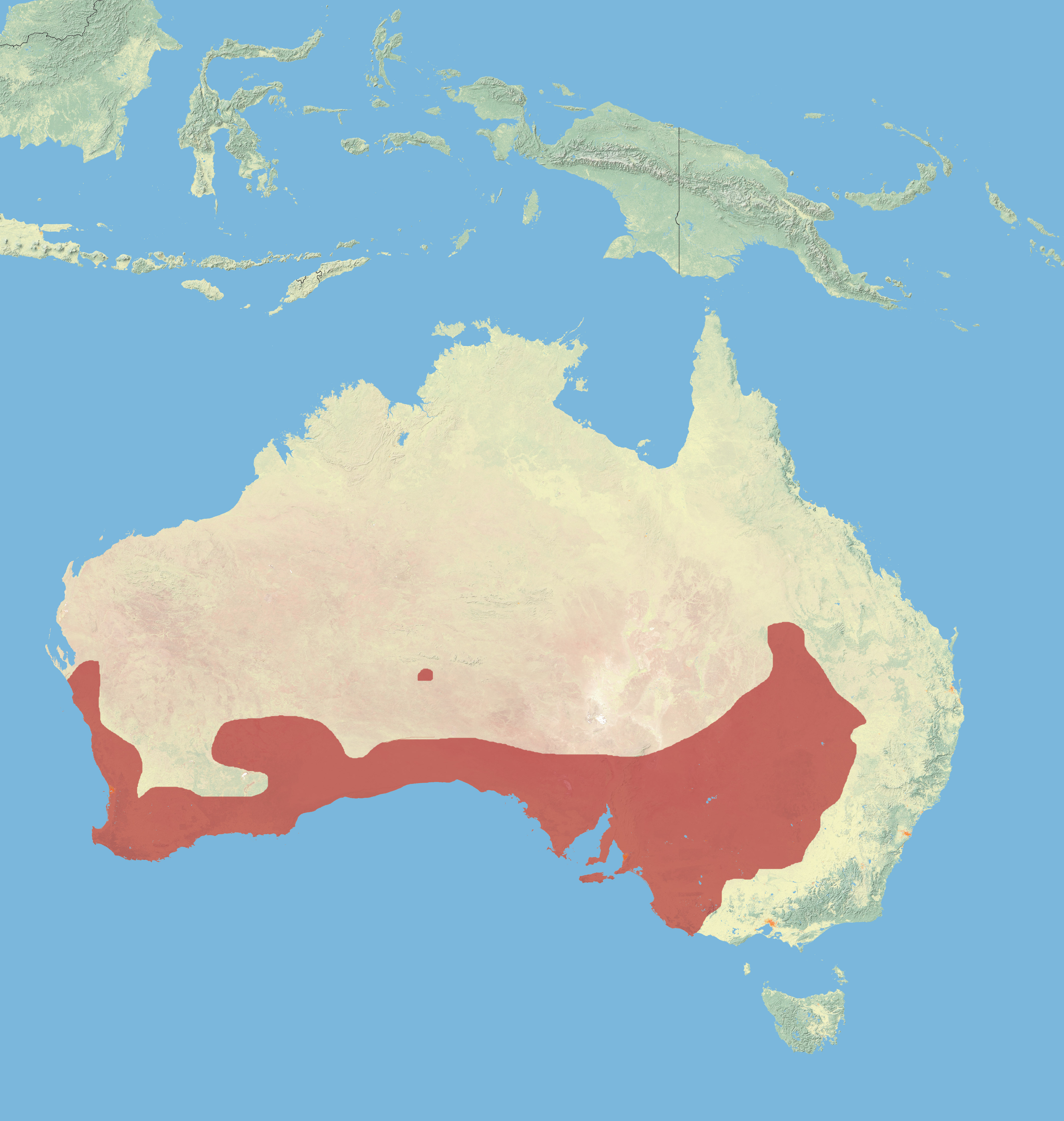
- Western grey kangaroo range

= Western grey kangaroo =

Species of marsupial

The western grey kangaroo (Macropus fuliginosus), also referred to as a western grey giant kangaroo, black-faced kangaroo, mallee kangaroo, sooty kangaroo and (when referring to the Kangaroo Island subspecies) Kangaroo Island grey kangaroo, is a large and very common kangaroo found across almost the entire southern part of Australia, from just south of Shark Bay through coastal Western Australia and South Australia, into western Victoria, and in the entire Murray–Darling basin in New South Wales and Queensland.

== Taxonomy ==
Long known to the Aboriginal Australians, for Europeans, the western grey kangaroo was the centre of a great deal of sometimes comical taxonomic confusion for almost 200 years. It was first noted by European explorers when Matthew Flinders landed on Kangaroo Island in 1802. Flinders shot several for food, but assumed that they were eastern grey kangaroos. In 1803, French explorers captured several Kangaroo Island western grey kangaroos and shipped them to Paris, where they lived in the Ménagerie du Jardin des Plantes for some years. Eventually, researchers at the Paris Museum of Natural History recognized that these animals were indeed distinct from the eastern grey kangaroo and formally described the species as Macropus fuliginosus in 1817. For reasons that remain unclear, the species was, later in 1888, incorrectly described as native to Tasmania. It was not until 1924 that researchers realized that the "forester kangaroo" of Tasmania was in fact Macropus giganteus, the same eastern grey kangaroo that was, and still is, widespread in the southeastern part of the mainland, and reaffirmed Kangaroo Island as the source of the type specimens. By 1971, it was understood that the Kangaroo Island western grey kangaroo belonged to the same species as the kangaroos of southern and Western Australia, and that this population extended through much of the eastern part of the continent as well (see range map). For a time, three subspecies were described, two on the mainland and one on Kangaroo Island. The current classification scheme emerged in the 1990s.

The western grey kangaroo is not found in the north or the far southeast of Australia, and the eastern grey does not extend beyond the New South Wales–South Australia border, but the two species are both common in the Murray–Darling basin area. They never interbreed in the wild, although it has proved possible to produce hybrids between eastern grey females and western grey males in captivity.

=== Subspecies ===
There are two subspecies:

- Macropus fuliginosus fuliginosus (commonly known as the Kangaroo Island western grey kangaroo or simply Kangaroo Island grey kangaroo) is endemic to Kangaroo Island, South Australia
- Macropus fuliginosus melanops has a range of different forms that intergrade clinally from west to east.

== Description ==
The western grey kangaroo is one of the largest macropods in Australia. It weighs 28–54 kg (62–120 lb) and its length is 0.84–1.1 m (2 ft 9 in – 3 ft 7 in) with a 0.80–1.0 m (2 ft 7 in – 3 ft 3 in) tail, standing approximately 1.3 m (4 ft 3 in) tall. It exhibits sexual dimorphism with the male up to twice the size of female. It has thick, coarse fur with colour ranging from pale grey to brown; its throat, chest and belly have a paler colour.

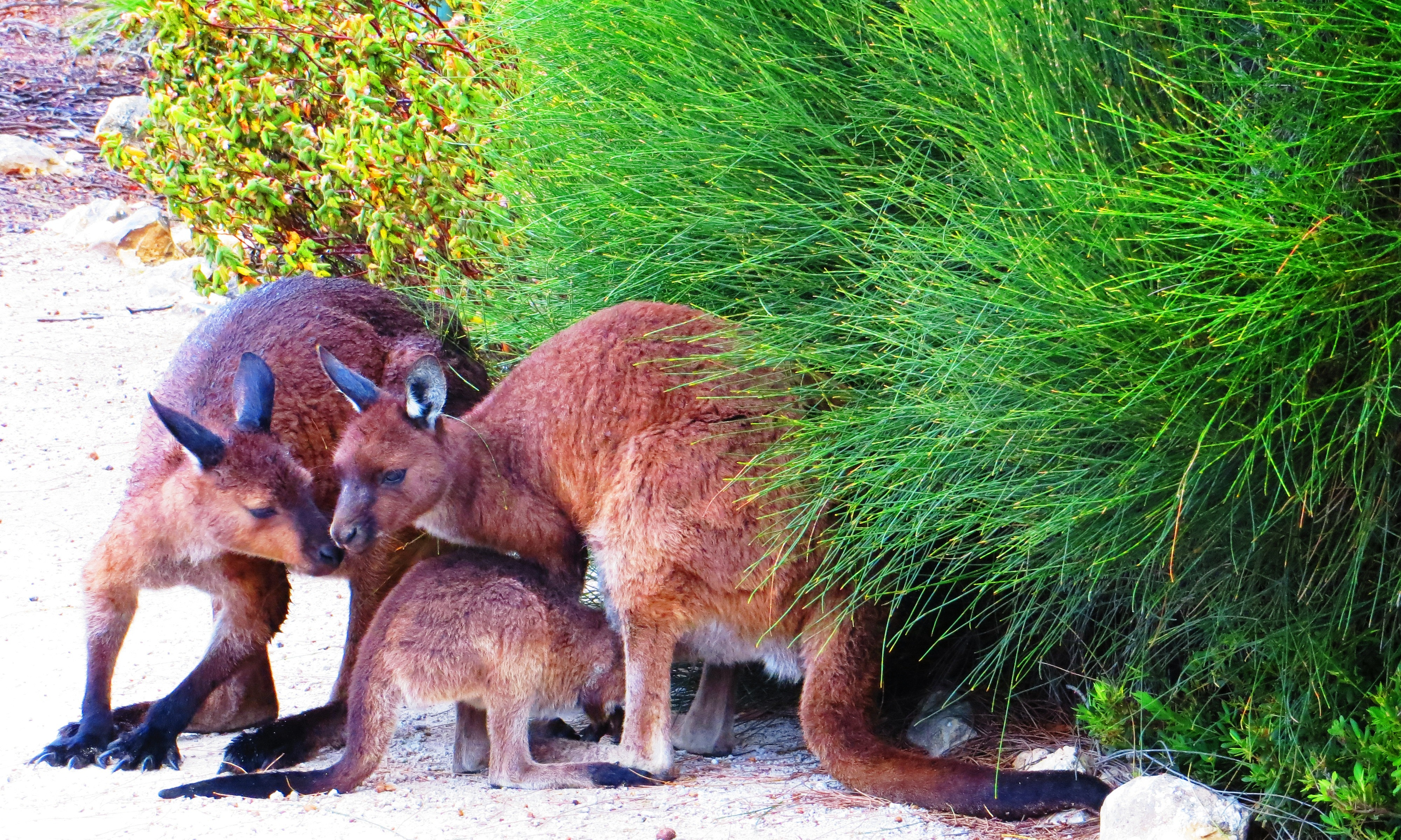
family of Flinders Chase National Park, Kangaroo Island

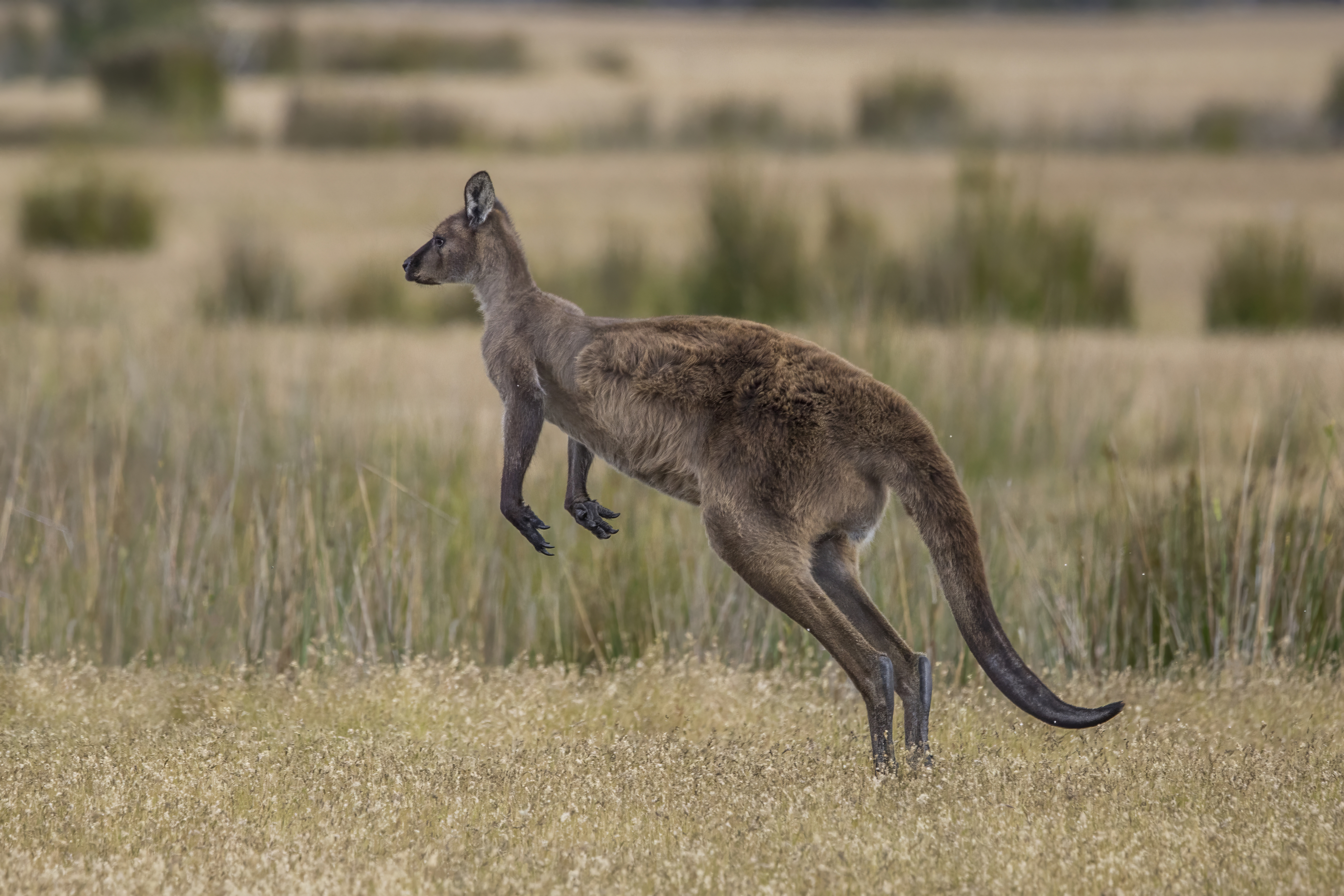
hopping, Kangaroo Island

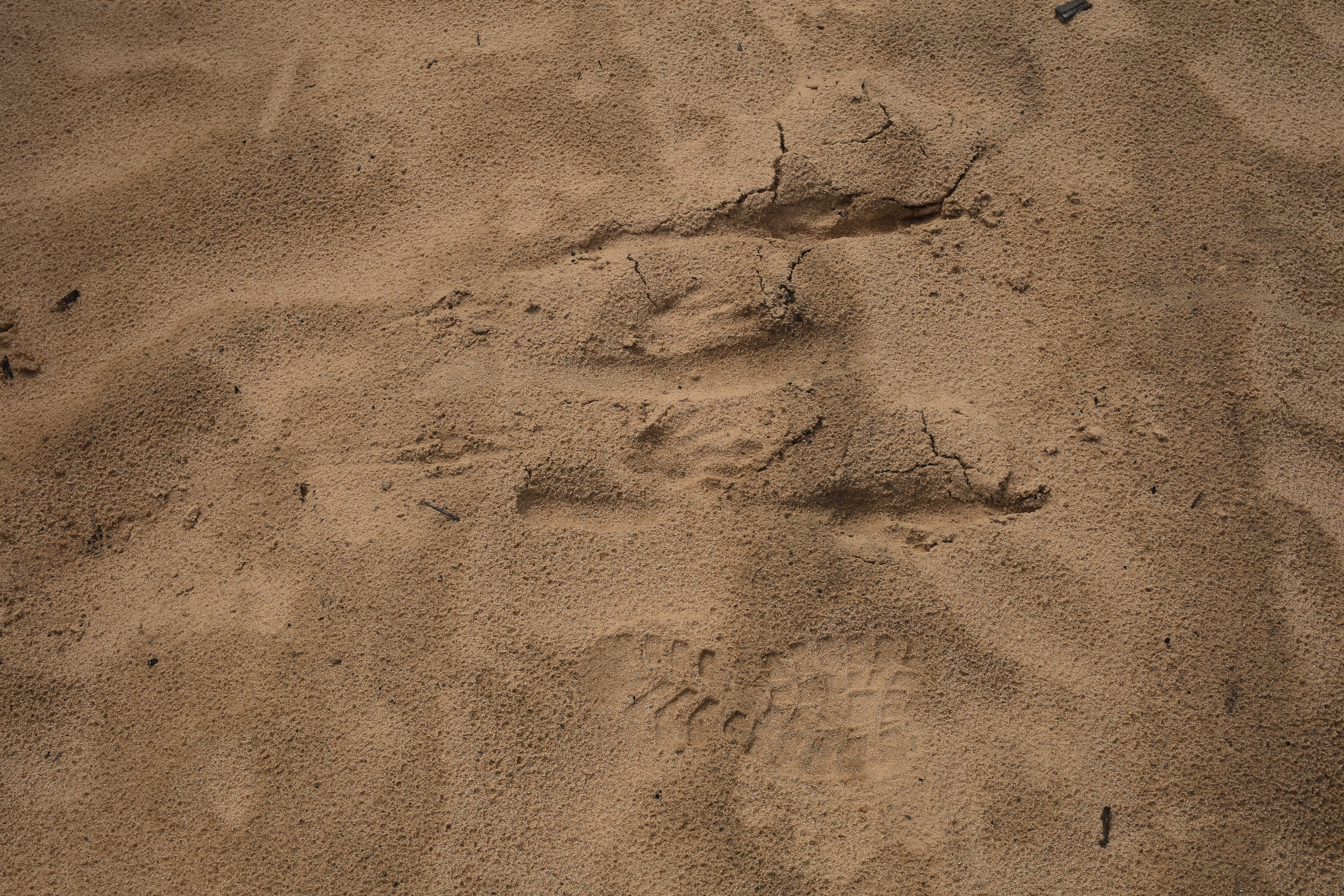
tracks at Wyperfeld National Park in Victoria

This species is difficult to distinguish from its sibling species, the eastern grey kangaroo (Macropus giganteus). However, the western grey kangaroo has darker grey-brown fur, darker colouration around the head, and sometimes has a blackish patch around the elbow.

== Ecology and behaviour ==
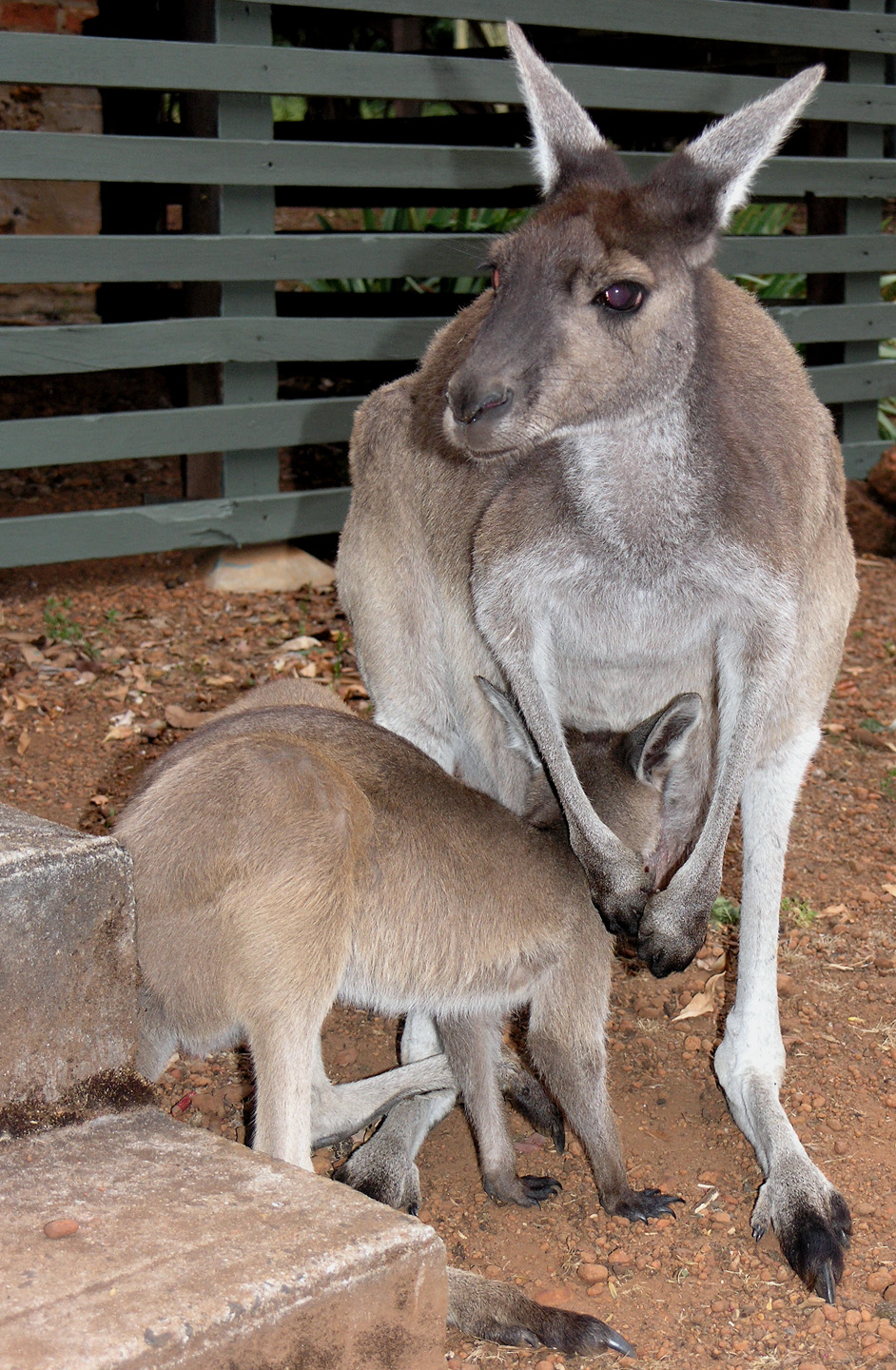
A mother with a joey photographed at the Donnelly Mills in Western Australia

=== Diet ===
It feeds at night, mainly on grasses and forbs but also on leafy shrubs and low trees. During the Late Pleistocene, its diet was more varied and incorporated a greater proportion of C_{4} plants relative to that of present western grey kangaroos. It has a nickname "stinker" because mature males have a distinctive curry-like odour.

=== Thermoregulation ===
The western grey kangaroo is a nocturnal species that varies its core body temperature based on daily ambient temperatures. The kangaroo's lowest daily core body temperature occurs mid-morning. In the summer, this was 2.2 °C (4 °F) lower than during cooler spring days. This reduced summer body temperature is thought to allow the species to conserve energy during a time when food availability is low.

=== Reproduction and development ===
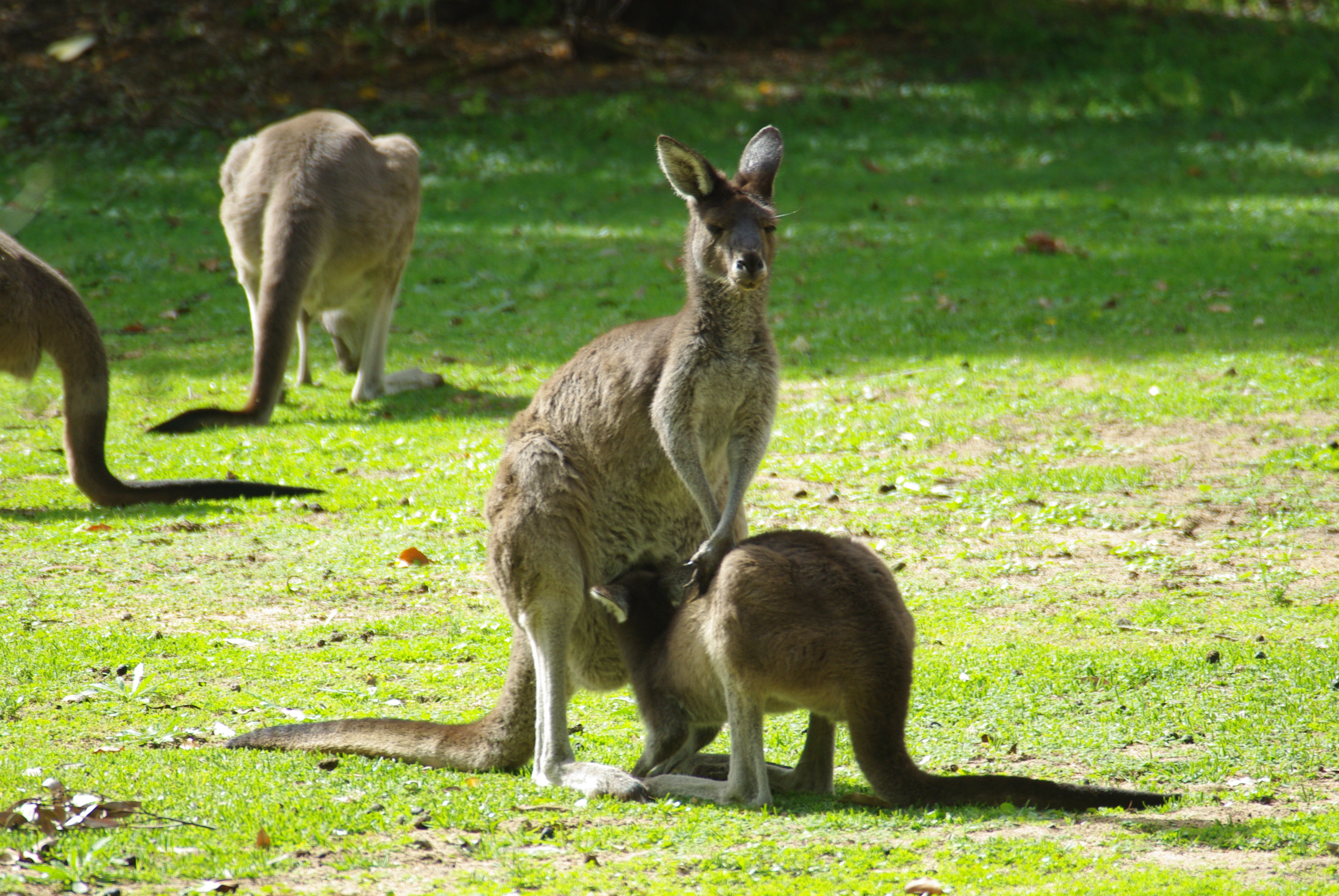
A female suckling her joey at the Darling range in Western Australia

The western grey kangaroo lives in groups of up to 15, and the males compete for females during the breeding season. During these "boxing" contests, they lock arms and try to push each other over. Usually, only the dominant male in the group mates. The gestation period is 30–31 days, after which the incompletely developed fetus (referred to as a joey) attaches to the teat in the pouch for 130–150 days. Females reach sexual maturity at 17 months while males mature at around 20 months.

The western grey kangaroo is closely related to the eastern grey kangaroo (M. giganteus), and their distribution overlaps extensively, especially in the Murray–Darling basin. However, the two species interbreed only rarely in the wild. Although hybridisation occurs in both directions in the overlap zone between the two species, this does not seem to be the case with captive animals. Although interbreeding between the two species does occasionally occur in captive animals, viable offspring are only produced when the mating pair consists of a female eastern grey kangaroo and a male western grey kangaroo. This is an example of unidirectional hybridisation.

== Relationship with humans ==
The western grey kangaroo is classified as Least Concern by the IUCN Red List, with a population showing an increasing trend. Total population within the commercial harvest areas is estimated to be around 3,800,000 individuals in 2020.

Though the feeding habits of M. fuliginosus can be problematic for agriculture, it is protected and controlled exclusively by the state faunal authorities. Because it is considered a competitor for water and pasture by ranchers, this species is considered a pest in some areas. To limit agricultural damage, kangaroo culling has been allowed under license every year.

Commercial hunting for meat and skin also allowed under regulation, with skins providing a high-quality, long-lasting leather. About 40% of harvested meat is used for human consumption; leather is used as a material for handbags, briefcases, and belts.

Commercial hunting is permitted in New South Wales, mainland South Australia, and Western Australia, but prohibited in Tasmania, Northern Territory and Kangaroo Island.
