= Okawa Point =

Coordinates: 43°46′24″S 176°14′30″W

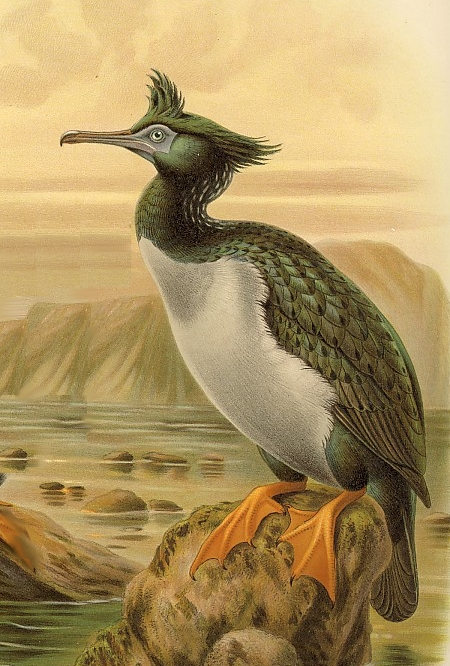
Pitt shag, illustrated by Keulemans

Okawa Point lies at the north-eastern end of Hanson Bay near the easternmost point of the main Chatham Island in the Chatham Islands group of New Zealand. It has been identified as an Important Bird Area by BirdLife International because it supports breeding colonies of the critically endangered Chatham and endangered Pitt shags.

The New Zealand Ministry for Culture and Heritage gives a translation of "place of bitter (water)" for Ōkawa.
