= Radio Weka =

Radio station in the Chatham Islands

Radio Weka (callsign 3WKA) was a volunteer-run radio station in the Chatham Islands. It broadcast from Waitangi on the FM band. The station is now defunct. Its volunteers doubled as DJs.

== History ==
Radio Weka was already operational by 1990. Apart from imperfect radio transmissions from the mainland, it was the only station available locally. As of 1993, its breakfast announcer was Stephanie Day. On Tuesday mornings, it aired Cop Spot, produced by the local police station.

Efforts were being made in 1994 to bring Weka under the Chatham Islands Television and Radio Society, which also oversaw Chatham Islands Television since 1991. By mid-1997, the station was on strike. The station likely closed before 2005; this is likely because of the dissolution of the Chatham Islands Television and Radio Society.
