= Nairn River =

River on Chatham Island, New Zealand

Coordinates: 43°57′S 176°33′W

Location
- Country: New Zealand

Physical characteristics
- Mouth
  - location: Petre Bay
- Length: 14 km (8.7 mi)
- Basin size: 6,600 hectares (16,000 acres)

The Nairn River, also known as the Mangatukurewa Creek, is a river in the Chatham Islands of New Zealand. Located in the southwest of Chatham Island, it runs north to reach the coast close to the southern end of Petre Bay. The main settlement of the Chatham Islands, Waitangi, stands close to the mouth of the Nairn River.
