= Waitangi, Chatham Islands =

Largest settlement on the Chatham Islands, New Zealand

Waitangi Waiteki (Moriori)
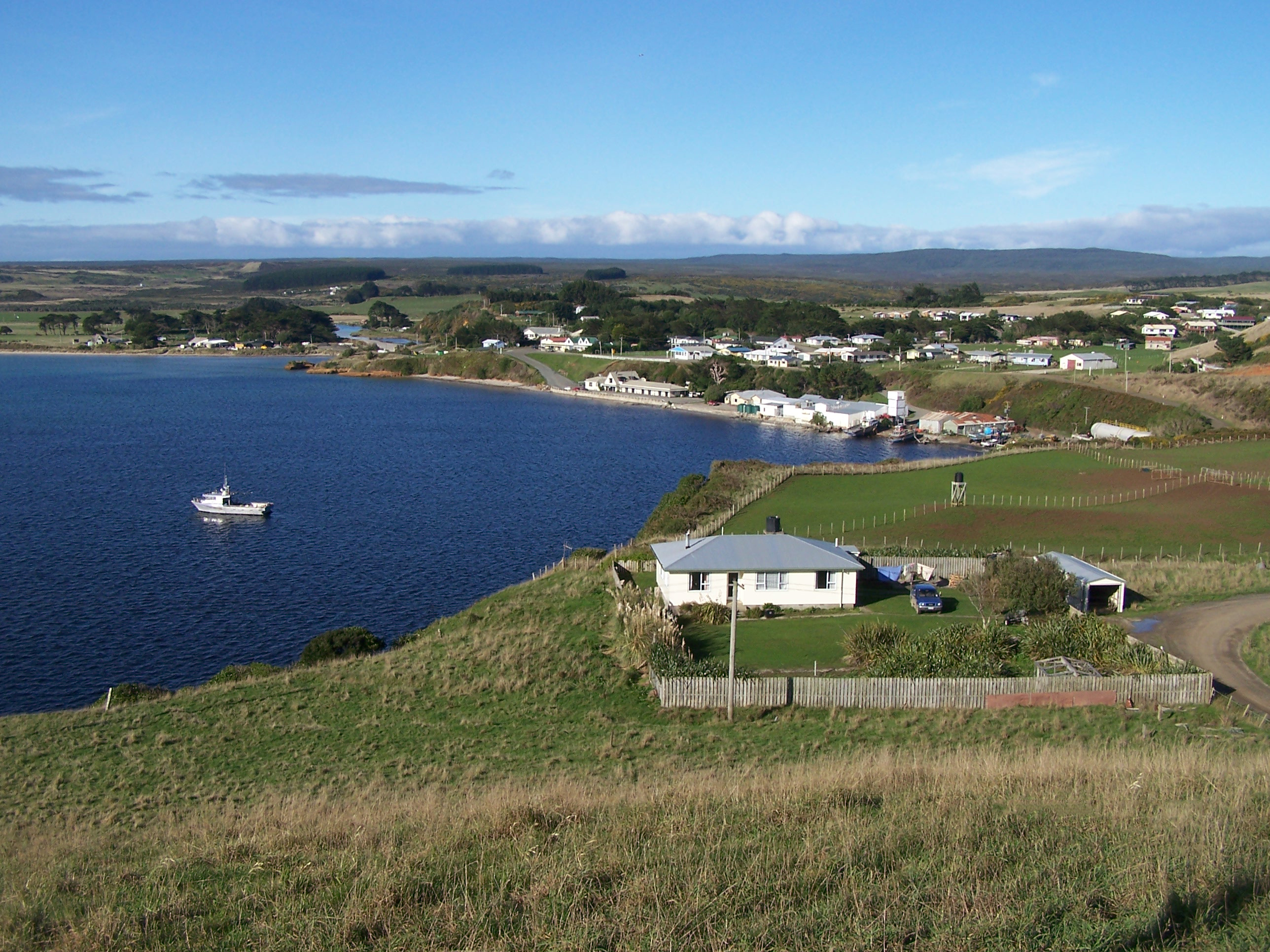
- Waitangi in May 2008

- Location within Oceania Location within Chatham Islands
- Coordinates: 43°57′05″S 176°33′40″W
- Country: New Zealand
- Territorial authority: Chatham Islands
- Electorates: Wellington Bays; Te Tai Tonga (Māori)

Government
  - Mayor of Chatham Islands: Greg Horler
  - Wellington Bays MP: TBD
  - Te Tai Tonga MP: Mananui Ramsden

Area
  - Total: 4.86 km^{2} (1.88 sq mi)

Population (June 2025)
  - Total: 140
  - Density: 29/km^{2} (75/sq mi)
- Time zone: Chatham Standard Time Zone

Waitangi (originally called Waiteki by Moriori) is the main port and largest settlement of the Chatham Islands of New Zealand. It is situated on the southern shore of Petre Bay, on the west coast of the archipelago's main island. Waitangi is by far the largest settlement on the archipelago, with its population estimated at 140 of the group's 620 people, as of June 2025.

== Geography ==
Waitangi is situated along the west coast of Chatham Island between the southern end of Waitangi Bay and the northern foothills of the island's southern plateau. The Nairn River flows north through the settlement before emptying into the bay. Lake Huro lies about 2 km (1.2 mi) to the east, and the settlement of Te One 4 km (2.5 mi) to the north.

Waitangi has the particularity of being the antipode of a small French village: Alzon, located in the Gard.

=== Climate ===
Waitangi experiences an oceanic climate with mild temperatures throughout the year. Precipitation can fall at any time throughout the year, with the highest percent of rain being centred during the winter.

Climate data for Waitangi, Chatham Islands
Month	Jan	Feb	Mar	Apr	May	Jun	Jul	Aug	Sep	Oct	Nov	Dec	Year
Mean daily maximum °C (°F)	17.8 (64.0)	18.1 (64.6)	17.3 (63.1)	15.4 (59.7)	13.4 (56.1)	11.5 (52.7)	10.9 (51.6)	11.4 (52.5)	12.3 (54.1)	13.2 (55.8)	14.6 (58.3)	16.5 (61.7)	14.4 (57.9)
Daily mean °C (°F)	14.8 (58.6)	15.1 (59.2)	14.4 (57.9)	12.5 (54.5)	10.5 (50.9)	8.8 (47.8)	8.0 (46.4)	8.6 (47.5)	9.5 (49.1)	10.6 (51.1)	11.9 (53.4)	13.7 (56.7)	11.5 (52.8)
Mean daily minimum °C (°F)	11.9 (53.4)	12.2 (54.0)	11.5 (52.7)	9.7 (49.5)	7.6 (45.7)	6.2 (43.2)	5.2 (41.4)	5.8 (42.4)	6.7 (44.1)	8.0 (46.4)	9.3 (48.7)	11.0 (51.8)	8.8 (47.8)
Average precipitation mm (inches)	52 (2.0)	56 (2.2)	85 (3.3)	74 (2.9)	90 (3.5)	93 (3.7)	109 (4.3)	79 (3.1)	68 (2.7)	56 (2.2)	53 (2.1)	71 (2.8)	886 (34.9)
Source: http://en.climate-data.org/location/475472/

== History ==
The navigator Kahu who came to Rekohu on the waka Otane planted kumara at Waiteki and when it would not grow he returned to Hawaiki, Moriori lived there until Ngāti Mutunga and Ngāti Tama migrated to the Chatham Islands in 1835, Ngāti Tama took control of the prime location of Waitangi, breaking an agreement with Ngāti Mutunga to wait until all the migrants had arrived before dividing up the land. In May 1838 the French whaling ship Jean Bart anchored in Waitangi Bay. Māori from both tribes went aboard the ship to barter, but started arguing with each other. It seems that the captain misinterpreted the antagonism of the two Māori groups as being aimed at the French rather than at each other. He panicked and had his crew attack the Māori, killing a number, and raised anchor and set sail. Māori got hold of the ship's guns and started shooting at the crew, killing two. The crew took to the boats, abandoning the ship and disappearing out to sea. The Māori sailed the ship back to land but it was wrecked on rocks, then was looted and burned by Ngāti Mutunga. The French warship Heroine, which was in the Bay of Islands, heard of the incident and sailed to Chatham Island to take reprisal in October 1838. It bombarded Waitangi, then sent a party ashore to burn all the structures, and captured several men, taking them to France. The killings of men aboard the Jean Bart and the capture of several others by the Heroine weakened Ngāti Tama relative to their Ngāti Mutunga rivals. Ngāti Mutunga besieged Ngāti Tama in their pā near the mouth of the Nairn River in 1839–40 and after several months forced them to abandon Waitangi.

== Demographics ==
Waitangi is described as a rural settlement by Statistics New Zealand, and covers 4.86 km^{2} (1.88 sq mi). It had an estimated population of 140 as of June 2025, with a population density of 29 people per km^{2}.

Historical population
Year	Pop.	±% p.a.
2006	189	—
2013	168	−1.67%
2018	177	+1.05%
2023	144	−4.04%

Waitangi had a population of 144 in the 2023 New Zealand census, a decrease of 33 people (−18.6%) since the 2018 census, and a decrease of 24 people (−14.3%) since the 2013 census. There were 63 males, 78 females, and 3 people of other genders in 69 dwellings. 4.2% of people identified as LGBTIQ+. The median age was 44.9 years (compared with 38.1 years nationally). There were 21 people (14.6%) aged under 15 years, 30 (20.8%) aged 15 to 29, 69 (47.9%) aged 30 to 64, and 24 (16.7%) aged 65 or older.

People could identify as more than one ethnicity. The results were 62.5% European (Pākehā); 72.9% Māori; 6.2% Pasifika; 4.2% Asian; and 4.2% Middle Eastern, Latin American and African New Zealanders (MELAA). English was spoken by 97.9%, Māori by 12.5%, and other languages by 4.2%. New Zealand Sign Language was known by 2.1%. The percentage of people born overseas was 6.2, compared with 28.8% nationally.

Religious affiliations were 35.4% Christian, 2.1% Hindu, 4.2% Māori religious beliefs, and 2.1% New Age. People who answered that they had no religion were 47.9%, and 8.3% of people did not answer the census question.

Of those at least 15 years old, 12 (9.8%) people had a bachelor's or higher degree, 78 (63.4%) had a post-high school certificate or diploma, and 36 (29.3%) people exclusively held high school qualifications. The median income was $47,200, compared with $41,500 nationally. 9 people (7.3%) earned over $100,000 compared to 12.1% nationally. The employment status of those at least 15 was 72 (58.5%) full-time, 18 (14.6%) part-time, and 3 (2.4%) unemployed.

== Arts and culture ==
Kōpinga Marae (Moriori for "Grove of Kopi Trees") is a large meeting house that sits atop Te Awapatiki, the traditional meeting ground of the Moriori. The meeting house opened in January 2005 and serves as both a cultural centre and more generally as a community centre for the people of Waitangi. When viewed from above, the complex takes on the shape of an albatross.

== Administration and services ==
Waitangi is the seat of Chatham Islands Council, which provides local administration equivalent to those of New Zealand's unitary authorities. The council hosts a visiting District Court Judge, and is the base of a local police constable. A doctor and two nurses staff a four-bedroom hospital facility.

Primary school children attend Te One School, the Chathams' biggest school, 4 km (2.5 mi) from Waitangi. Most continue their secondary education in mainland New Zealand.

Local services in Waitangi include Port Waitangi and Fish Processing Factory, an ANZ Bank and Post Office, liquor store, general store, burger cafe, and a hotel and pub. Local volunteers run radio station Radio Weka and rebroadcast New Zealand television. Broadband and 4G mobile phone coverage are available through Spark, 2degrees and One NZ; through a RCG network, as well as satellite and ADSL broadband services.
