= Ogawa (disambiguation) =

Ogawa is a Japanese surname.

Ogawa may also refer to:

== Places ==
- Ogawa, Ibaraki (Higashiibaraki)-machi, town incorporated into Omitama City, Ibaraki Prefecture
- Ogawa, Ibaraki (Naka)-mura, village incorporated into Hitachiōta City, Ibaraki Prefecture
- Ogawa, Kumamoto-machi, town incorporated into Uki City, Kumamoto Prefecture
- Ogawa, Nagano-mura, village in Kamiminochi District, Nagano Prefecture
- Ogawa, Saitama-machi, town in Hiki District, Saitama Prefecture
- Ogawa, Tochigi-machi, town incorporated into Nakagawa Town, Nasu District, Tochigi Prefecture
- Ogawa-machi (or Ogawa-chō), town incorporated into Iwaki City, Fukushima Prefecture

== Companies ==
- Ogawa Seiki model aircraft engine company, founded by Shigeo Ogawa
