= Ōkawa (surname) =

Ōkawa, Okawa, Ookawa or Ohkawa (written: 大川 or 大河, literally "big river") is a Japanese surname. Notable people with the surname include:

- Heizaburo Okawa (大川 平三郎; born 1939), Japanese fencer
- Hisayuki Okawa (born 1971), athlete
- Misao Okawa (1898–2015), Japanese supercentenarian
- Nanase Ohkawa (born 1967), Japanese manga writer
- Ryuho Okawa (1956–2023), religious and political leader
- Shūmei Ōkawa (1886–1957), Japanese nationalist, Pan-Asian writer, indicted war criminal, and Islamic scholar
- Tihiro Ohkawa (大河千弘; 1928–2014), Japanese plasma physicist
- Tōru Ōkawa (born 1960), Japanese actor
- Narumi Okawa (大川 成美; born 1990), Japanese AV idol
