= Lake Pateriki =

Lake in Chatham Island, New Zealand

- Location within Chatham Islands
- Interactive map of Lake Pateriki
- Location: Chatham Island, New Zealand
- Coordinates: 43°45′10″S 176°18′31″W
- Type: Lake
- Primary inflows: Three streams
- Primary outflows: Pacific Ocean (intermittently)
- Basin countries: New Zealand
- Surface area: 134 hectares (330 acres)
- Average depth: 1.3 metres (4.3 ft)

Lake Pateriki (Māori pronunciation: [ˈpatɛɾiki]) is a brackish coastal dune lake in northeastern Chatham Island, New Zealand.

== Description ==
Lake Pateriki is a coastal dune lake on northeastern Chatham Island, New Zealand, near the village of Kaiangaroa. Described as brown/yellow or tea coloured, it has a depth of 1.3 metres (4.3 ft) and an area of 134 hectares (330 acres). A narrow sand dune separates its northern shore from the Pacific Ocean; this allows for intermittent outflow to the sea and inflow of saltwater, leading to around 50% seawater by volume. Three streams flow into the lake. It is mildly alkaline, like most other lakes on Chatham Island.

== Bibliography ==
- Meredith, Adrian S.; Croucher, Robyn (2007). State of the environment monitoring: water quality and ecosystem health of the lakes, streams and Te Whanga, Chatham Island/Rekohu/Wharekauri (PDF) (Report). Chatham Islands Council. ISBN 978-0-9582920-1-6.
