= Hanson Bay =

Large bay on the east coast of Chatham Island

Coordinates: 43.885°S 176.372°W

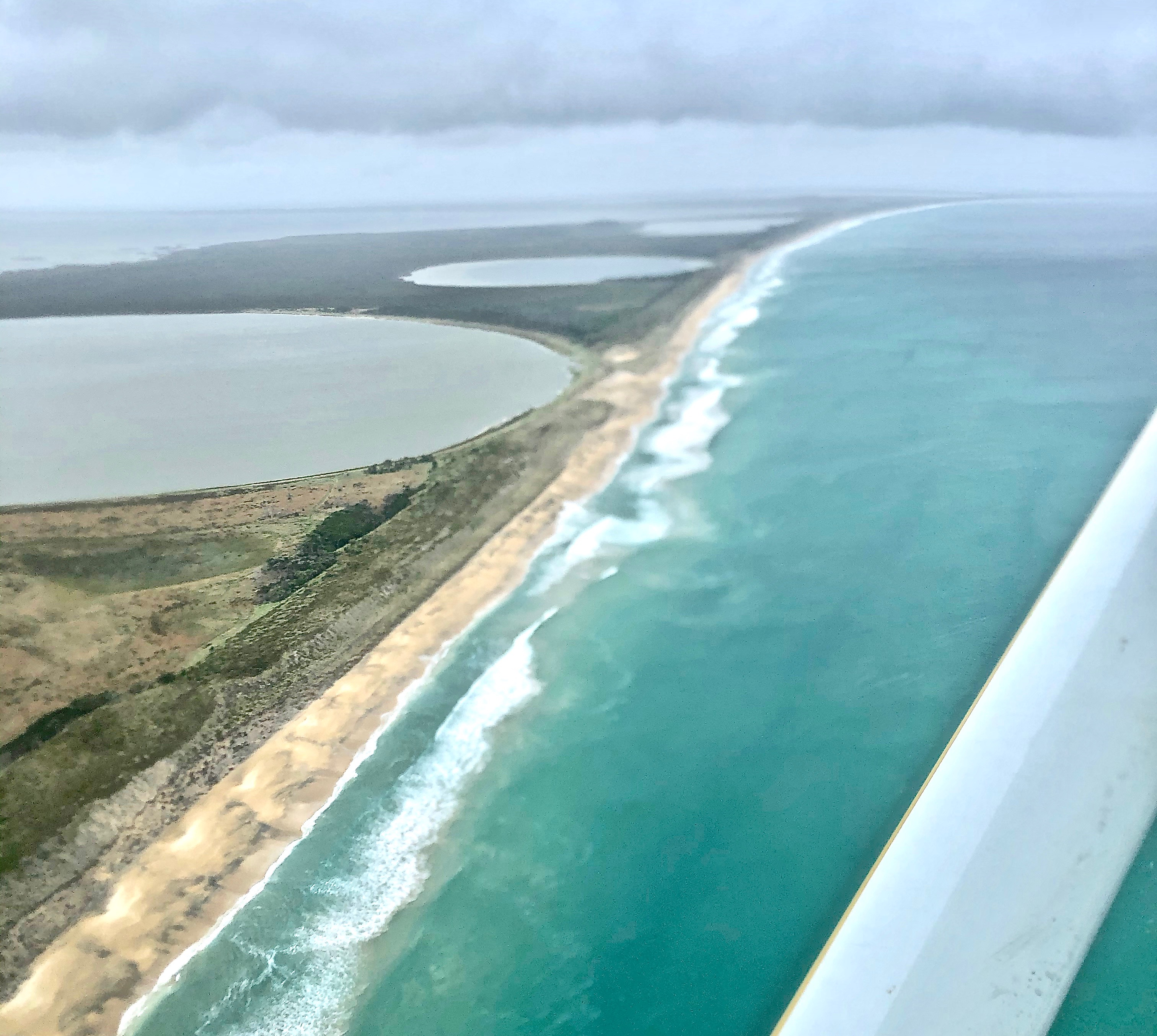
Hanson Bay and Lakes Kairae, Makuku, Kaingarahu and Whanga Lagoon

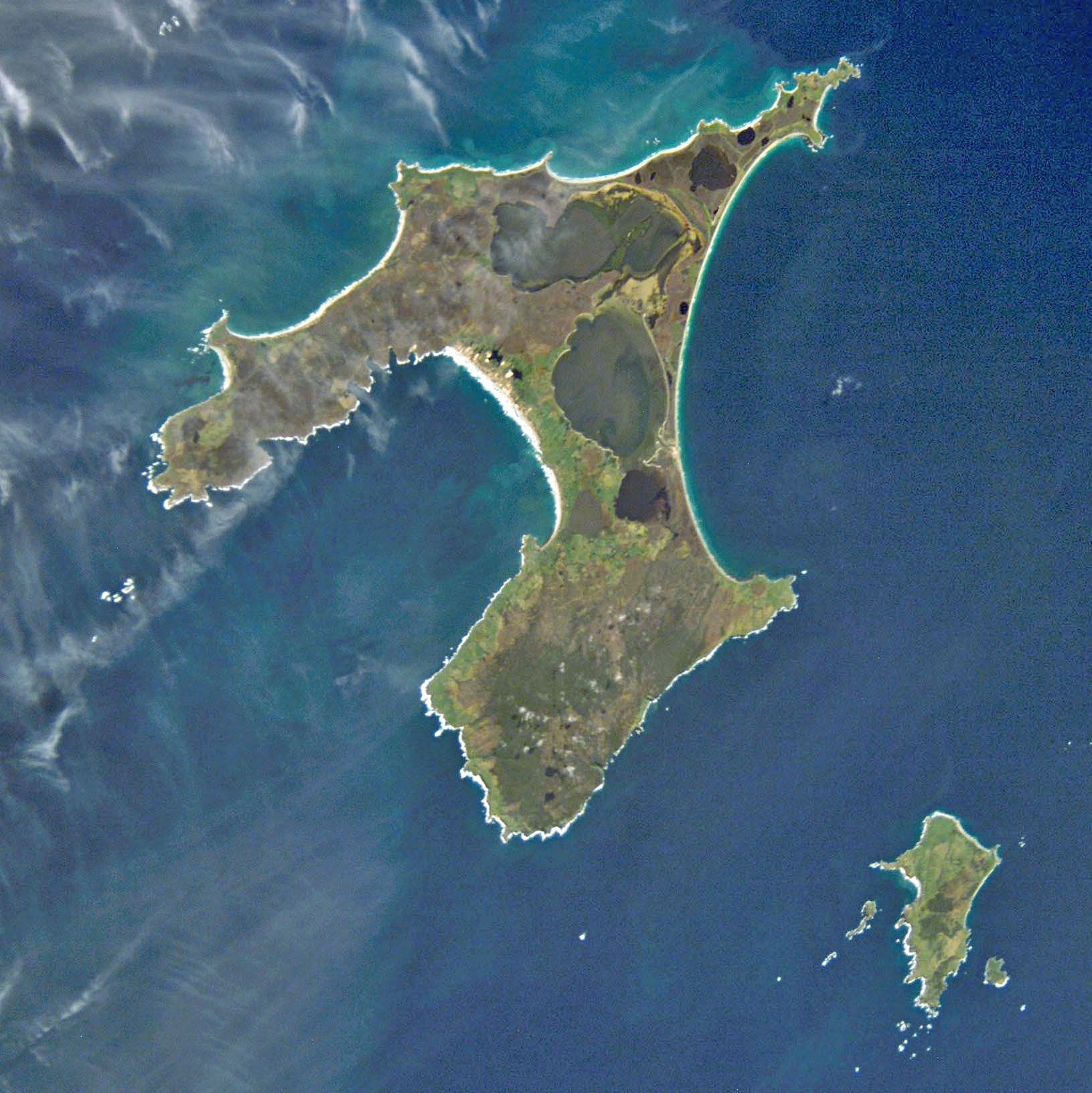
The Chatham Islands from space. Hanson Bay is shown at the right of the main island.

Hanson Bay is a large bay which comprises almost the entire east coast of Chatham Island, the largest island in New Zealand's Chatham Islands archipelago. It is 35 kilometres (22 mi) in extent, stretching from Okawa Point in the island's northeast to Manukau Point in the southeast. The bay may formerly have been used as a resting ground by southern right whales and dolphins.
