= Petre Bay =

Bay along the west coast of Chatham Island, New Zealand

Coordinates: 43°52′S 176°33′W

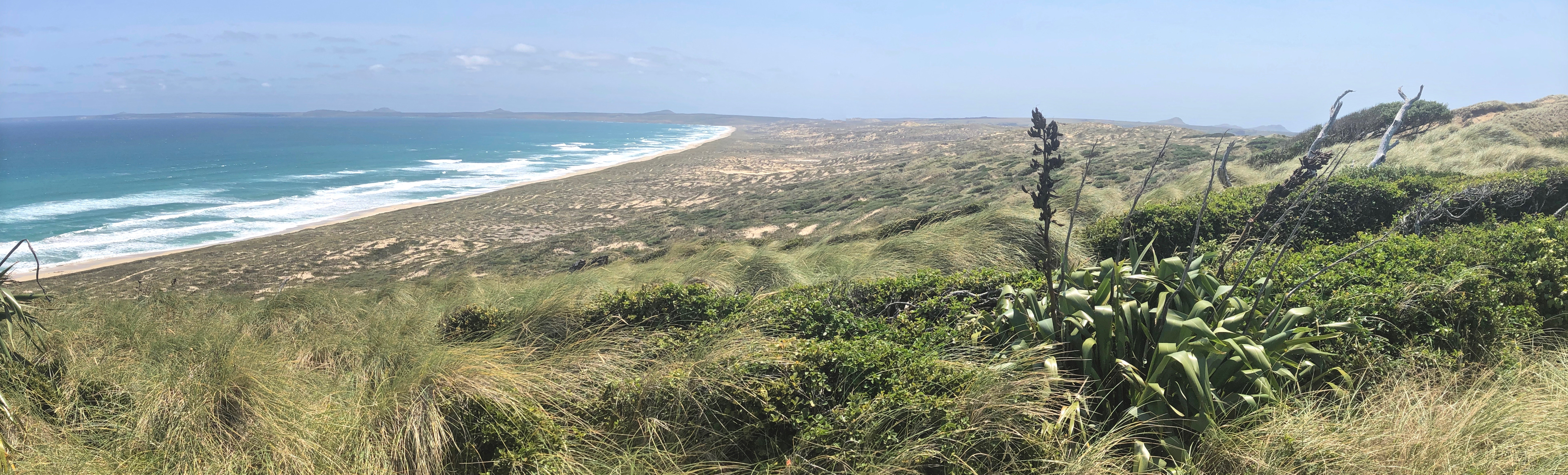
Long Beach, Petre Bay looking north

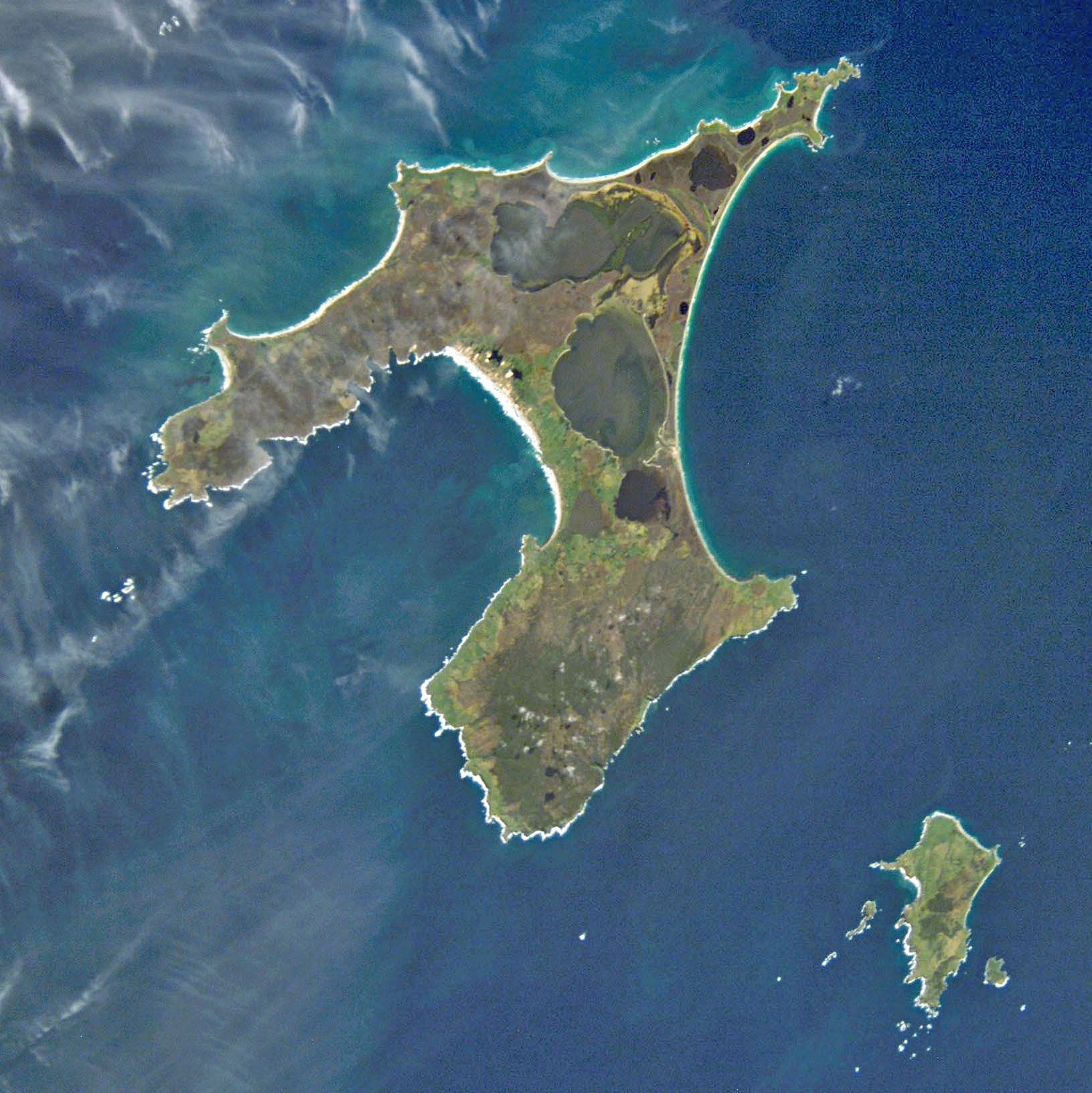
The Chatham Islands from space. Petre Bay is the large indentation in the left of the main island.

Petre Bay is a large bay which comprises about half of the west coast of Chatham Island, the largest island in New Zealand's Chatham Islands archipelago. It is some 20 kilometres (12 mi) in extent, and contains the far smaller Waitangi Bay, where the island group's largest settlement, Waitangi is located.

The bay is named after Lord Petre, a director of the New Zealand Company.
