= Te Whanga Lagoon =

Lagoon on Chatham Island, New Zealand

- Location within Chatham Islands

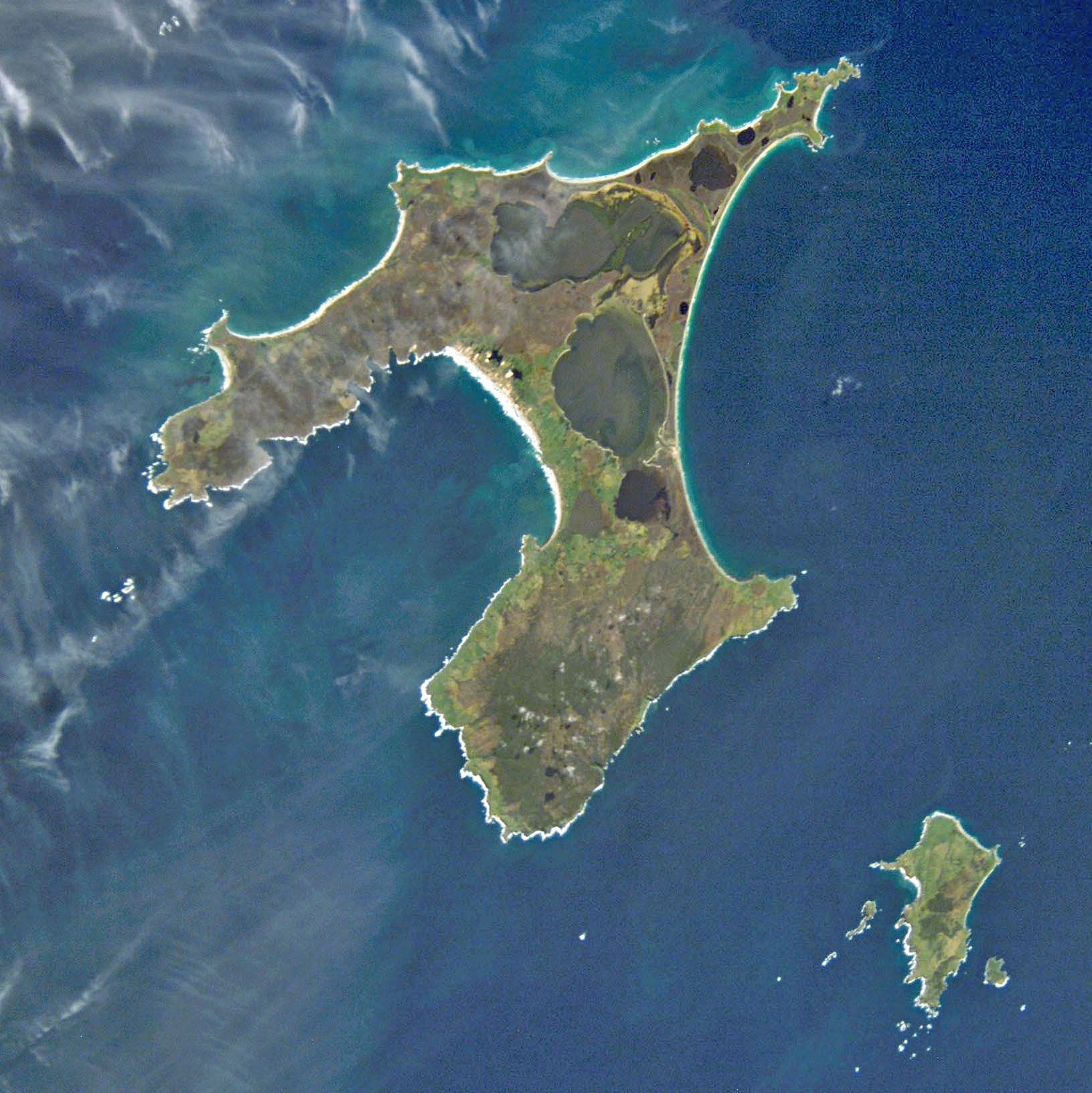
- The Chatham Islands from space
- Location: Chatham Island
- Coordinates: 43°52′S 176°28′W
- Basin countries: New Zealand
- Surface area: 150 square kilometres (58 sq mi)

Te Whanga Lagoon dominates the geography of Chatham Island, in the South Pacific Ocean off New Zealand's east coast. It covers 160 square kilometres (62 sq mi).

It is the outflow of several small rivers in the island's hilly south, and drains to the Pacific via gaps in Hanson Bay on the east coast of the island.

It contains many fossilized shark teeth that can be collected from the edges of the lagoon. Over time the lagoon is likely to silt up.

When first described by Dr E Dieffenbach in 1841, the lagoon was only slightly brackish and separated from the sea by a low sand bar and was about 2 feet (0.61 m) above high tide.

== Gallery ==
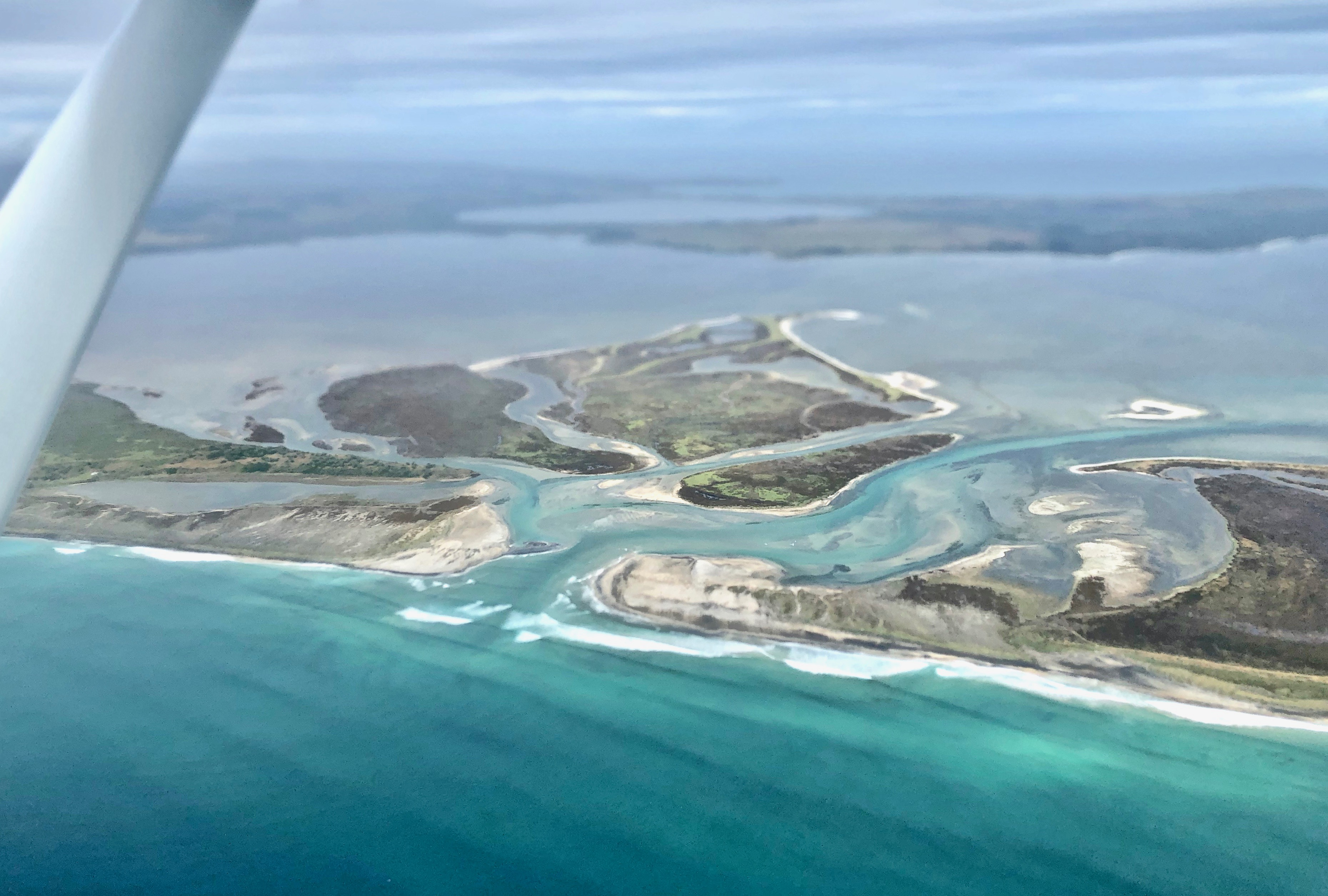
Hikurangi Channel, Te Whanga Lagoon. This drainage channel was dug in the 1880s to give more farmland

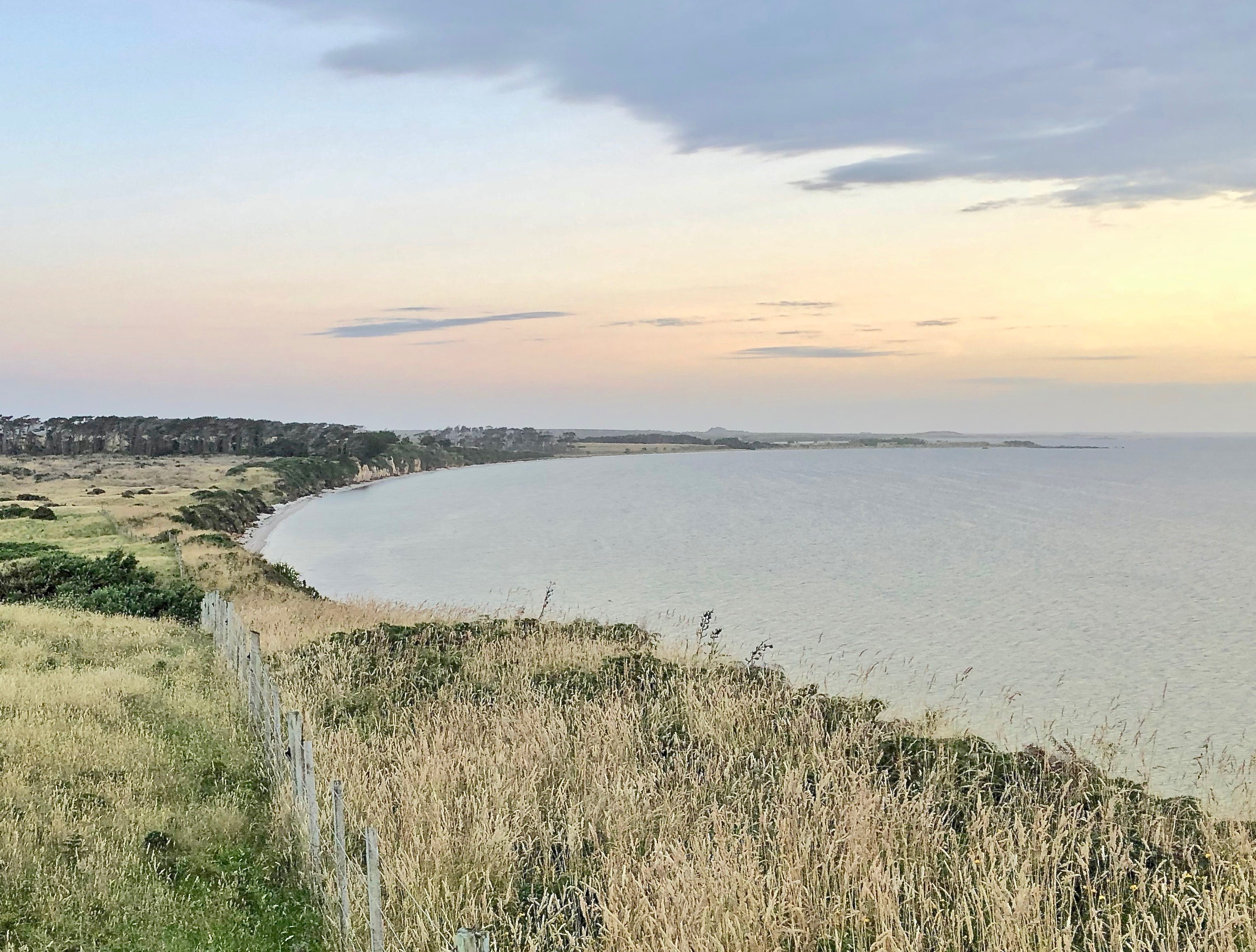
Waikato Point. Cliffs rise to about 30 m (98 ft) on the west coast of the lagoon

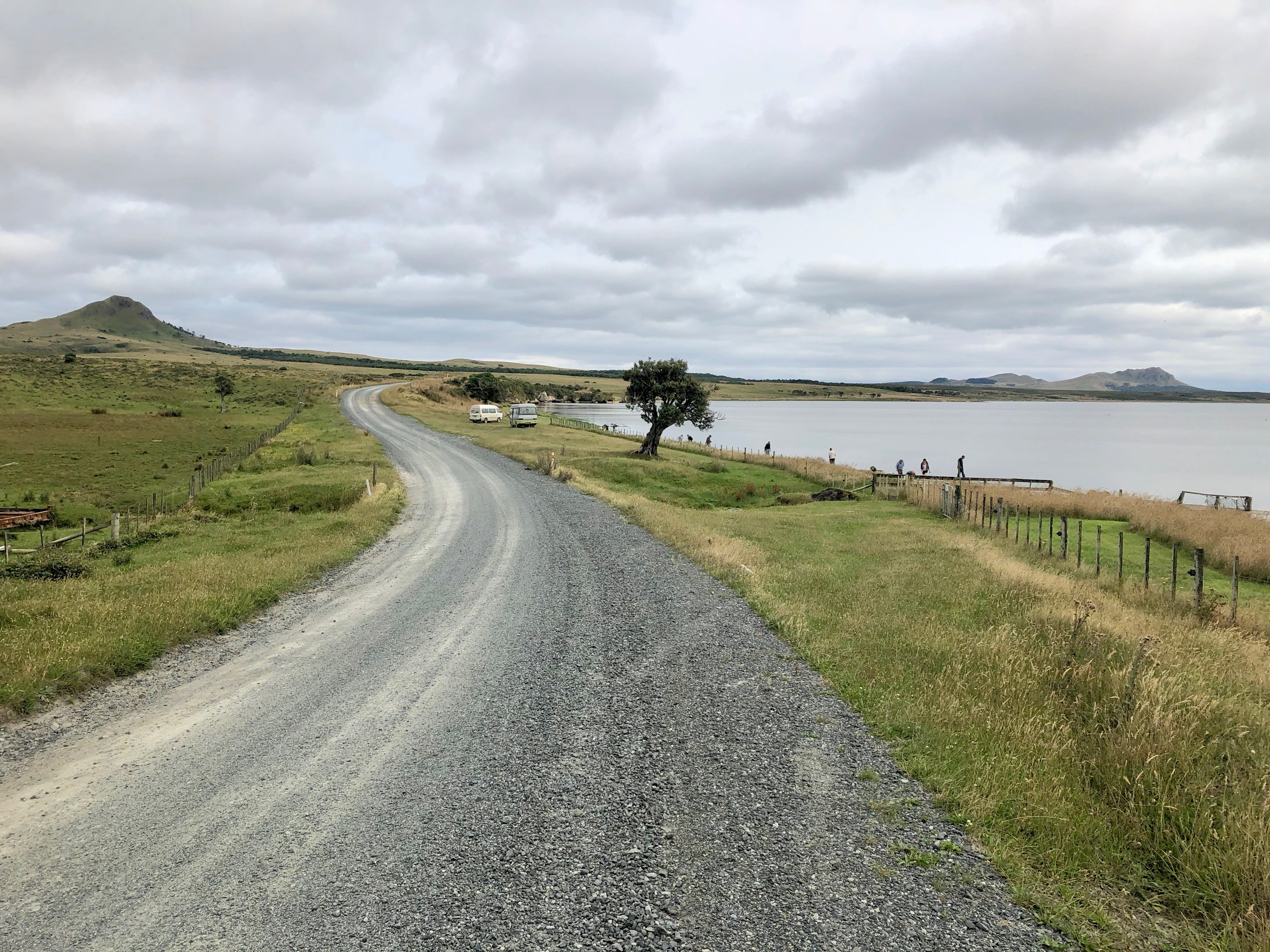
Te Whanga Lagoon at Blind Jims Creek. 178m Korako is to the left, 149m Rangitihi and 188m Mt Chudleigh to the right.

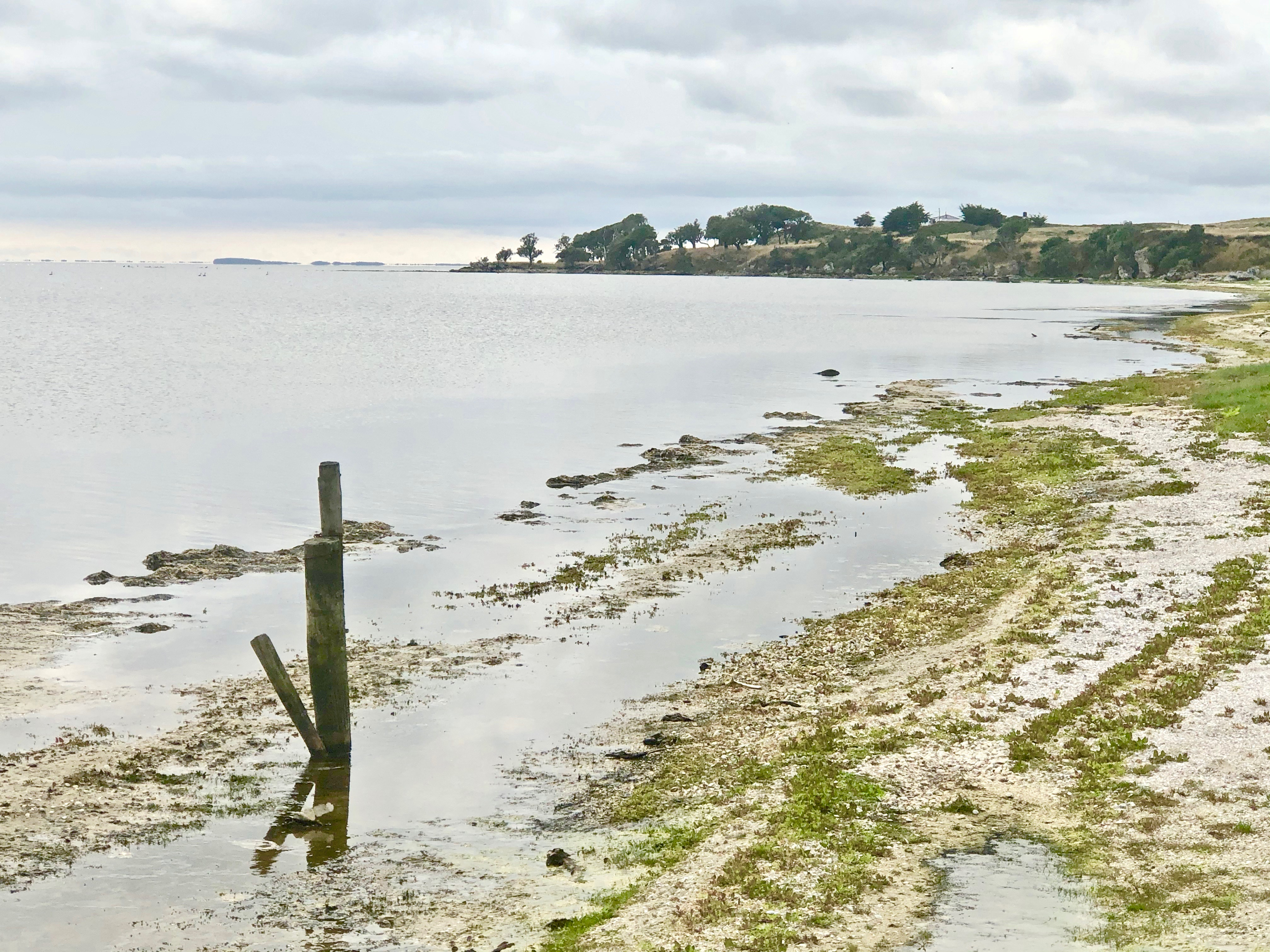
Cattle Point, Te Whanga Lagoon
