= Chatham Island =

South Pacific island east of New Zealand

Native name: Rēkohu (Moriori); Wharekauri (Māori)
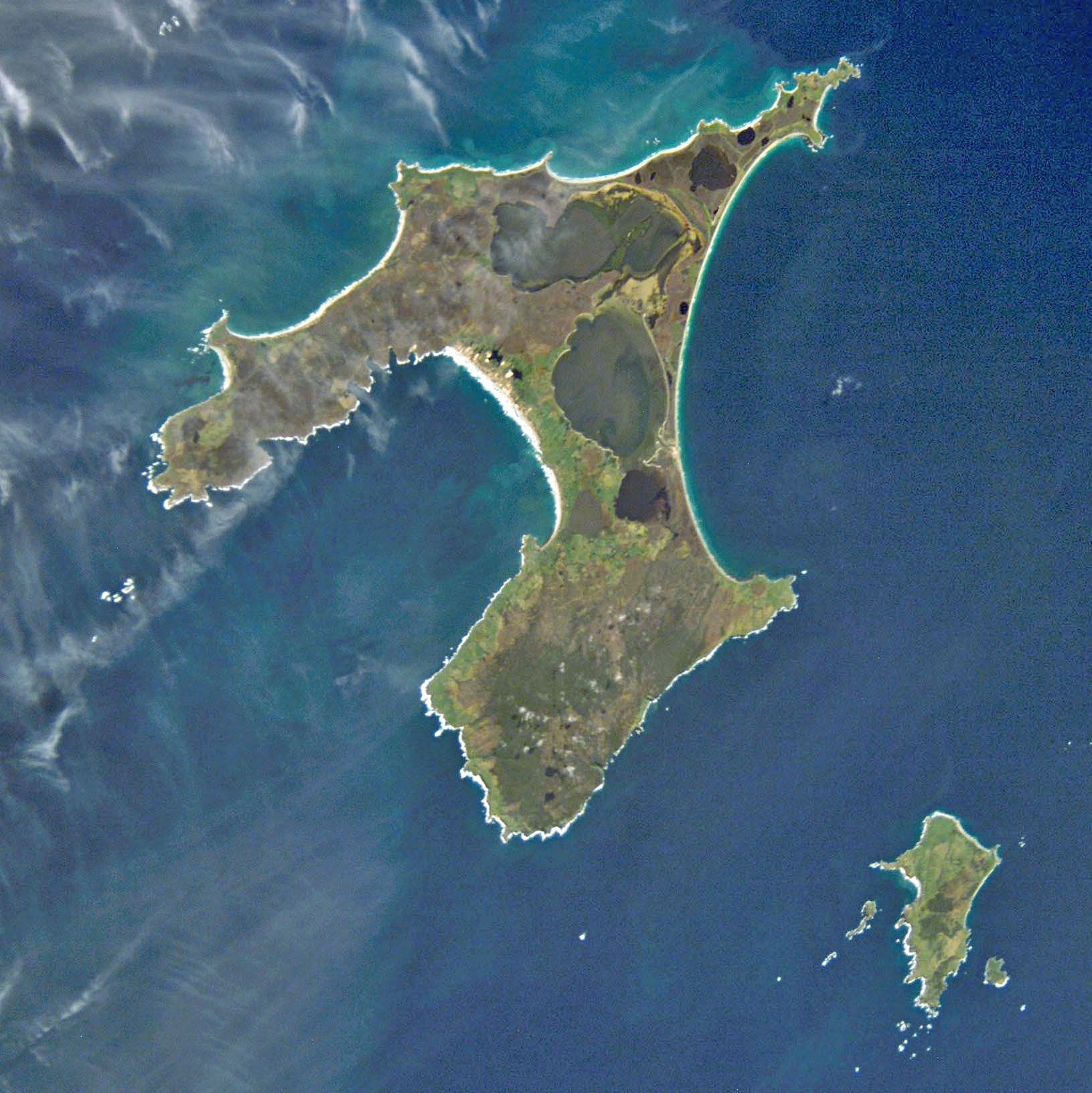
- Chatham Island (left) from space

- Map showing location of Chatham Island

Geography
- Coordinates: 43°54′S 176°29′W
- Archipelago: Chatham Islands
- Area: 920 km^{2} (360 sq mi)
- Highest elevation: 294 m (965 ft)
- Highest point: Maungatere Hill

Administration
- New Zealand

Demographics
- Population: 570 (2023 census)
- Pop. density: 0.79/km^{2} (2.05/sq mi)
- Ethnic groups: Moriori, Māori

Chatham Island (/ˈtʃætəm/ CHAT-əm; Moriori: Rēkohu, lit. 'Misty Sun'; Māori: Wharekauri) is the largest island of the Chatham Islands group, in the south Pacific Ocean off the eastern coast of New Zealand's South Island. It is said to be "halfway between the equator and the pole, and right on the International Date Line", although that point is 173 miles WSW of the island's westernmost point. The Moriori are the first settlers of the Chatham Islands. The island is called Rekohu ("misty skies") in Moriori, and Wharekauri in Māori.

The island was named after the survey ship HMS Chatham which was the first European ship to locate the island in 1791. It covers an area of 920 km^{2} (355 sq mi). Chatham Island lies 650 km (404 mi) south-east of Cape Turnagain, the nearest point of mainland New Zealand.

== Geography ==
The geography of the roughly T-shaped island is dominated by three features: two bays and a lagoon. More than half of the west coast of Chatham is taken up by the deep indentation of Petre Bay. The island's main settlement of Waitangi is located in a small indentation in Petre Bay's southern coast. Other significant settlements are Kaingaroa on the northeast promontory and Owenga on the south side of Hanson Bay.

On the east coast is the larger Hanson Bay, which stretches the full length of the island (35 kilometres (22 mi)).

Much of the area between the bays is taken up by the large Te Whanga Lagoon, which drains to the sea to the east, into the southern half of Hanson Bay. This lagoon covers about 160 square kilometres (62 sq mi), and drains several small rivers that rise in the hills at the south end of the island. The next largest lakes are Rangitahi and Huro, northeast and southwest of Te Whanga. The central and north part of Chatham Island are mostly flat, with altitudes ranging from a few metres on the northeast and centre to 50 m on the northwest, but with a few scattered hillocks. The south part is higher, generally sloping down towards north and west; about half of it is over 150 m above sea level. The south coast of the island is mostly cliffs 100 m high or more. The highest point of the island (299 m) lies close to its southernmost point.

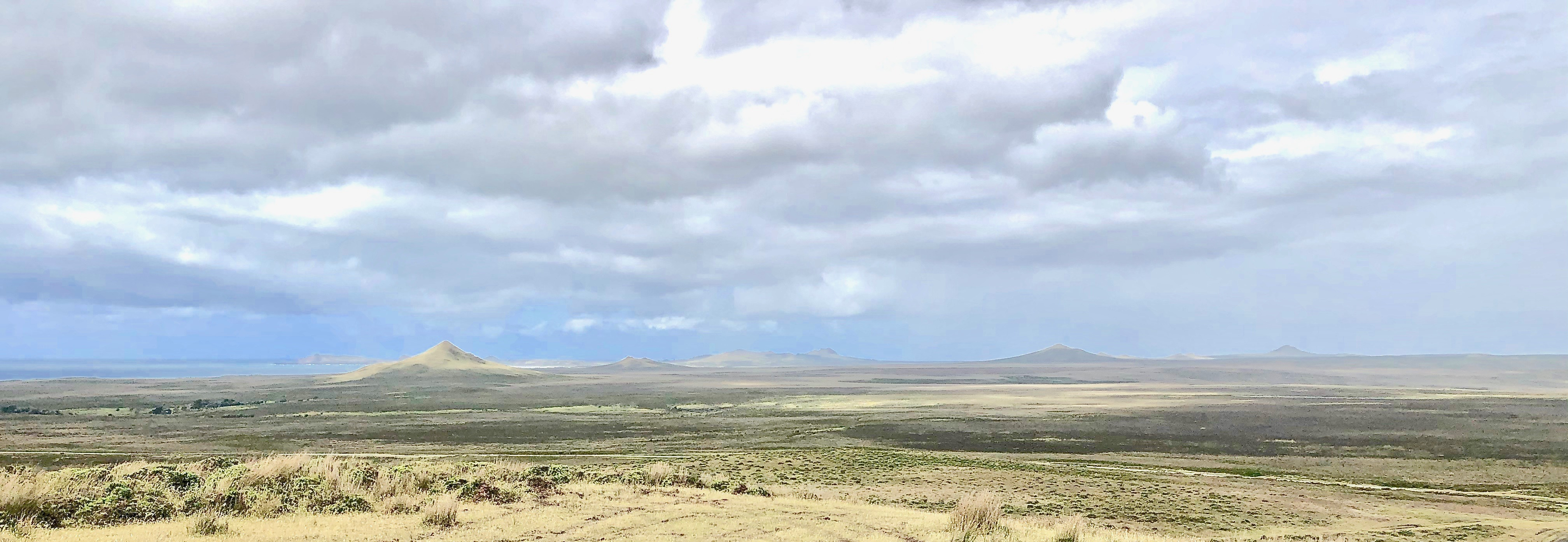
Volcanic plugs in north Chatham from 109m Tawirikoko to 99m Puhina, 134m Hemokawa, 151m Hokopoi, 125m Motuariki Hill, 149m Rangitihi, 188m Mt Chudleigh and 178m Korako.

Major lakes
Name	Alt.	Coords
Huro, Lake		43.9463°S 176.5115°W
Kaimoumi, Lake		43.7553°S 176.4010°W
Kaingarahu, Lake		43.8237°S 176.3773°W
Kairae, Lake		43.8554°S 176.4008°W
Koomutu, Lake		43.7501°S 176.4234°W
Long Pond		43.8794°S 176.4141°W
Makuku, Lake		43.8418°S 176.3908°W
Lake Marakapia		43.8427°S 176.5539°W
Matangirau, Lake	256	44.0790°S 176.5783°W
Omutu, Lake		43.7430°S 176.2479°W
Pakauwera Pond		43.7471°S 176.4883°W
Lake Pateriki		43.7532°S 176.3091°W
Pukawa, Lake		44.0679°S 176.5613°W
Rakeinui, Lake	244	44.0912°S 176.5839°W
Rangitahi Lake		43.7644°S 176.3460°W
Rotoeka, Lake		43.7760°S 176.5945°W
Rotokawau, Lake		43.7492°S 176.5878°W
Rotopararoa, Lake		43.8139°S 176.5915°W
Rotorua, Lake		43.7602°S 176.2918°W
Taia, Lake		43.8682°S 176.4053°W
Te Rangatapu	263	44.1082°S 176.5884°W
Te Roto		43.8204°S 176.5838°W
Lake Te Wapu		43.7421°S 176.2618°W
Tennants Lake		43.8266°S 176.5717°W
Tuku-a-taupo, Lake		44.0669°S 176.5256°W
Waikauia, Lake		43.7179°S 176.6233°W
Wharemanu, Lake		43.7533°S 176.4155°W
Wharo, Lake		43.7429°S 176.5045°W
unnamed lake 1		43.7919°S 176.3483°W
unnamed lake 2		43.7567°S 176.2475°W
unnamed lake 3		43.7263°S 176.5191°W
unnamed lake 4		43.8063°S 176.7226°W
unnamed lake 5		43.8063°S 176.8474°W

Some north and central peaks
Name	Alt.	Coords
Chudleigh, Mount	188	43.7239°S 176.5699°W
Diffenbach, Mount	134	43.7777°S 176.7033°W
Hokopoi	151	43.7772°S 176.6591°W
Korako	178	43.7720°S 176.5806°W
Matakitaki	155	43.8104°S 176.8334°W
Maunganui	178	43.7669°S 176.7740°W
Motoroporo	112	43.7716°S 176.6329°W
Motuariki	125	43.7393°S 176.6199°W
Puhina	99	43.6971°S 176.6278°W
Rangitihi	149	43.7211°S 176.5794°W
Tawirikoko	109	43.7988°S 176.7282°W

Some south peaks
Name	Alt.	Coords
Karore	282	44.1130°S 176.5523°W
Maungatere Hill	294	44.0525°S 176.5465°W
Oehau	205	44.0336°S 176.6353°W
Oropuke	287	44.0794°S 176.5099°W
Rangaika	264	44.0624°S 176.4563°W
Rangitane	225	44.0434°S 176.4559°W
Whakamarino	237	44.0232°S 176.6150°W
unnamed hill	299	44.1201°S 176.5773°W

== Demographics ==
Chatham Island has a land area of 725.72 km^{2} (280.20 sq mi).

Historical population
Year	Pop.	±% p.a.
2006	546	—
2013	555	+0.23%
2018	621	+2.27%
2023	570	−1.70%

Chatham Island had a population of 570 in the 2023 New Zealand census, a decrease of 51 people (−8.2%) since the 2018 census, and an increase of 15 people (2.7%) since the 2013 census. There were 285 males, 282 females, and 3 people of other genders in 252 dwellings. 2.1% of people identified as LGBTIQ+. There were 87 people (15.3%) aged under 15 years, 90 (15.8%) aged 15 to 29, 294 (51.6%) aged 30 to 64, and 99 (17.4%) aged 65 or older.

People could identify as more than one ethnicity. The results were 71.6% European (Pākehā); 68.4% Māori; 4.2% Pasifika; 2.1% Asian; 1.1% Middle Eastern, Latin American and African New Zealanders (MELAA); and 1.1% other, which includes people giving their ethnicity as "New Zealander". English was spoken by 97.4%, Māori by 11.6%, and other languages by 1.6%. No language could be spoken by 1.1% (e.g. too young to talk). New Zealand Sign Language was known by 0.5%. The percentage of people born overseas was 4.7, compared with 28.8% nationally.

Religious affiliations were 30.0% Christian, 0.5% Hindu, 0.5% Islam, 3.2% Māori religious beliefs, 0.5% Buddhist, 1.1% New Age, 0.5% Jewish, and 0.5% other religions. People who answered that they had no religion were 56.8%, and 7.9% of people did not answer the census question.

Of those at least 15 years old, 57 (11.8%) people had a bachelor's or higher degree, 276 (57.1%) had a post-high school certificate or diploma, and 150 (31.1%) people exclusively held high school qualifications. 63 people (13.0%) earned over $100,000 compared to 12.1% nationally. The employment status of those at least 15 was 294 (60.9%) full-time, 90 (18.6%) part-time, and 15 (3.1%) unemployed.

== Climate ==
Chatham Island has an oceanic climate (Koppen: Cfb) characterised by a narrow temperature range and relatively frequent rainfall. Its position far from any sizeable landmass renders the record high temperature for the main settlement (Waitangi) just 23.8 °C (74.8 °F). The climate is cool, wet and windy, with average high temperatures between 15 and 20 °C (59 and 68 °F) in summer, and between 5 and 10 °C (41 and 50 °F) in July (in the Southern Hemisphere winter). Snowfall is extremely rare, the fall recorded near sea level in July 2015 marking the first such reading for several decades. Under the Trewartha climate classification, Chatham Island has a humid subtropical climate (Cf) for the lack of cold weather during the winter and a daily mean temperature above 10 °C (50 °F) for eight months or more.

Climate data for Chatham Islands (1991–2020)
Month	Jan	Feb	Mar	Apr	May	Jun	Jul	Aug	Sep	Oct	Nov	Dec	Year
Mean daily maximum °C (°F)	19.2 (66.6)	19.4 (66.9)	18.2 (64.8)	16.1 (61.0)	14.0 (57.2)	12.0 (53.6)	11.3 (52.3)	12.0 (53.6)	13.2 (55.8)	14.5 (58.1)	16.0 (60.8)	17.8 (64.0)	15.3 (59.5)
Daily mean °C (°F)	15.7 (60.3)	16.1 (61.0)	15.0 (59.0)	13.1 (55.6)	11.1 (52.0)	9.3 (48.7)	8.4 (47.1)	9.0 (48.2)	10.1 (50.2)	11.1 (52.0)	12.5 (54.5)	14.4 (57.9)	12.2 (54.0)
Mean daily minimum °C (°F)	12.1 (53.8)	12.7 (54.9)	11.8 (53.2)	10.1 (50.2)	8.1 (46.6)	6.5 (43.7)	5.6 (42.1)	6.1 (43.0)	6.9 (44.4)	7.7 (45.9)	8.9 (48.0)	11.0 (51.8)	9.0 (48.2)
Average rainfall mm (inches)	49.2 (1.94)	64.0 (2.52)	75.7 (2.98)	79.0 (3.11)	88.3 (3.48)	93.7 (3.69)	72.3 (2.85)	71.0 (2.80)	71.3 (2.81)	56.2 (2.21)	53.5 (2.11)	62.9 (2.48)	837.1 (32.98)
Average rainy days (≥ 1.0 mm)	6.8	7.0	8.6	11.7	14.4	15.4	15.3	12.8	12.0	10.7	8.4	10.1	133.2
Average relative humidity (%)	75.5	77.9	80.6	81.4	84.6	86.1	86.0	82.9	79.6	77.3	76.0	76.2	80.3
Mean monthly sunshine hours	191.3	145.5	124.2	106.3	81.2	61.8	74.4	101.0	109.1	129.7	148.9	164.0	1,437.3
Source: NIWA Climate Data (sun 1981–2010)

== Flora and fauna ==
Chatham Island hosts the only known breeding population of the endemic and critically endangered magenta petrel or tāiko (Pterodroma magentae). The seabird was thought to be extinct until 1978, and had a population of under 200 in 2017.

== In popular culture ==
Chatham Island (or "Isle") is featured in the first and in the final chapter of Cloud Atlas, the 2004 novel by David Mitchell. The novel was adapted for screen in 2012.

== See also ==
- Chatham Standard Time Zone
- List of islands of New Zealand
