= Pattisson =

Pattisson is a surname. Notable people with the surname include:

- Hoël Pattisson (1905–1979), English cricketer
- John Robert Ebenezer Pattisson (1844–1928), Royal Navy officer
- Kenneth Pattisson (1916–2002), Royal Navy Fleet Air Arm pilot
- Rodney Pattisson, MBE (born 1943), British yachtsman
- Walter Pattisson (1854–1913), English amateur cricketer

== See also ==
- Cape Pattisson, headland in the northwest of Chatham Island, 800 km east of New Zealand's South Island
- Patterson (surname)
- Patteson
- Pattison (disambiguation)
