= Chatham Islands =

Remote New Zealand archipelago

Native name: Rēkohu (Moriori); Wharekauri (Māori)
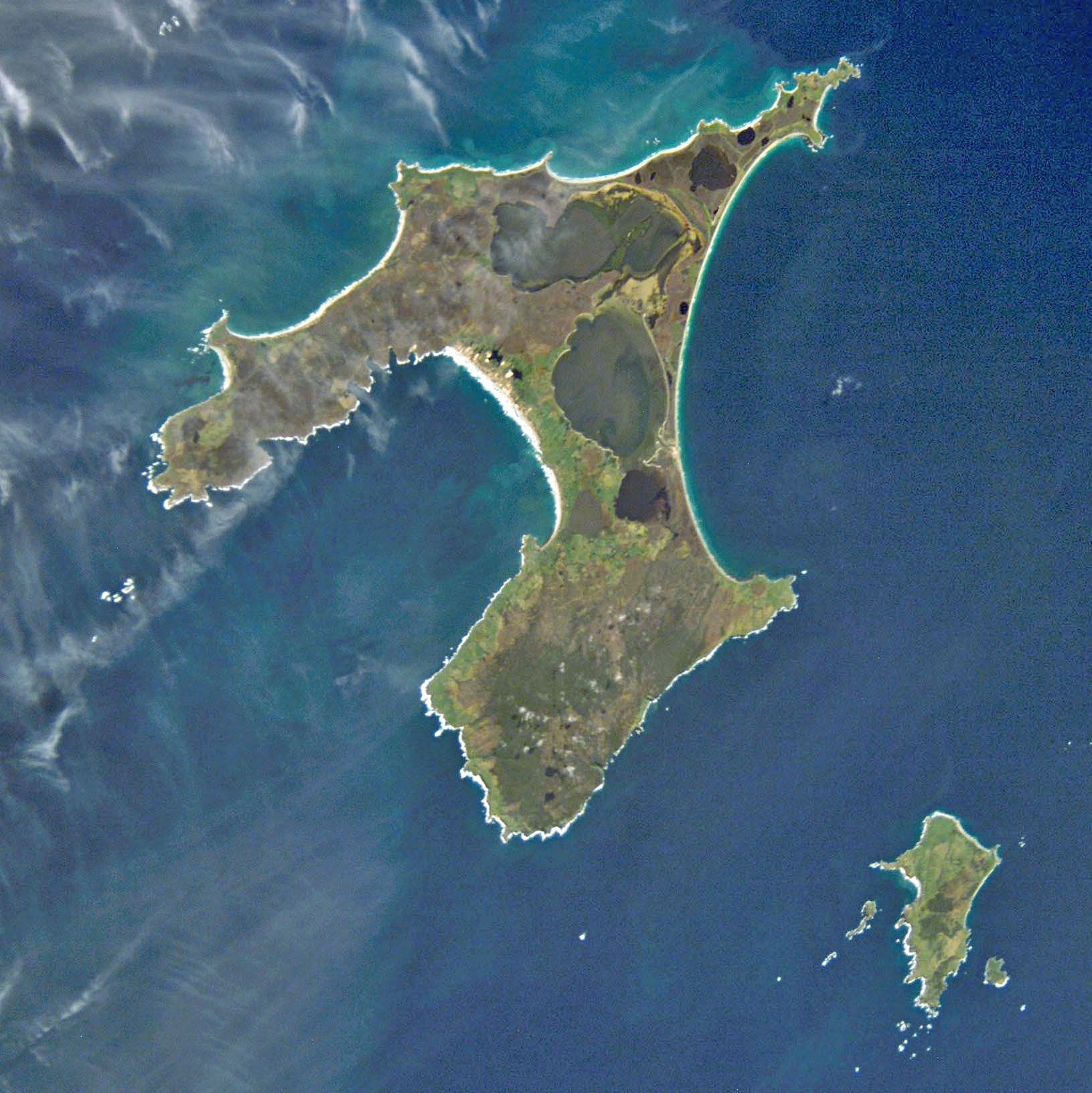
- The two largest islands are Chatham Island (top) and Pitt Island (bottom right)

- Location of the Chatham Islands

Geography
- Location: Southern Pacific Ocean
- Coordinates: 44.00°S 176.50°W
- Total islands: 10
- Major islands: Chatham Island; Pitt Island
- Area: 793.88 km^{2} (306.52 sq mi)
- Highest elevation: 299 m (981 ft)

Administration
- New Zealand
- Electorates: Wellington Bays; Te Tai Tonga (Māori)
- MPs: Julie Anne Genter (Green); Tākuta Ferris (Independent)
- Local government
- Territorial authority: Chatham Islands Council
- Largest settlement: Waitangi
- Mayor: Greg Horler
- Deputy mayor: Celine Gregory-Hunt

Demographics
- Demonym: Chatham Islanders
- Population: 620 (June 2025)

Additional information
- Time zone: CHAST (UTC+12:45)
  - Summer (DST): CHADT (UTC+13:45)
- Official website: cic.govt.nz

The Chatham Islands (/ˈtʃætəm/ CHAT-əm; Moriori: Rēkohu, lit. 'Misty Sun'; Māori: Wharekauri), officially the Chatham Islands Territory, are an archipelago in the Pacific Ocean about 800 km (430 nmi) east of New Zealand's South Island, administered as part of New Zealand, and consisting of about 10 islands within an approximate 60 km (30 nmi) radius, the largest of which are Chatham Island and Pitt Island (Rangiauria). They include New Zealand's easternmost point, the Forty-Fours. Some of the islands, formerly cleared for farming, are now preserved as nature reserves to conserve some of the unique flora and fauna.

The first human inhabitants of the Chatham Islands were the Moriori. They are descended from the Polynesians who settled New Zealand and from whom the Māori also descended. A group of the Polynesians migrated from mainland New Zealand to the Chatham Islands, probably in the 15th century.

In 1835, members of the Ngāti Mutunga and Ngāti Tama Māori iwi from the North Island invaded the islands and nearly exterminated the Moriori, enslaving the survivors. In 1863 the Moriori were officially released from slavery through a proclamation by the resident magistrate.

In the period of European colonisation, the New Zealand Company claimed that the British Crown had never included the Chatham Islands as being under its control, and proposed selling them to the Germans to be a German colony. In 1841, a contract was drawn up for the sale of the islands for £10,000 (equivalent to approximately £860,000 in 2023), but the sale fell through and the Chatham Islands officially became part of the Colony of New Zealand in 1842.

The Chatham Islands had a resident population of 620 in June 2025. Waitangi is the main port and settlement. The local economy depends largely on conservation, tourism, farming, and fishing. The Chatham Islands Council provides local administration – its powers resemble those of New Zealand's unitary authorities. The Chatham Islands have their own time zone, which is 45 minutes ahead of mainland New Zealand.

== History ==
=== Moriori ===
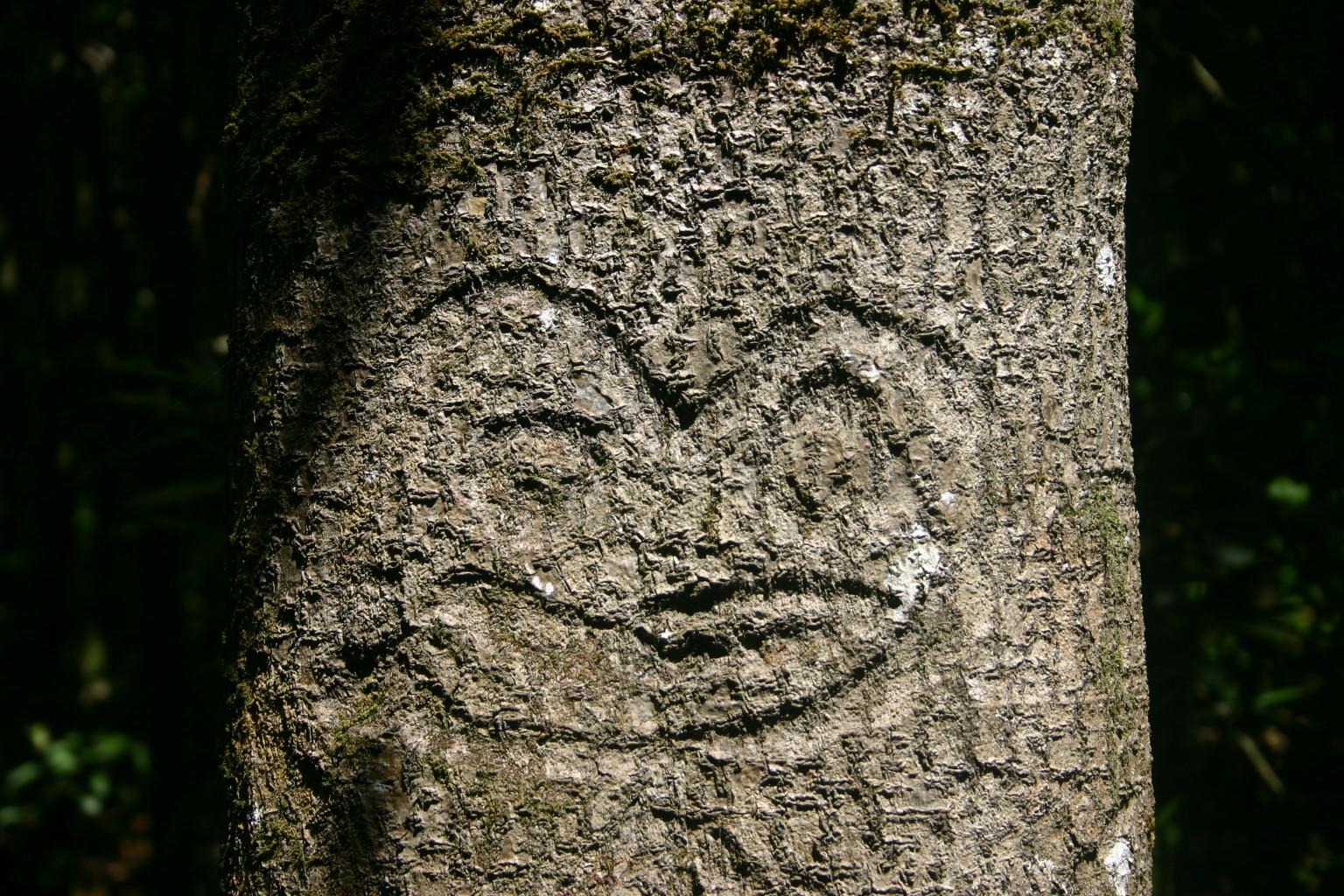
Moriori tree carving, or dendroglyph, in the Chatham Islands

The first human inhabitants of the Chatham Islands are the Moriori. They are descended from the East Polynesians who settled New Zealand and from whom the Māori also descended. A group of New Zealand Polynesians migrated from mainland New Zealand to the Chatham Islands, probably in the 15th century. Traditions of Moriori genealogy and some features of artefacts suggest that some arrivals may have come directly to the Chathams Islands from tropical East Polynesia. The Chathams are no further from Rarotonga than the Coromandel coast is, and it is possible that they were settled separately during the Polynesian exploration of the South Pacific, with most of the immigrants coming from New Zealand later. It is clear from artefacts and linguistic evidence that the final migration was from New Zealand.

The plants cultivated on mainland New Zealand were ill-suited for the colder Chathams, so the Moriori lived as hunter-gatherers and fishermen. While the islands lacked suitable trees for building ocean-going craft for long voyages, the Moriori invented the waka kōrari, a semi-submerged craft constructed of flax and lined with air bladders from kelp. This craft was used to travel to the outer islands on 'birding' missions. After generations of warfare, bloodshed was outlawed by the chief Nunuku-whenua and Moriori society became peaceful. Disputes were resolved by consensus or by duels in which, at the first sign of bloodshed, the fight was deemed over. The population before European contact was about 2,000.

Parts of a carved and decorated traditional ocean-going canoe (waka) were discovered in 2024 in a creek on the northern coast of the main island. Approximately 450 pieces, including rare examples of braided fibre lashed to timber, have been removed, catalogued and stored. Maui Solomon, chair of the Moriori Imi Settlement Trust, has no doubt that it is a "Moriori ancestral waka" that brought some of his ancestors to the islands hundreds of years ago. The question of ownership of the waka is before the Māori Land Court, with the Ministry for Culture and Heritage working with all stakeholders on "their future aspirations for the waka". The report He Waka Tipua, issued by an expert panel after visiting the site in April 2025, concluded that the waka was of pre-European construction and likely to originate in a period before there came to be significant cultural separation between New Zealand and inhabitants of the wider Pacific. However, more detailed conclusions about the exact age and size of the waka depend on the recovery of the 90–95 per cent that remains buried.

=== Early European arrival ===
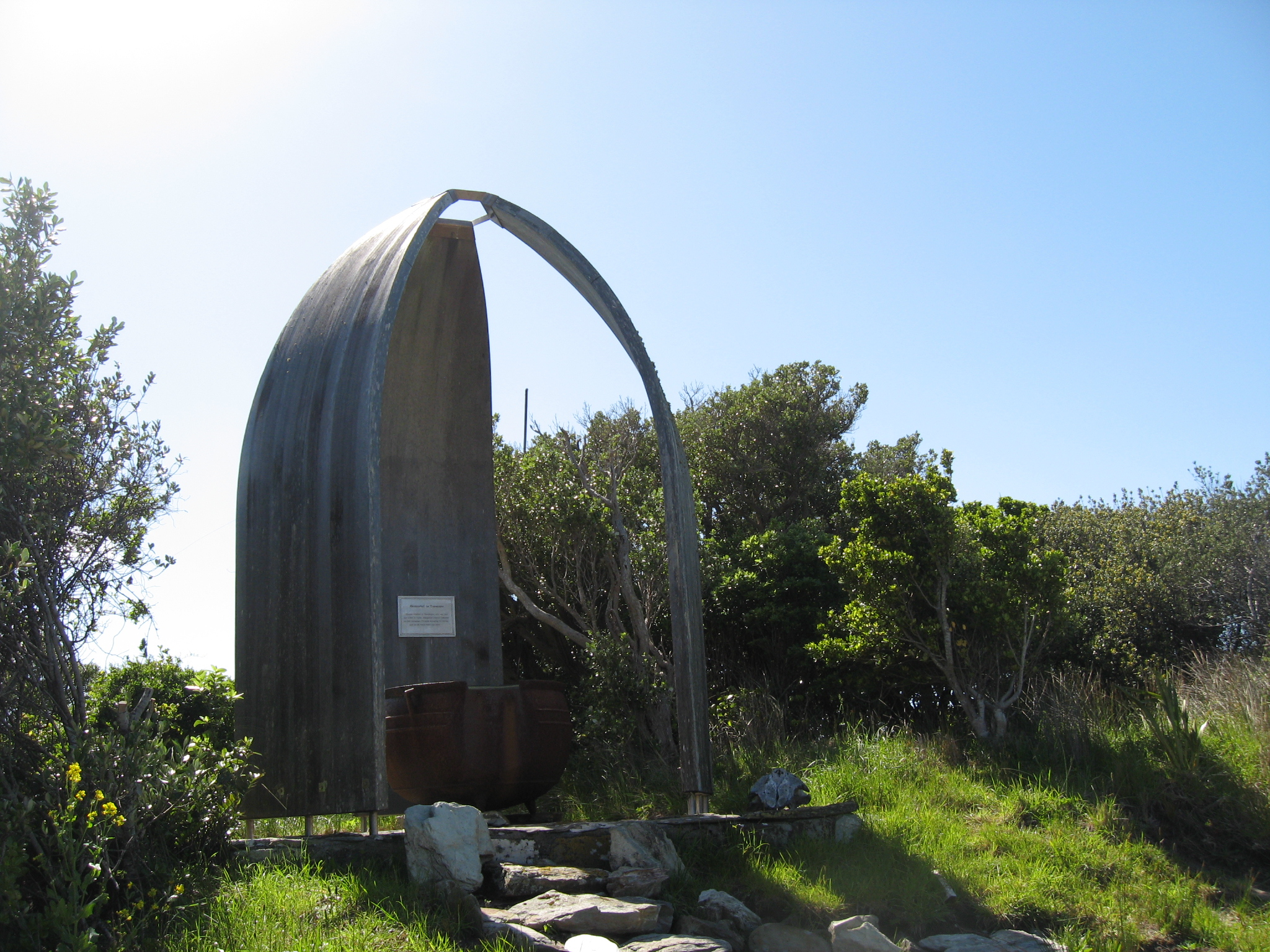
Monument to Torotoro above Kaingaroa Beach on Chatham Island

The name "Chatham Islands" comes from the name for the main island, which itself gets its name from John Pitt, 2nd Earl of Chatham, who was the First Lord of the Admiralty in 1791, when HMS Chatham reached the island. The ship, whose captain was William R. Broughton, was part of the Vancouver Expedition. The crew landed on the island on 29 November 1791 and claimed possession for Great Britain. Following a misunderstanding, Broughton's men shot and killed a Moriori resident of Kaingaroa, named Torotoro (or Tamakororo). Chatham Islands date their anniversary on 29 November, and observe it on the nearest Monday to 30 November.

Sealers and whalers soon started hunting in the surrounding ocean with the islands as their base. It is estimated that 10 to 20 per cent of the indigenous Moriori soon died from diseases introduced by foreigners. The sealing and whaling industries ceased activities about 1861, while fishing remained as a major economic activity.

=== Māori settlement in nineteenth century ===
On 19 November and 5 December 1835, about 900 Māori people from the iwi of Ngāti Mutunga and Ngāti Tama – men, women and children – previously resident in Te Whanganui-a-Tara (Wellington in mainland New Zealand) and led by the chief Pōmare Ngātata, arrived on the brig Lord Rodney. The group brought with them 78 tonnes of seed potatoes, 20 pigs and seven large waka.

The local Moriori received and initially cared for the incoming Māori. When it became clear that the visitors intended to stay, the Moriori withdrew to their marae at Te Awapatiki to meet and to debate what to do about the Māori settlers. The Moriori decided to keep with their policy of non-aggression. Soon, Ngāti Mutunga and Ngāti Tama began to takahi (walk the land) to lay claim to it.

Ngāti Mutunga and Ngāti Tama saw the Moriori meeting as a precursor to warfare on the part of Moriori and decided to act against them. The Māori attacked: in the ensuing violence more than 260 Moriori were killed. A Moriori survivor recalled: "[The Māori] commenced to kill us like sheep... [We] were terrified, fled to the bush, concealed ourselves in holes underground, and in any place to escape our enemies. It was of no avail; we were discovered and killed—men, women and children—indiscriminately". A Māori chief, Te Rakatau Katihe, said in the Native Land Court in 1870: "We took possession ... in accordance with our custom, and we caught all the people. Not one escaped. Some ran away from us, these we killed; and others also we killed – but what of that? It was in accordance with our custom. I am not aware of any of our people being killed by them."

After the killings, Moriori were forbidden to marry Moriori, or to have children with each other. Māori kept Moriori slaves until 1863, when slavery was abolished by proclamation of the resident magistrate. Many Moriori women had children by their Māori masters. A number of Moriori women eventually married either Māori or European men. Some were taken away from the Chathams and never returned. Ernst Dieffenbach, who visited the Chathams on a New Zealand Company ship in 1840, reported that the Moriori were the virtual slaves of Māori and were severely mistreated, with death being a blessing. By the time the slaves were released in 1863, only 160 Moriori remained, hardly 10% of the 1835 population.

=== Further European arrivals ===
In early May 1838 (some reports say 1839, but this is contradicted by ship records) the French whaling vessel Jean Bart anchored off Waitangi to trade with the Māori. The number of Māori boarding frightened the French, escalating into a confrontation in which the French crew were killed and the Jean Bart was run aground at Ocean Bay, to be ransacked and burned by Ngāti Mutunga. When word of the incident reached the French naval corvette Heroine in the Bay of Islands in September 1838, it set sail for the Chathams, accompanied by the whalers Adele and Rebecca Sims. The French arrived on 13 October and, after unsuccessfully attempting to entice some Ngāti Tama aboard, proceeded to bombard Waitangi. The next morning about a hundred armed Frenchmen went ashore, burning buildings, destroying waka, and seizing pigs and potatoes. The attacks mostly affected Ngāti Tama, weakening their position relative to Ngāti Mutunga.

In 1840, Ngāti Mutunga decided to attack Ngāti Tama at their pā. They built a high staging next to the pā so they could fire down on their former allies. Fighting was still in progress when the New Zealand Company ship Cuba arrived as part of a scheme to buy land for settlement. The Treaty of Waitangi, at that stage, did not apply to the islands. The company negotiated a truce between the two warring tribes. In 1841, the New Zealand Company had proposed to establish a German colony on the Chathams. The proposal was discussed by the directors, and the secretary of the company John Ward signed an agreement with Karl Sieveking of Hamburg on 12 September 1841. The price was set at £10,000. However, when the British Colonial Office stated that the islands were to be part of the Colony of New Zealand and any Germans settling there would be treated as aliens, Joseph Somes claimed that Ward had been acting on his own initiative. The proposed leader John Beit and the expedition went to Nelson instead.

The company was then able to acquire large areas of land at Port Hutt (which the Māori called Whangaroa) and Waitangi from Ngāti Mutunga and also large areas of land from Ngāti Tama. This did not stop Ngāti Mutunga from trying to get revenge upon Ngāti Tama for the earlier death of one of their chiefs. They were satisfied after they killed the brother of a Ngāti Tama chief. The tribes agreed to an uneasy peace, which was formally confirmed in 1842.

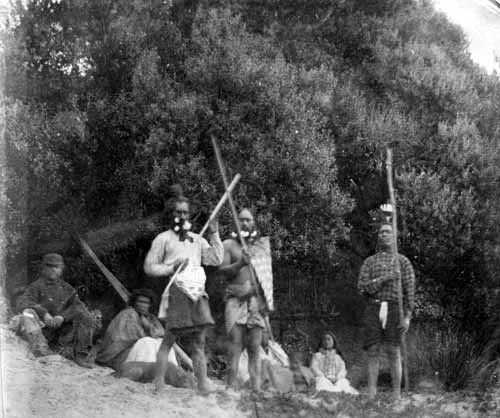
Moriori people in the late 19th century

Reluctant to give up slavery, Matioro and his people chartered a brig in late 1842 and sailed to Auckland Island. While Matioro was surveying the island, two of the chiefs who had accompanied him decided the island was too inhospitable for settlement, and set sail before he had returned, stranding him and his 50 followers. Pākehā settlers arrived in 1849 and Matioro and most of his people moved to Stewart Island in 1854.

An all-male group of German Lutheran missionaries arrived in 1843. When a group of women were sent out to join them three years later, several marriages ensued; a few members of the present-day population can trace their ancestry back to those missionary families.

In 1865, the Māori leader Te Kooti was exiled on the Chatham Islands along with a large group of Māori rebels called the Hauhau, followers of Pai Mārire who had murdered missionaries and fought against government forces mainly on the East Coast of the North Island of New Zealand. The rebel prisoners were paid one shilling a day to work on sheep farms owned by the few European settlers. Sometimes they worked on road and track improvements. They were initially guarded by 26 guards, half of whom were Māori. They lived in whare along with their families. The prisoners helped build a redoubt of stone surrounded by a ditch and wall. Later, they built three stone prison cells. In 1868 Te Kooti and the other prisoners commandeered a schooner and escaped back to the North Island.

Almost all the Māori returned to Taranaki in the 1860s, some after a tsunami in 1868. In 1868 Percy Smith undertook the first detailed survey of the Chatham Islands. As well as laying out block boundaries he added "paper roads".

=== 1880s to today ===
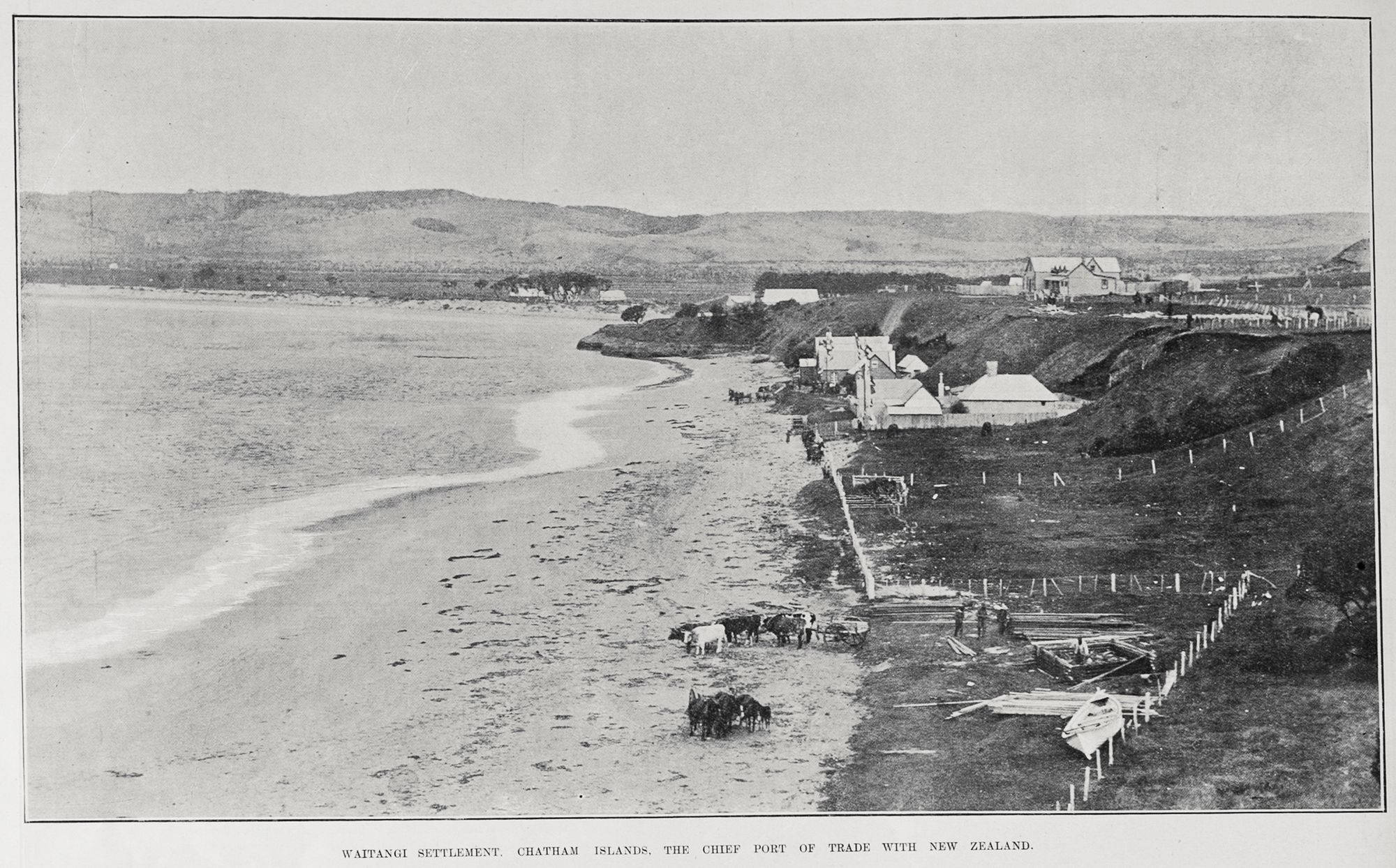
Waitangi settlement – 1907

The economy of the Chatham Islands, then dominated by the export of wool, suffered under the international depression of the 1880s, only rebounding with the building of fish freezing plants at the island villages of Owenga and Kaingaroa in 1910. Construction of the first wharf at Waitangi began in 1931 with completion in 1934. On 25 November 1940, during the Second World War, the German auxiliary cruisers Komet and Orion captured and then sank the Chatham Islands supply ship the Holmwood, so the wharf saw little use by ships. A flying-boat facility was built at Te Whanga Lagoon soon after; a flying boat service to and from the Chathams continued till 1966 when it was replaced with conventional aircraft.

After the Second World War, the island economy suffered again from its isolation and government subsidies became necessary. This led to many young Chatham Islanders leaving for the mainland. There was a brief crayfish boom, which helped stabilise the economy in the late 1960s and early 1970s. From the early 2000s cattle became a major component of the local economy.

=== Moriori community ===
The Moriori community is organised as the Hokotehi Moriori Trust. The Moriori have received recognition from the Crown and the New Zealand government and some of their claims against those institutions for the generations of neglect and oppression have been accepted and acted on. Moriori are recognised as the original people of Rekohu. The Crown also recognised the Ngāti Mutunga Māori as having indigenous status in the Chathams by right of around 160 years of occupation.

The total population of the islands is around 600, including members of both ethnic groups. In January 2005, the Moriori celebrated the opening of the new Kopinga Marae (meeting house).

Modern descendants of the 1835 Māori conquerors claimed a share in ancestral Māori fishing rights. This claim was granted. Now that the primordial population, the Moriori, have been recognised to be former Māori—over the objections of some of the Ngāti Mutunga—they too share in the ancestral Māori fishing rights. Both groups have been granted fishing quotas.

== Geography ==
Topographic map of the Chatham Islands

The Chatham Islands lie roughly 840 km (455 nmi) east of Christchurch in the South Island. The nearest New Zealand mainland point to the islands is Cape Turnagain, in the North Island, 650 km (350 nmi) distant. The islands sit on the Chatham Rise, a large, relatively shallowly submerged (no more than 1,000 m or 3,281 ft deep at any point) plateau that stretches east from near the South Island. The Chatham Rise is part of the now largely submerged continent of Zealandia. The islands, which emerged only within the last 4 million years, are the only part of the Chatham Rise showing above sea level.

The two largest islands, Chatham Island and Pitt Island (Rangiaotea), constitute most of the total area of 793.87 km^{2} (307 sq mi), with 12 scattered islets making up the rest. The islands are hilly, with the coastal areas being a mix of cliffs, dunes, beaches, and lagoons. Pitt is more rugged than Chatham.

The highest point (299 m (981 ft)) is on a plateau near the southernmost tip of Chatham Island, 1.5 km (7/8 mi) south of Lake Te Rangatapu. The plateau is dotted with numerous lakes and lagoons, flowing mainly from the island's nearby second-highest point, Maungatere Hill, at 294 m (965 ft). Notable are the large Te Whanga Lagoon, and Huro and Rangitahi. Chatham has a number of streams, including Te Awainanga and Tuku.

Chatham and Pitt are the only inhabited islands; the other islands are conservation reserves with restricted or prohibited access.

The main islands, in order of occupation, are:

English name	Moriori name	Māori name	Remarks
Chatham Island	Rēkohu	Wharekauri	
Pitt Island	Rangiaotea	Rangiauria	
South East Island	Hokorereoro	Rangatira	
The Fort	Maung’ Rē	Māngere	The Māori name has supplanted the English name for this island.
Little Mangere	Unknown	Tapuaenuku	
Star Keys	Motchu Hopo	Motuhope	
The Sisters	Rakitchu	Rangitatahi	about 16 km (8 1/2 nmi) north of Cape Pattison, a headland in the northwestern part of Chatham Island
Forty-Fours	Motchu Hara	Motuhara	the easternmost point of New Zealand, about 50 km (25 nmi) from Chatham Island.

The International Date Line lies to the east of the Chathams, even though the islands lie east of 180° longitude. The Chathams observe their own time, which is 45 minutes ahead of New Zealand time, including during periods of daylight-saving time; the Chatham Standard Time Zone is distinctive as one of very few that differ from others by a period other than a whole hour or half-hour. (New Zealand Time orients itself to 180° longitude.)

=== Geology ===
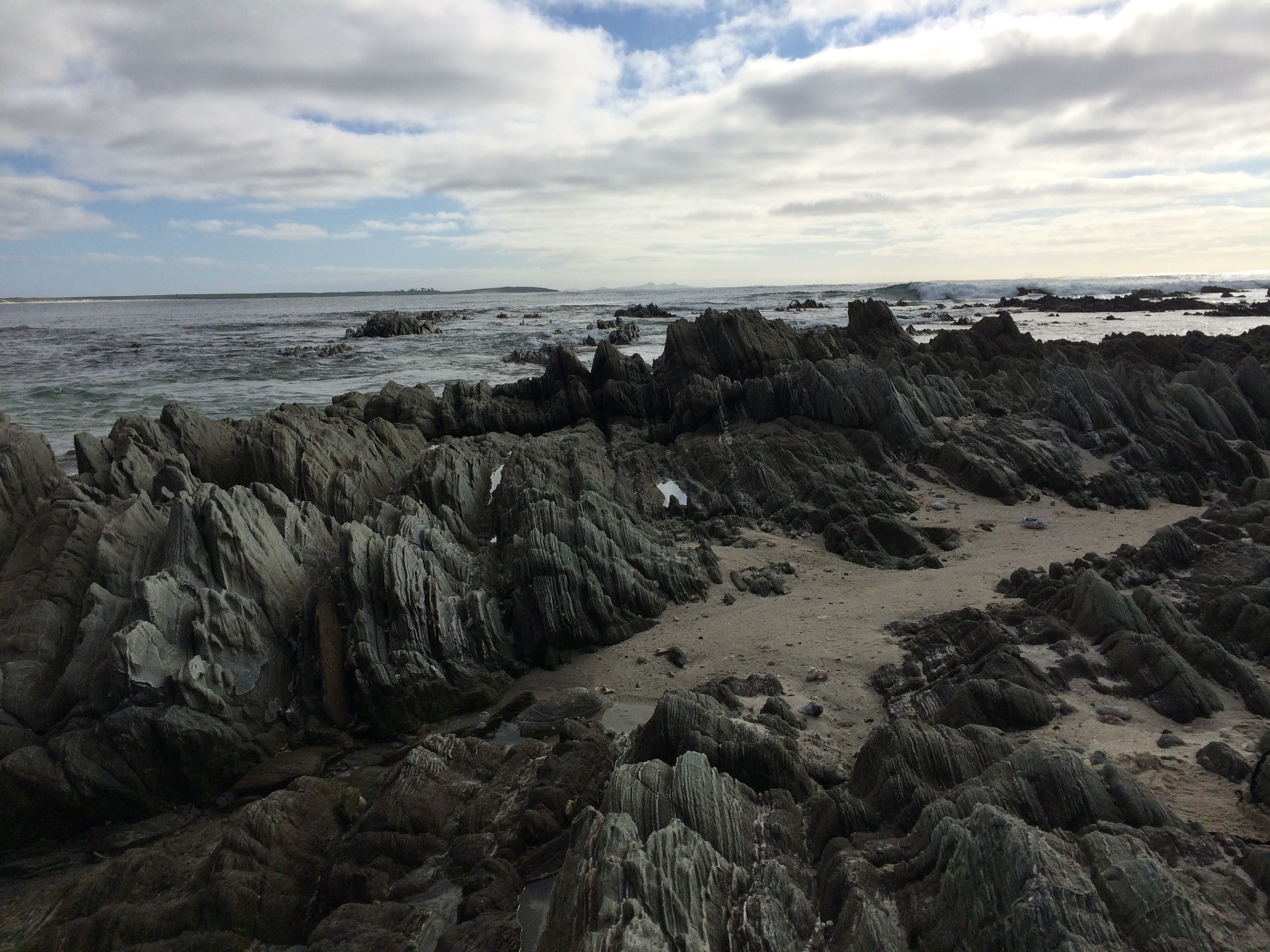
Schist rocks, Kaingaroa beach

The Chatham Islands are far from the Australian-Pacific plate boundary that dominates the geology of mainland New Zealand. The islands' stratigraphy consists of a Mesozoic schist basement, typically covered by marine sedimentary rocks. Both these sequences are intruded by a series of basalt eruptions. Volcanic activity has occurred multiple times since the Cretaceous, but currently there is no active volcanism near any part of the Chatham Rise. Prominent columnar basalt can be seen at Ohira Bay (one of the indentations in the north coast of Petre Bay) between Te Roto and Port Hutt.

=== Climate ===
The Chatham Islands have an oceanic climate (Köppen climate classification: Cfb) characterised by a narrow temperature range and relatively frequent rainfall. Their isolated position far from any sizeable landmass renders the record high temperature for the main settlement (Waitangi) just 23.8 °C (74.8 °F). The climate is cool, wet and windy, with average high temperatures between 16 and 20 °C (61 and 68 °F) in summer, and typically around 11°C in July (in the Southern Hemisphere winter). Snowfall is extremely rare, the fall recorded near sea level in July 2015 marking the first such reading for several decades. Under the Trewartha climate classification, the Chatham Islands have a humid subtropical climate (Cf) for the lack of cold weather during the winter and a daily mean temperature above 10 °C (50 °F) for 8 months or more.

Climate data for Chatham Islands (1991–2020)
Month	Jan	Feb	Mar	Apr	May	Jun	Jul	Aug	Sep	Oct	Nov	Dec	Year
Mean daily maximum °C (°F)	19.2 (66.6)	19.4 (66.9)	18.2 (64.8)	16.1 (61.0)	14.0 (57.2)	12.0 (53.6)	11.3 (52.3)	12.0 (53.6)	13.2 (55.8)	14.5 (58.1)	16.0 (60.8)	17.8 (64.0)	15.3 (59.5)
Daily mean °C (°F)	15.7 (60.3)	16.1 (61.0)	15.0 (59.0)	13.1 (55.6)	11.1 (52.0)	9.3 (48.7)	8.4 (47.1)	9.0 (48.2)	10.1 (50.2)	11.1 (52.0)	12.5 (54.5)	14.4 (57.9)	12.2 (54.0)
Mean daily minimum °C (°F)	12.1 (53.8)	12.7 (54.9)	11.8 (53.2)	10.1 (50.2)	8.1 (46.6)	6.5 (43.7)	5.6 (42.1)	6.1 (43.0)	6.9 (44.4)	7.7 (45.9)	8.9 (48.0)	11.0 (51.8)	9.0 (48.2)
Average rainfall mm (inches)	49.2 (1.94)	64.0 (2.52)	75.7 (2.98)	79.0 (3.11)	88.3 (3.48)	93.7 (3.69)	72.3 (2.85)	71.0 (2.80)	71.3 (2.81)	56.2 (2.21)	53.5 (2.11)	62.9 (2.48)	837.1 (32.98)
Average rainy days (≥ 1.0 mm)	6.8	7.0	8.6	11.7	14.4	15.4	15.3	12.8	12.0	10.7	8.4	10.1	133.2
Average relative humidity (%)	75.5	77.9	80.6	81.4	84.6	86.1	86.0	82.9	79.6	77.3	76.0	76.2	80.3
Mean monthly sunshine hours	191.3	145.5	124.2	106.3	81.2	61.8	74.4	101.0	109.1	129.7	148.9	164.0	1,437.3
Source 1: NIWA (for 1991–2020)
Source 2: NIWA (for sunshine hours, which are for 1981–2010)

=== Biodiversity ===
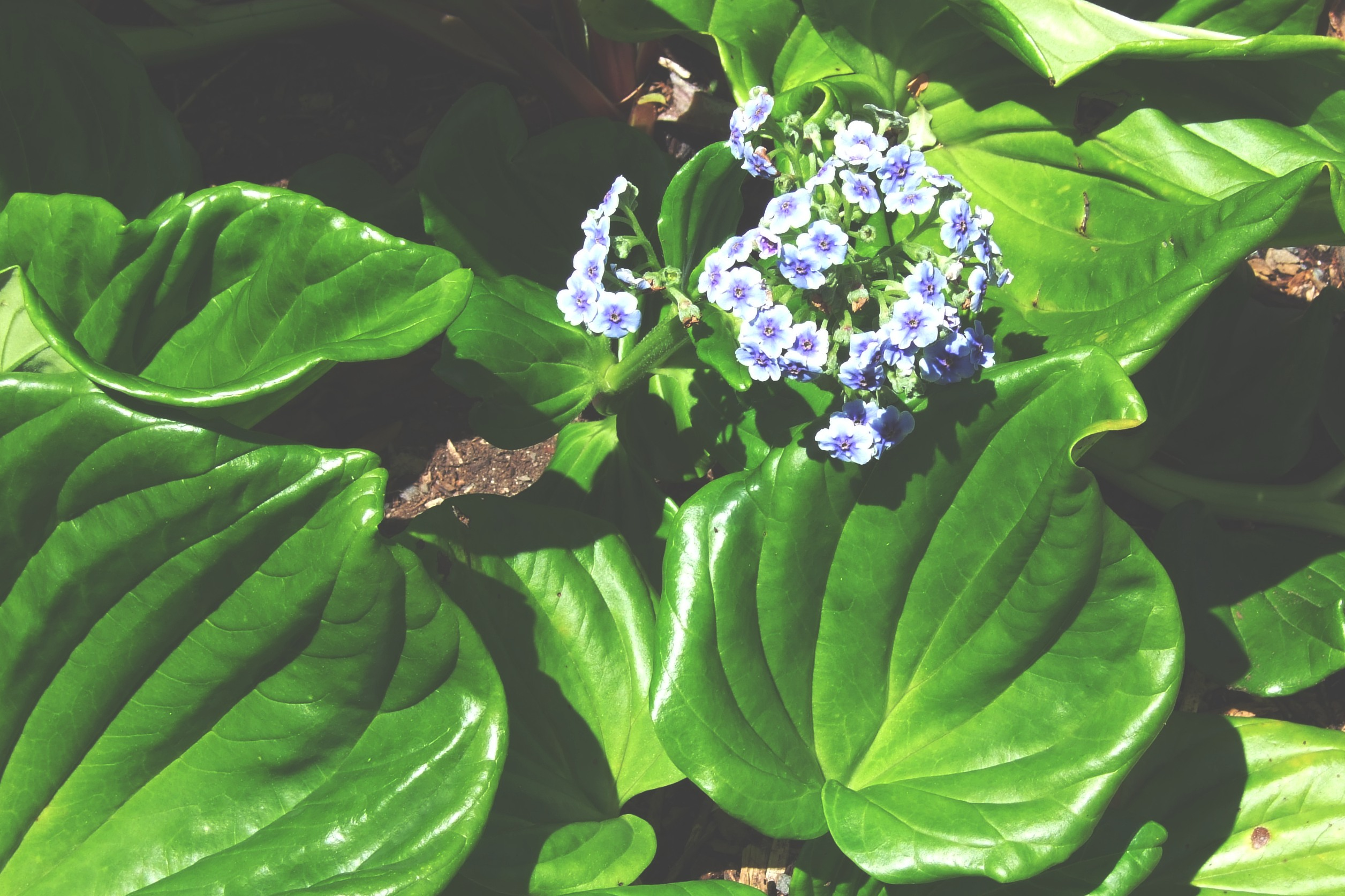
Chatham Islands forget-me-not (Myosotidium hortensia)

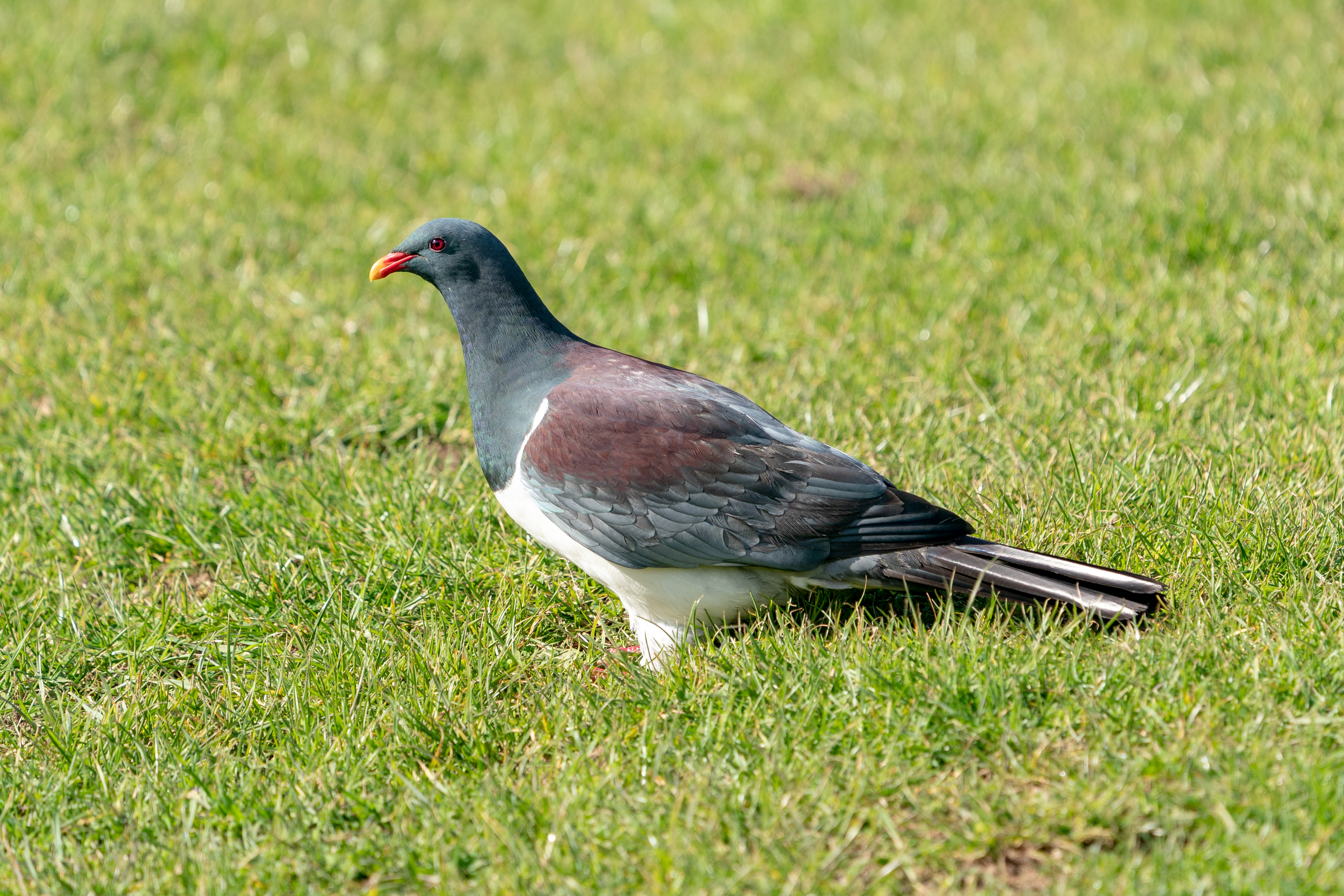
A Chatham pigeon foraging in pasture in Awatotara Parea Reserve

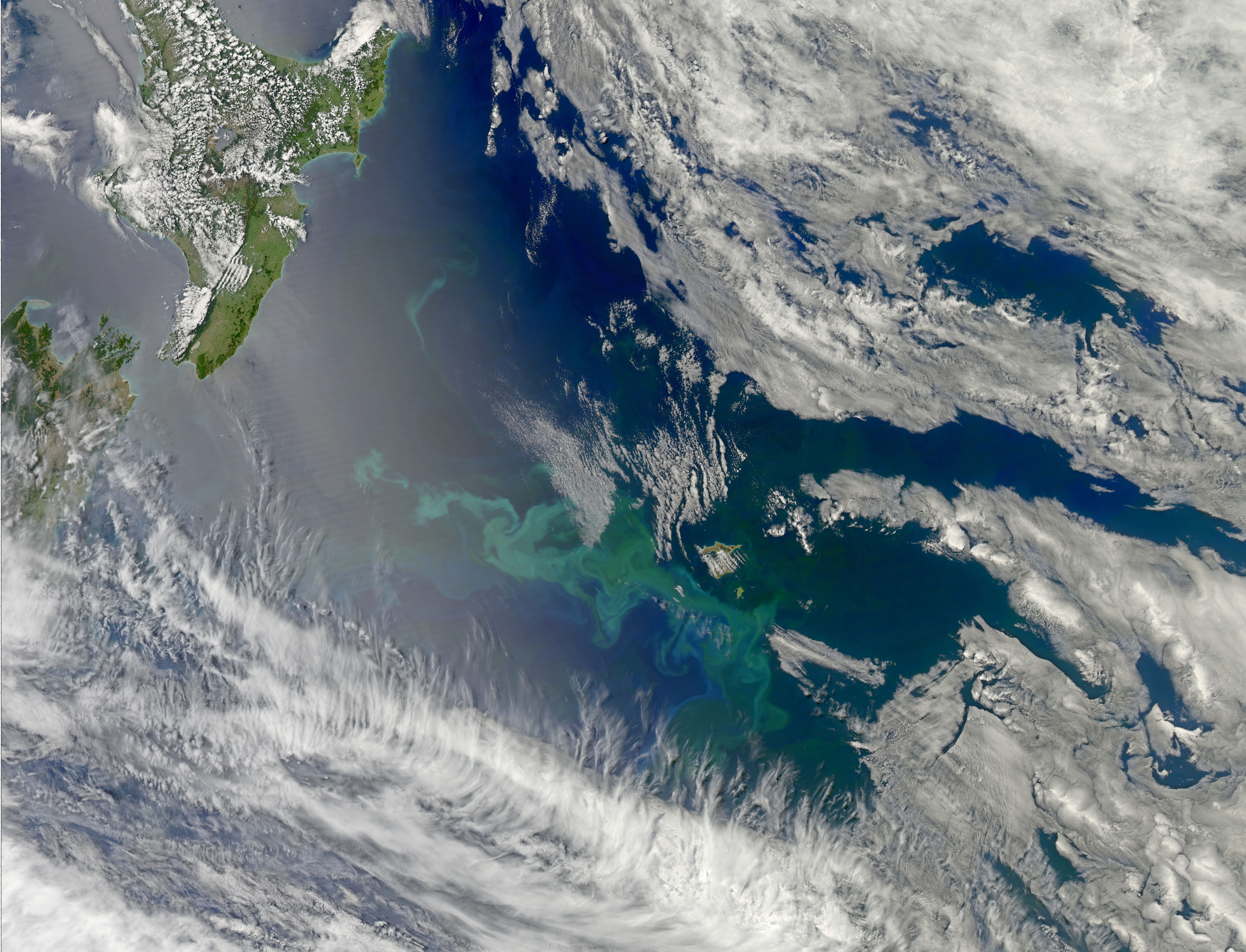
Massive phytoplankton bloom around the islands

==== Plants ====
The natural vegetation of the islands was a mixture of forest, scrubby heath, and swamp, but today most of the land is fern or pasture-covered, although there are some areas of dense forest and areas of peat bogs and other habitats. Of interest are the akeake trees, with branches trailing almost horizontally in the lee of the wind. The ferns in the forest understory include Blechnum discolor.

The islands are home to a rich bio-diversity including about 50 endemic plants adapted to the cold and the wind, such as the Chatham Islands forget-me-not (Myosotidium hortensia), the Chatham Islands sow-thistle (Embergeria grandifolia), rautini (Brachyglottis huntii), the Chatham Islands kakaha (Astelia chathamica), soft speargrass (Aciphylla dieffenbachii), and the Chatham Island akeake or Chatham Island tree daisy (Olearia traversiorum).

==== Birds ====
The islands are a breeding ground for huge flocks of seabirds and are home to a number of endemic birds, some of which are seabirds and others which live on the islands. The best known species are the critically endangered magenta petrel and the vulnerable black robin, both of which came perilously close to extinction before drawing the attention of conservation efforts. Other endemic species are the Chatham oystercatcher, the Chatham gerygone, the Chatham pigeon, Forbes' parakeet, the Chatham snipe and the shore plover. The endemic Chatham shag (critically endangered), the Pitt shag (endangered) and the Chatham albatross (vulnerable) are at risk of capture by a variety of fishing gear, including fishing lines, trawls, gillnets, and pots.

A number of species have gone extinct since human settlement, including the Chatham raven, Chatham fernbird, Chatham Islands penguin, Rēkohu shelduck and the three endemic species of flightless rails, the Chatham rail, Dieffenbach's rail, and Hawkins's rail.

==== Mammals ====
Marine mammals found in the waters of the Chathams include New Zealand sea lions, New Zealand fur seals, leopard seals, and southern elephant seals. Many whale species are attracted to the rich food sources of the Chatham Rise.

==== Dragonflies and damselflies ====
Only three species of Odonata are known from the Chatham Islands, while 14 have been recorded throughout New Zealand.

- Zygoptera Selys, 1854
  1. Lestidae Calvert, 1901
    1. Austrolestes colensonis (White in White & Gardiner Butler, 1846)
  2. Coenagrionidae Kirby, 1890
    1. Xanthocnemis tuanuii Rowe, 1981
- Anisoptera Selys, 1854
  1. Corduliidae Kirby, 1890
    1. Procordulia smithii (White in White & Gardiner Butler, 1846)

According to Marinov & McHugh (2010), the poor diversity is linked to harsh environmental conditions, such as generally low annual temperatures, constant strong winds and high acidity in the habitats where their larvae develop.

Xanthocnemis tuanuii is endemic to the Chatham Islands, but close to Xanthocnemis zealandica (McLachlan, 1873) from mainland New Zealand and genetic studies suggest that the two species cohabitate on the Chatham Islands Nolan & al (2007).

According to Marinov & McHugh (2010), the Chatham Island population of Austrolestes colensonis differs genetically from the populations on New Zealand’s main islands, but the differences seem too weak to separate them into two species.

==== Threats ====
Much of the natural forest of the islands has been cleared for farming. Introduced species that prey on the indigenous birds and reptiles are a threat. On Mangere and Rangatira Islands, which are now preserved as nature reserves to conserve some of the unique flora and fauna, livestock has been removed and native wildlife is recovering.

Most lakes have been affected by agricultural run-off, but water quality has improved and river quality is generally classed as 'A'.

In February 2025, the Department of Conservation (DOC) announced a pest eradication project on the island. The project, part of the Island-Ocean Connection Challenge (IOCC), targets three islands up to 15 times larger than any previously cleared of pests in New Zealand. The goal is to remove invasive species, restore ecosystems, and protect native wildlife, including kākāpō, seabirds, and rare plants. The total project cost is estimated at $202 million, with $54 million from the government and $11.5 million raised through philanthropy, leaving $137 million still needed.

== Population ==
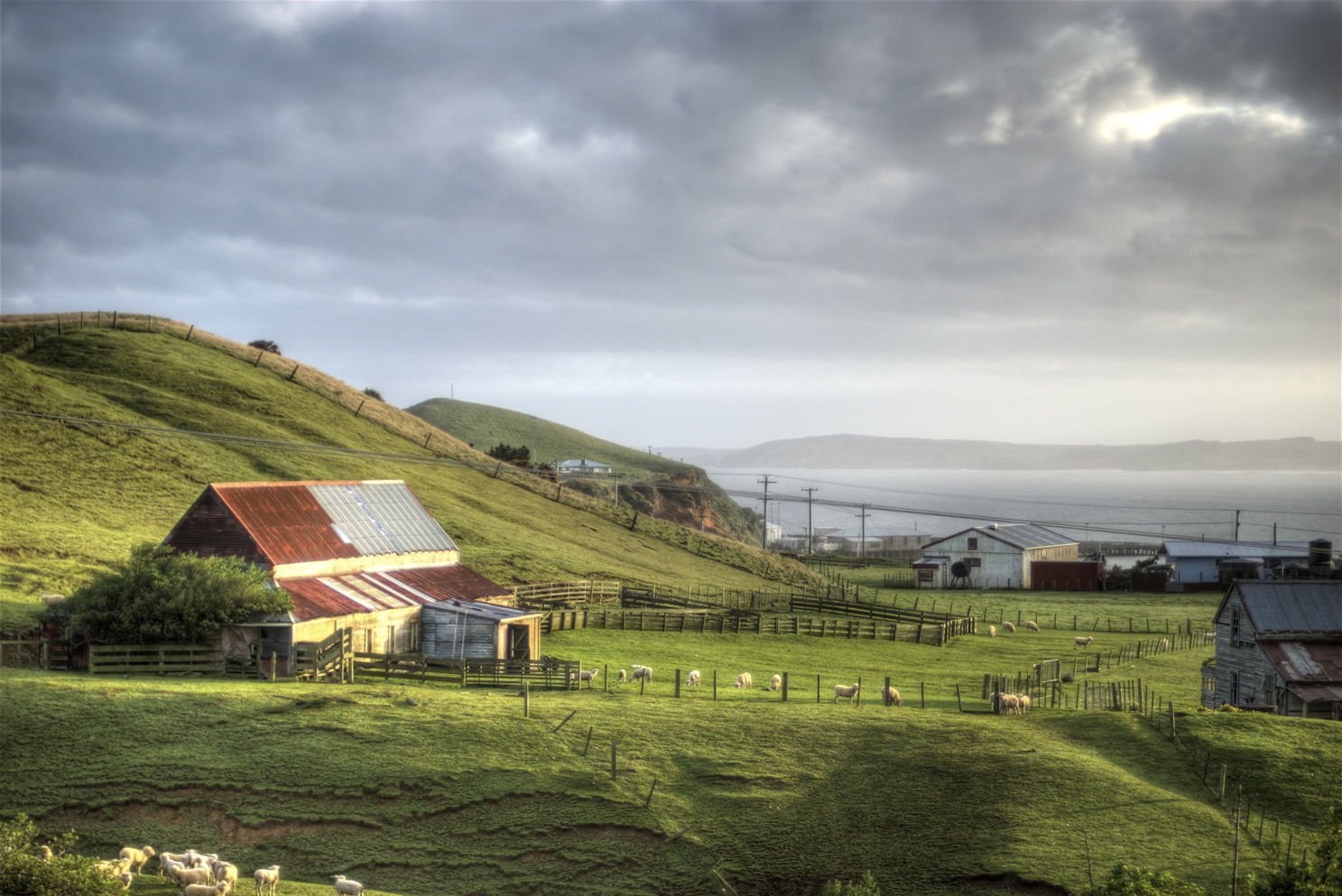
An agricultural scene at Waitangi

Chatham Islands covers 793.88 km^{2} (306.52 sq mi) and had an estimated population of 620 as of June 2025, with a population density of 0.8 people per km^{2}.

Historical population
Year	Pop.	±% p.a.
1986	775	—
1991	760	−0.39%
1996	739	−0.56%
2001	717	−0.60%
2006	609	−3.21%
2013	600	−0.21%
2018	663	+2.02%
2023	612	−1.59%

Ethnicities, 2023 Census
Ethnicity	Population
New Zealand European	444
Māori	420
Pasifika	24
Asian	12
MELAA	6
Other	9

Chatham Islands had a population of 612 in the 2023 New Zealand census, a decrease of 51 people (−7.7%) since the 2018 census, and an increase of 12 people (2.0%) since the 2013 census. There were 315 males, 294 females, and 3 people of other genders in 267 dwellings. 2.5% of people identified as LGBTIQ+. The median age was 44.0 years (compared with 38.1 years nationally). There were 99 people (16.2%) aged under 15 years, 96 (15.7%) aged 15 to 29, 321 (52.5%) aged 30 to 64, and 99 (16.2%) aged 65 or older.

People could identify as more than one ethnicity. The results were 72.5% European (Pākehā); 68.6% Māori; 3.9% Pasifika; 2.0% Asian; 1.0% Middle Eastern, Latin American and African New Zealanders (MELAA); and 2.9% other, which includes people giving their ethnicity as "New Zealander". English was spoken by 98.0%, Māori by 11.3%, and other languages by 1.5%. No language could be spoken by 1.5% (e.g. too young to talk). New Zealand Sign Language was known by 0.5%. The percentage of people born overseas was 4.4, compared with 28.8% nationally.

Religious affiliations were 29.9% Christian, 0.5% Hindu, 0.5% Islam, 2.9% Māori religious beliefs, 0.5% Buddhist, 1.0% New Age, 0.5% Jewish, and 1.0% other religions. People who answered that they had no religion were 56.4%, and 7.8% of people did not answer the census question.

Of those at least 15 years old, 54 (10.5%) people had a bachelor's or higher degree, 300 (58.5%) had a post-high school certificate or diploma, and 159 (31.0%) people exclusively held high school qualifications. The median income was $46,600, compared with $41,500 nationally. 63 people (12.3%) earned over $100,000 compared to 12.1% nationally. The employment status of those at least 15 was 306 (59.6%) full-time, 99 (19.3%) part-time, and 15 (2.9%) unemployed.

Most residents live on Chatham Island, with only a few dozen on Pitt Island. The main settlement is the town of Waitangi, centrally located on the west coast, with 140 residents as of June 2025. Its facilities include a hospital with resident doctor, bank, several stores, engineering and marine services, and the main shipping wharf. Other villages include Te One, near Waitangi, Ōwenga in the south-east, Kaingaroa in the north-east, and Port Hutt in the north-west.

== Government ==
=== Local government ===
For local government purposes, the Chatham Islands and the adjoining sea is known as the Chatham Islands Territory and is administered by the Chatham Islands Council, which was established by the Chatham Islands Council Act 1995 (Statute No 041, Commenced: 1 November 1995). These succeeded, respectively, the Chatham Islands County, which was established in 1901, and the Chatham Islands County Council, which was established in 1926. The Council is a territorial authority that has many of the functions, duties and powers of a district council and of a regional council, making it in effect a unitary authority with slightly fewer responsibilities than other unitary authorities. The Council comprises a directly-elected mayor and eight councillors, one of whom is also deputy mayor. Since 2004, with funding from central government, Environment Canterbury (the Canterbury Regional Council) has carried out some regional council functions on the council's behalf.

In the 2010 local government elections, Chatham Islands had New Zealand's highest rate of returned votes, with 71.3 per cent voting.

=== Parliamentary electorates ===
The Chatham Islands are within a single electorate which sends one member to Parliament. Until the 1990s, the Chatham Islands were in the Lyttelton electorate, but since then they have formed part of the Rongotai general electorate, which otherwise lies in south Wellington. Julie Anne Genter is the MP for Rongotai. The Te Tai Tonga Māori electorate (currently held by Tākuta Ferris) includes the Chatham Islands; before boundaries of Māori seats were reformed in 1996 the archipelago was part of the Māori electorate of Western Māori.

=== State services ===
Policing is carried out by a sole-charge constable appointed by the Wellington police district, who has often doubled as an official for many government departments, including court registrar (Department for Courts), customs officer (New Zealand Customs Service) and immigration officer (Department of Labour – New Zealand Immigration Service).

A District Court judge sent from either the North Island or the South Island presides over court sittings, but urgent sittings may take place at the Wellington District Court.

Because of the isolation and small population, some of the rules governing daily activities undergo a certain relaxation. For example, every transport service operated solely on Great Barrier Island, the Chatham Islands or Stewart Island need not comply with section 70C of the Transport Act 1962 (the requirements for drivers to maintain driving-hours logbooks). Drivers subject to section 70B must nevertheless keep record of their driving hours in some form.

The Canterbury District Health Board is responsible for providing publicly funded health services for the island. Prior to July 2015, this was the responsibility of the Hawke's Bay District Health Board.

== Economy and infrastructure ==
The largest sector of the Chatham Island economy is fishing for crayfish (lobster), shellfish, finfish and kina (sea urchins), followed by farming, and then tourism. This economic mix has been stable for the past 50 years, as little infrastructure or population is present to engage in higher levels of industrial or telecommunications activity.

Two 225 kW wind turbines and diesel generators provide mains power on Chatham Island, at costs of five to ten times that of electricity on the main islands of New Zealand. During 2014, 65% of the electricity was generated from diesel generators, the balance from wind. For heating, electricity comes second to wood. In 2013, solar power contributed about a third as much as mains-generated electricity.

=== External transport ===
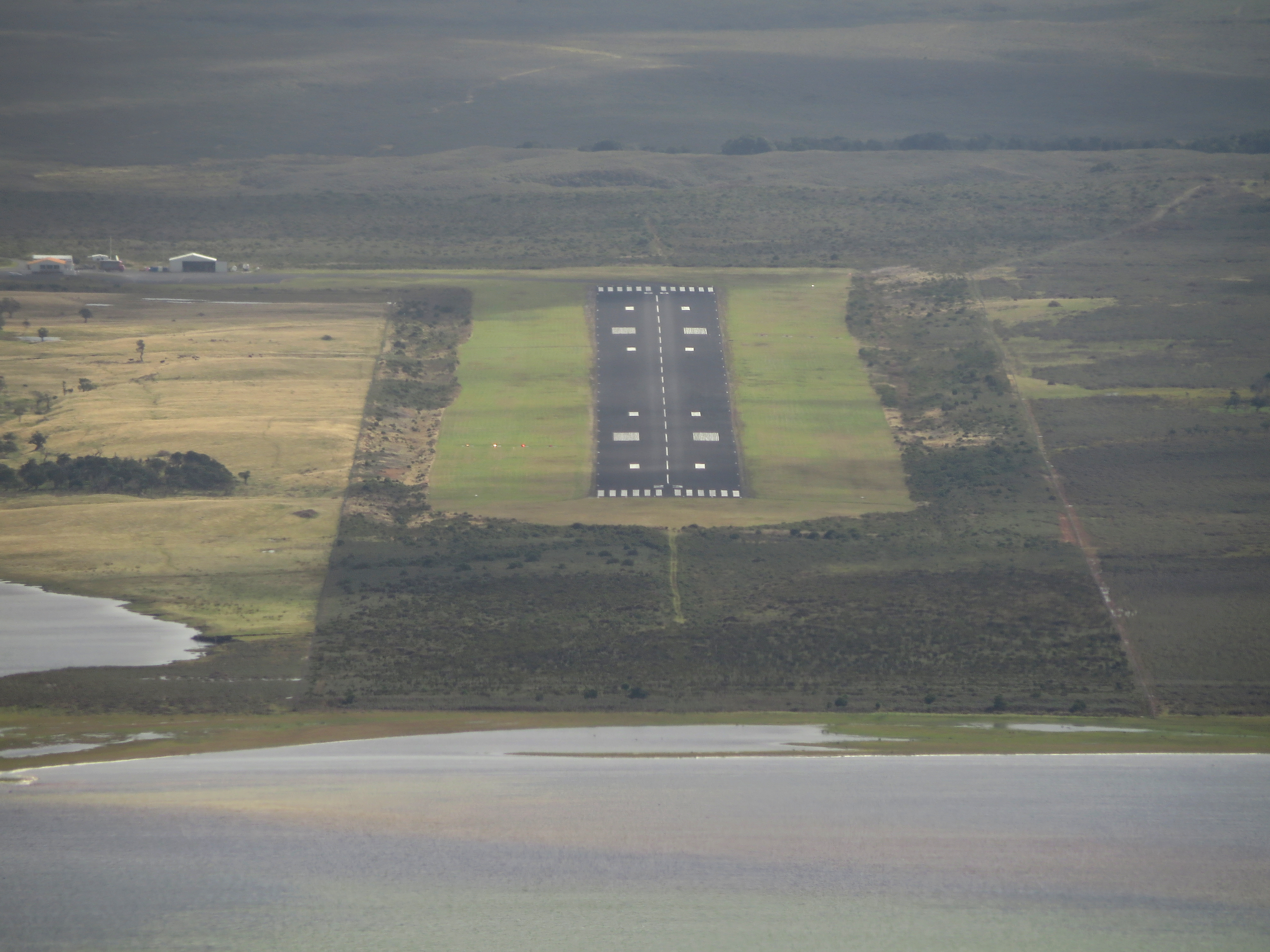
Tuuta Airport is the arrival point for most visitors to the Chathams.

Visitors to the Chathams usually arrive by air from Auckland, Christchurch or Wellington (around two hours from Christchurch on an ATR 72–500 aircraft) to Tuuta Airport on Chatham Island. While freight generally arrives by ship (two days sailing time), the sea journey takes too long for many passengers, and is not always available.

Tasman Empire Airways Ltd (TEAL) initially serviced the Chathams by air using flying boats. With the withdrawal of TEAL, the RNZAF maintained an infrequent service with Short Sunderland flying boats. NZ4111 was damaged on takeoff from Te Whanga Lagoon on 4 November 1959. Its engines, radar and radio were salvaged in 1960 and the rest of the wreck was repurposed by residents around the island. The last flight by RNZAF flying boats was on 22 March 1967. For many years Bristol Freighter aircraft served the islands, a slow and noisy freight aircraft converted for carrying passengers by installing a removable passenger compartment equipped with airline seats and a toilet in part of the cargo hold. The air service primarily served to ship out high-value export crayfish products.

The grass landing field at Hapupu, at the northern end of the Island, proved a limiting factor, as few aircraft apart from the Bristol Freighter had both the range to fly to the islands and the ruggedness to land on the grass airstrip. Although other aircraft did use the landing field occasionally, they would often require repairs to fix damage resulting from the rough landing. Hapupu is also the site of the Hāpūpū / J M Barker Historic Reserve (one of only two national historic reserves in New Zealand), where there are momori rakau (Moriori tree carvings).

In 1981, after many years of requests by locals and the imminent demise of the ageing Bristol Freighters, the construction of a sealed runway at Karewa, Tuuta Airport, allowed more modern aircraft to land safely. The Chathams' own airline, Air Chathams, with its head office in Te One, operates services to Auckland, Wellington and Christchurch. The timetable varies seasonally, but generally planes depart the Chathams around 09:30 am (Chathams Time) and arrive in the mainland around 11am and depart again at around 2 pm (NZ time) back to the Chathams. Air Chathams operates twin turboprop ATR 72–500 aircraft (freight and passenger) and dedicated freighter Saab 340 aircraft. The freighter is mainly used to supplement the ATR capacity during crayfish season for the transport of live export crayfish.

The ship Rangatira provided a freight service from Timaru to the Chatham Islands from March 2000 to August 2015. The MV Southern Tiare provides a freight service between Napier, Timaru and the Chathams.

=== Internal transport ===
Boats are used to transport people between the islands. In 1902 four people lost their lives when the whaling boat they were sailing on from Pitt Island to Ōwenga sank in the Pitt Strait. On 17 July 1931, 11 people drowned when the 36 feet (11 m) long cutter-rigged launch Te Aroha sunk during a storm while sailing the 24 miles (39 km) from Kaingaroa to Ōwenga while transporting people to play in a football match. No bodies were ever found, only a severed hand. To date this has been the greatest single maritime loss of people on the islands. Lost were Bishop Ashton, Taaka Ngata, B. Remi, H. Stone, brothers Joseph and William Paynter, brothers Edward, Michael and Waiti Thompson, James Whaitirl and Ririmu Wiki. Up until the late 1960s boats were also regularly used to connect the settlements on the edges of the Te Whanga Lagoon.

By the 1920s a number of formal tracks had been created around the ports. After the end of the Second World War the Ministry of Works constructed a gravel road and bridges to Ōwenga. Tracks continued to be created but often did not conform with the "paper roads" on Smith's survey. Most islanders continued to travel by horses. To transport a number of people or freight, islanders would use a cart pulled by a single horse called a "konake" or "Chatham islands truck", which had a pair of wheels at the rear and sled-type runners at the front which assisted it in travelling over the soft soil covering the island. Another option was a "jogger" which was pulled by two horses and which used pneumatic tires. The tracks, or lack of them, were so bad that Norman Kirk (who was the local MP) on a visit to the islands in the late 1950s described a trip by Land Rover that took four hours to cover 31 miles. The Land Rover was accompanied by a tractor whose task it was to pull the other vehicle out when it became bogged.

Using funds provided by the New Zealand government, a project was undertaken in 1969–70 to turn these tracks into formal roads to connect the airport at Hapapu, Kaingaroa, Manganui, Port Hutt, the Tuku and roads around Waitangi. The contract was awarded to Roger Mahon from Canterbury who shipped construction equipment to the islands. With the agreements of the islanders, he and the project engineer Brian Pease chose the best route, rather than follow the paper roads laid out in the 1870s and 1880s. The islanders assisted in the work by providing quarried rock and other hardfill at little or no cost to the project. Due to the benefits they were receiving from the improvement in access to their properties, landowners opted to receive no compensation for the value of the land taken for the roads. As a road was constructed, the surveyor Kenneth Wynne followed behind pegging out the legal road boundaries of what in many cases were wider roads and more roads than specified in the contract.

There is a small section of tar-sealed road between Waitangi and Te One, but the majority of the roads are gravel.

=== Telecommunications ===
A 1.5 kW wireless radiotelegraph link opened in 1913, a public radio link to the mainland was built in 1953 and an island phone system in 1965. The Chatham Islands were the last place in New Zealand to have a manual telephone exchange, switching to an automatic exchange on 18 July 1990. In 2003 a digital microwave system was installed for 110 phones in Ōwenga.

The islands were linked as part of the Rural Broadband Initiative in 2014, when satellite bandwidth was increased, and broadband is now provided by Wireless Nation, though Farmside provide some coverage.

As late as 2019 there was no mobile phone coverage on the islands. In December 2021, five 4G cellular towers were turned on to enable mobile phone coverage on Chatham and Pitt Island and deliver faster broadband. The main tower is positioned on Target Hill, which transmits to the other four towers through a microwave radio link; it is backhauled by Eutelsat 172B to a network in Wellington. The upgraded network delivers greater bandwidth than the previous link, and provides reliable broadband.

== Education ==
There are three primary schools, which are at Kaingaroa, Te One, and Pitt Island with rolls of 6, 59 and 11 respectively (as of July 2026. Kaingaroa School opened in 1928, Te One School was open by 1897, and Pitt Island School was open by 1902. Pitt Island and Kaingaroa Schools are staffed by sole charge principals, while Te One has three teachers and a principal. The schools cater for children from year 1 to 8. There is no secondary school. The majority of secondary school-aged students leave the island for boarding schools in mainland New Zealand. A small number remain on the island and obtain their secondary education by correspondence. There is no tertiary education institution on the islands.

== Unofficial flag ==
Chatham Islands
- Use: Small vexillological symbol or pictogram in black and white showing the different uses of the flag

The unofficial flag of the Chatham Islands is a blue field with a map of the island in the centre, the Te Whanga Lagoon depicted in white. Behind this device map is a depiction of the rising sun, an allusion to its local name Rēkohu, meaning 'rising sun'. The flag was designed in 1989 by Logan Alderson, a former New Zealand police officer.

At the 2005 opening of a new marae on the islands (which included a rare visit by the Prime Minister), the Chathams flag was flown on a flagpole over the marae.

== Notable people ==
- Richard Charteris (b. 1948), New Zealand musicologist
- Abe Jacobs (1928–2023), New Zealand professional wrestler
- Te Kiato Riwai (1912–1967), New Zealand nurse and Māori welfare officer
- Brendon Tuuta (b. 1965), New Zealand international rugby league player

== See also ==
- 1924 Chatham Islands expedition
- 1954 Chatham Islands expedition
- History of Chatham Islands numismatics
- List of historic places in the Chatham Islands
- List of islands of New Zealand

== Bibliography ==
- Anderson, Atholl (2014). "Te ao tawhito: The old world". In Anderson, Atholl; Binney, Judith; Harris, Aroha (eds.). Tangata Whenua: An Illustrated History. Bridget Williams Books. ISBN 978-1-927131-41-1.
- Clark, Ross (1994). "Moriori and Māori: The Linguistic Evidence". In Sutton, Douglas G. (ed.). The Origins of the First New Zealanders. Auckland: Auckland University Press.
- Davis, Denise; Solomon, Māui (2005). "Moriori – Origins of the Moriori people". Te Ara – the Encyclopedia of New Zealand.
- Diamond, Jared (1997). Guns, Germs, and Steel: The Fates of Human Societies. New York: W. W. Norton.
- Harper, Paul (15 October 2010). "Voter turnout up in local elections". The New Zealand Herald.
- Howe, Kerry R. (2005). "Ideas about Māori origins". Te Ara – the Encyclopedia of New Zealand.
- King, Michael (2000) [First ed. 1989]. Moriori: A People Rediscovered (Rev. ed.). Viking. ISBN 978-0-14-010391-5.
- McFadgen, B. G. (March 1994). "Archaeology and Holocene sand dune stratigraphy on Chatham Island". Journal of the Royal Society of New Zealand. 24 (1): 17–44. Bibcode:1994JRSNZ..24...17M. doi:10.1080/03014223.1994.9517454.
- Waitangi Tribunal. 2001. Rekohu: A Report on Moriori and Ngati Mutunga Claims in the Chatham Islands. Report No. 64.
