= Torotoro =

Torotoro is the name of:

- Torotoro (Bolivia) - a small town in the Potosí Department in Bolivia
- Torotoro National Park - a national park in the Potosí Department in Bolivia
- Torotoro (Moriori) - Moriori resident in 1791 of Kaingaroa, Chatham Islands, New Zealand
- Syma torotoro - the yellow-billed kingfisher
- Kishika Torotoro, a character from the anime and mage series The 100 Girlfriends Who Really, Really, Really, Really, Really Love You
