= Patteson =

Patteson may refer to:

== Surname ==
- John Patteson (1755–1833) (1755–1833), English Tory politician
- John Staniforth Patteson, Mayor of Norwich (1823)
- Henry Staniforth Patteson, Norwich politician
- Henry Tywhitt Stanifoth Patteson, Norwich politician, High Sheriff of Norfolk in 1907
- John Patteson (bishop) (1827–1871), Anglican bishop and martyr
- Lee Hawse Patteson (1902–1953), the wife of former Governor of West Virginia Okey L. Patteson, and First Lady, 1949–1953
- Okey L. Patteson (1898–1989), 23rd Governor of West Virginia for the term following the 1948 election
- Roy Kinneer Patteson, Jr. (born 1928), American ancient language scholar
- Susanna Louise Patteson (1853–1922), American stenographer, educator and author

== Given name ==
- Patteson Nickalls (stockbroker) (1836–1910), London stockbroker, Liberal politician, president of the Polo and Riding Pony Society
- Patteson Oti, politician of the Solomon Islands
- Patteson Womersley Nickalls (1877–1946), British polo player who competed in the 1908 Summer Olympics

== See also ==
- Patteson Shoal, outer reef in the Reef Islands, in the Solomon Islands province of Temotu
- Patteson-Schutte House, historic house located on the south side of the James River in Richmond, Virginia
