= HMS Chatham (1788) =

Royal Navy brig best known as Discovery's tender in the Vancouver Expedition

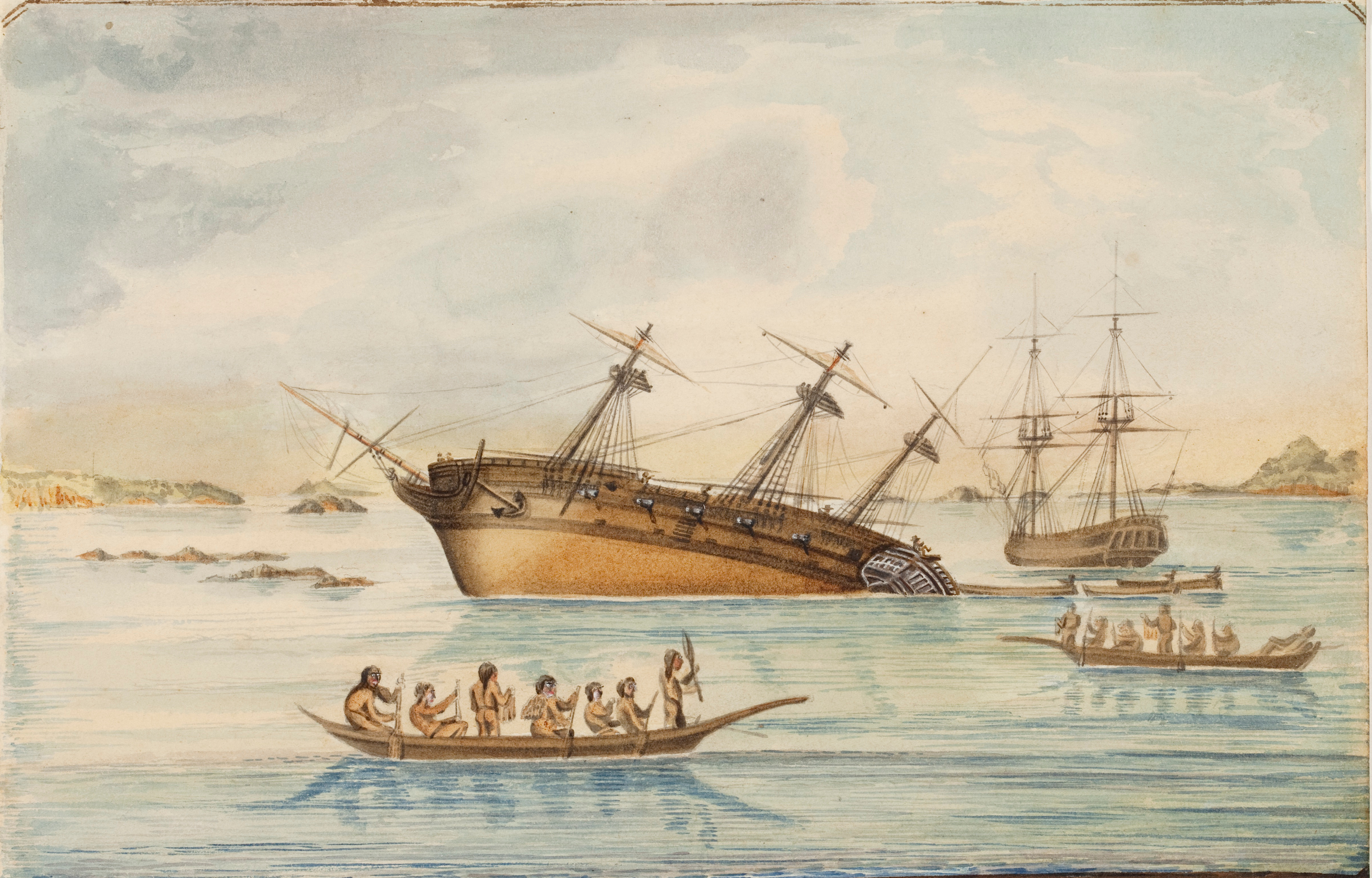
- The Chatham near Fife Sound in Queen Charlotte Strait (1792)

History

Great Britain
- Name: HMS Chatham
- Builder: King, Dover
- Launched: 1788
- Acquired: 12 February 1788
- Fate: Sold in 1830

General characteristics
- Class & type: 4-gun survey brig
- Tons burthen: 133 bm
- Length: 80 ft (24.4 m)
- Beam: 22 ft (6.7 m)
- Propulsion: Sails
- Sail plan: Brig
- Complement: 45
- Armament: Four 3-pdr guns; 6 swivels

HMS Chatham was a Royal Navy survey brig, built in 1788, that accompanied HMS Discovery on George Vancouver's exploration of the West Coast of North America in his 1791–1795 expedition.

== Purchase ==
Chatham was built by King, at Dover, as a merchant brig, and launched in early 1788. She was purchased for navy service as a tender on 12 February 1788.

== The Vancouver Expedition ==
The first significant voyage by Chatham was Vancouver's five-year mission to the South Seas and Pacific Northwest coast of America. Her commander was Lieutenant William Robert Broughton, with 2nd Lieutenant James Hanson.

In November 1791, while exploring the South Pacific, Broughton's crew were the first Europeans to sight the Chatham Islands, which they named after the John Pitt, Earl of Chatham, the First Lord of the Admiralty. Among the other achievements of Chatham's crew was the exploration of the Columbia River as far as the Columbia River Gorge, reaching present-day eastern Multnomah County east of Portland and north west of Mount Hood. A plaque erected by the State of Oregon along Interstate 84 commemorates the spot where Broughton landed in 1792.

In 1792, while near Fife Sound in Queen Charlotte Strait, the ship ran aground on rocks within a day, and about 2 miles (3.2 km) away, from where Discovery had done the same.

In November 1792 Chatham's commander was sent back to England with dispatches; Peter Puget was her commander through her return to England on 17 October 1794.

Chatham was at Plymouth on 20 January 1795 and so shared in the proceeds of the detention of the Dutch naval vessels, East Indiamen, and other merchant vessels that were in port on the outbreak of war between Britain and the Netherlands.

Chatham had suffered severe wear on her long voyage, and was repaired at Deptford in 1797.

== Fate ==
Chatham continued in Royal Navy service until 1830, when she was sold in Jamaica.

=== The lost anchor ===
In 2008, a scuba fisherman found a 900-pound (410 kg) anchor off Whidbey Island in Washington that he and others believe was lost from HMS Chatham on 9 June 1792. Northwest historian Richard Blumenthal stated that, "They indeed found an anchor that fits the description of the anchor lost at that time". In June 2014, the anchor was raised to be assessed to see if it is actually the sole remaining relic of Capt. George Vancouver's famed 1792 voyage into Puget Sound. After conservation and testing at Texas A&M's Center for Maritime Archaeology and Conservation, the weight of the anchor was put at 2,425 pounds (1,100 kg)—about 1,000 pounds (450 kg) heavier than anchors used in those years. An anchor weighing that much would have been used in the 1820s, not in 1792.

== Plans ==
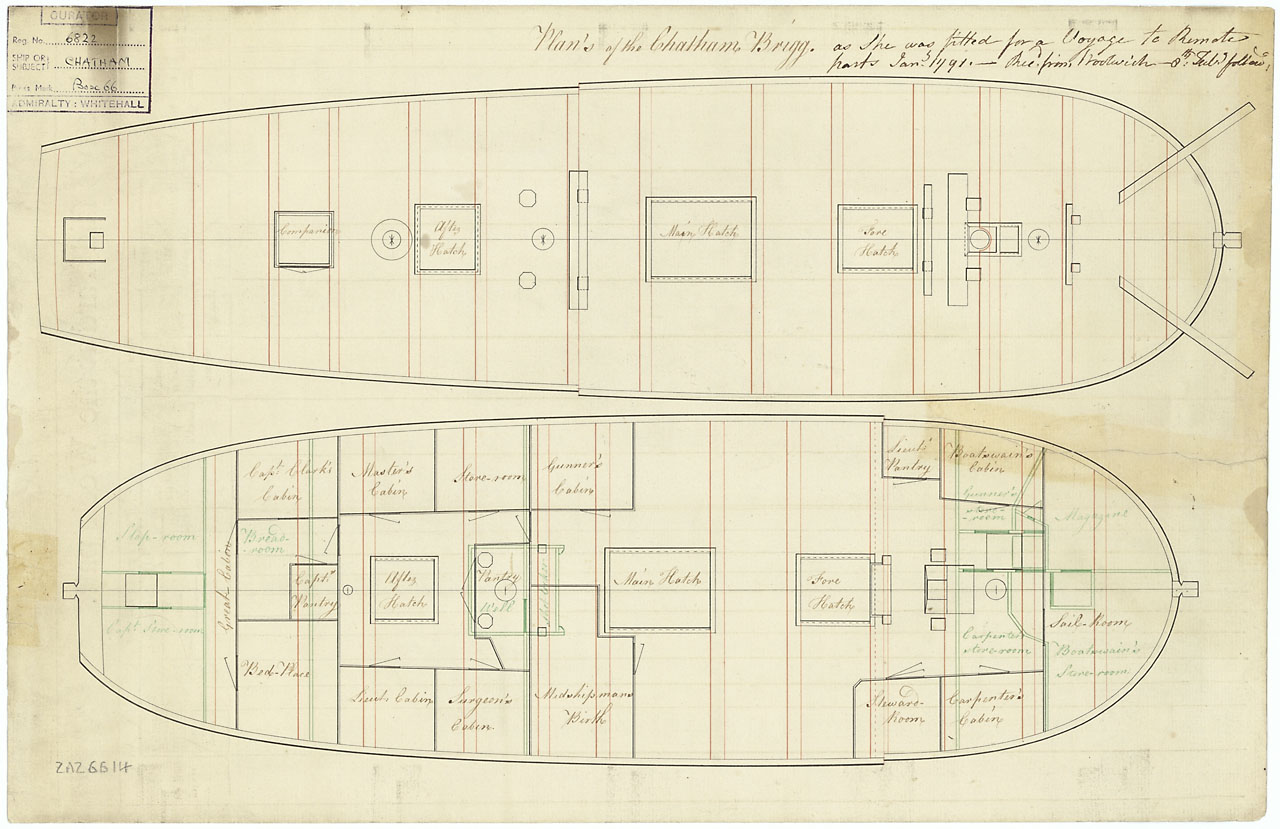
Plan of the upper and lower decks with platforms, for the Chatham

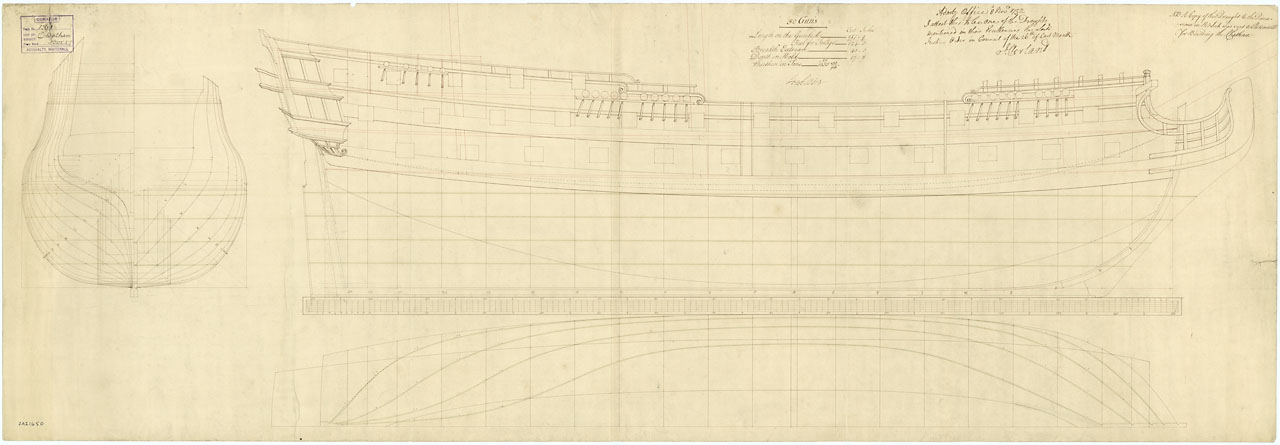
Plan showing the body plan, sheer lines, and longitudinal half-breadth, for the Chatham

== See also ==
- European and American voyages of scientific exploration
- Torotoro
