= Te Roto =

Rural settlement on Chatham Island, New Zealand

Coordinates: 43°49′05″S 176°34′44″W

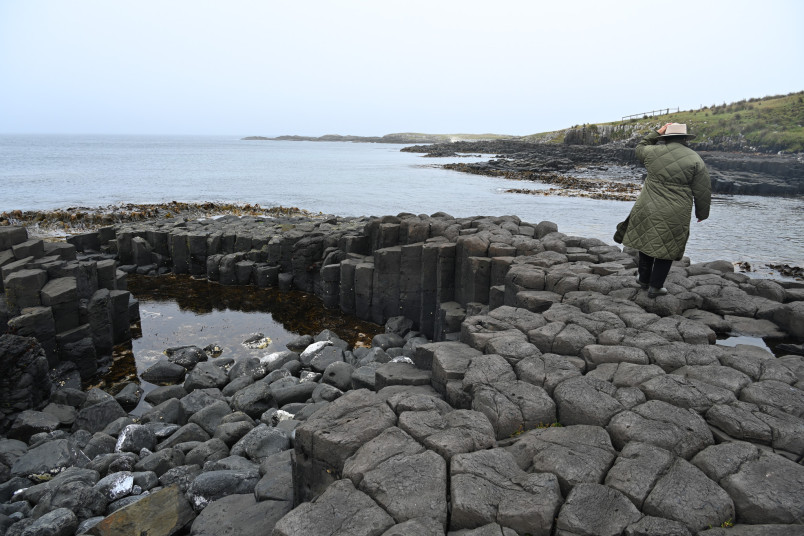
The governor-general, Dame Cindy Kiro, viewing the columnar basalt at Ohira Bay in December 2024

Te Roto (Māori for "The Lake") is a small settlement on Chatham Island, in New Zealand's Chatham Islands group. It is located close to the northern end of Petre Bay, 12 kilometres north of Waitangi. A small lake of the same name is located nearby. There is also an urupā (cemetery).

A notable rock formation of columnar basalt can be seen at Ohira Bay, 4 km to the west of Te Roto, on the coast close to the Te Roto-Port Hutt road.
