= Patteson-Schutte House =

The Patteson-Schutte House is a historic house located on the south side of the James River in Richmond, Virginia. It is likely to be one of the earliest extant buildings within the City of Richmond. It was built sometime between 1725 and 1750 by James Patteson, the overseer of a south side plantation owned by Benjamin Schutte, a Richmond planter. William Byrd III, son of William Byrd II, the founder of Richmond sold over 100 acres to Schutte who farmed and sold the produce to local groceries. At the time of the Patteson-Schutte House construction, William Byrd III was living at Westover Plantation in Charles City County. After the great depression, the Schutte family sold off the land and the home and moved to a nearby community. The home had a few owners until it was purchased by the Historic Richmond Foundation, in March 2006 and sold it in 2011, retaining easements.

== Architectural description ==
Patteson-Schutte is a 1 1/2-story Transitional style frame structure with basement. End chimneys, which are slightly off-center, and a steep peaked roof are iconic architectural elements of Southern Colonial vernacular architecture.

A 2006 survey of Patteson-Schutte conducted by Calder Loth, Senior Architectural Historian at the Virginia Department of Historic Resources, states, "While not a grand house, it was a residence of the gentry class, a carefully constructed, distinctly Virginia structure worthy of preservation. While originally built as a Chesterfield County planter's residence, today it is among the very few 18th century frame structures within the city limits of Richmond."
