= Torotoro (Moriori) =

Moriori fisherman shot and killed by British sailors

Torotoro was a Moriori resident of Kaingaroa on north-east Chatham Island who was killed in a skirmish with Lieutenant Broughton's men of HMS Chatham (for which the Chatham Islands were subsequently named) over a dispute concerning his fishing gear on 29 November 1791. A memorial to Torotoro is above the beach at Kaingaroa.

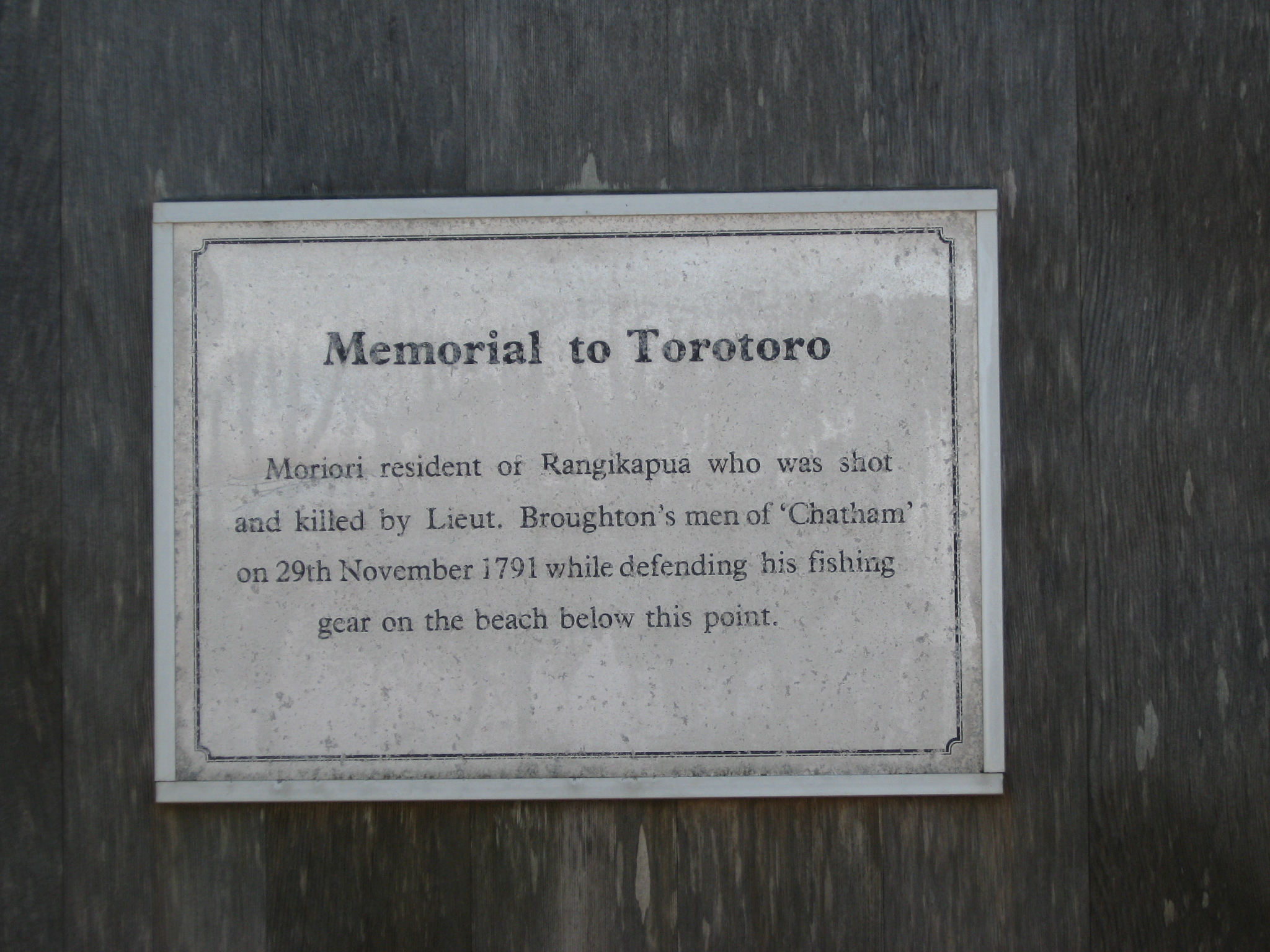
Plaque at the Torotoro Memorial

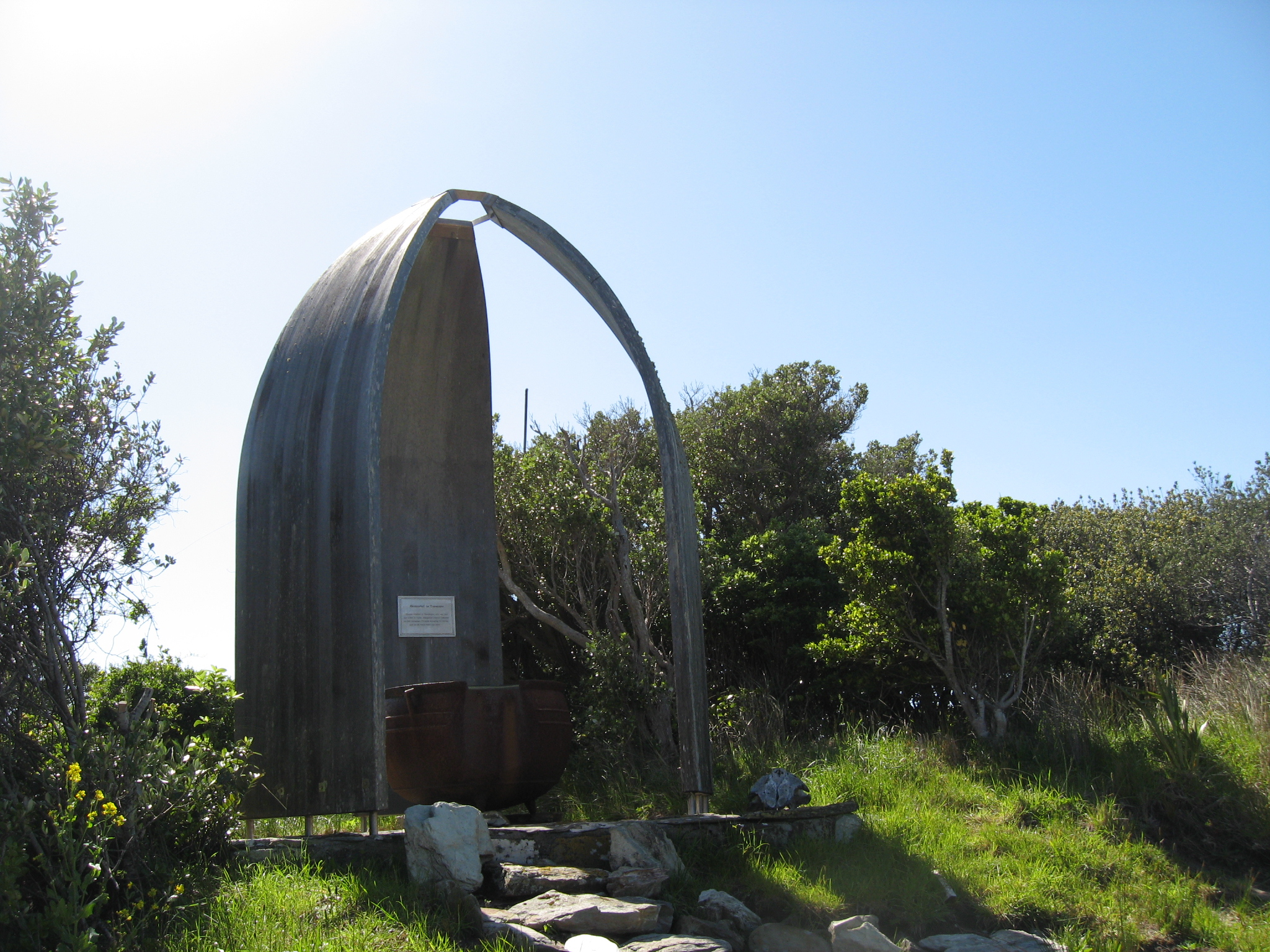
Torotoro Memorial

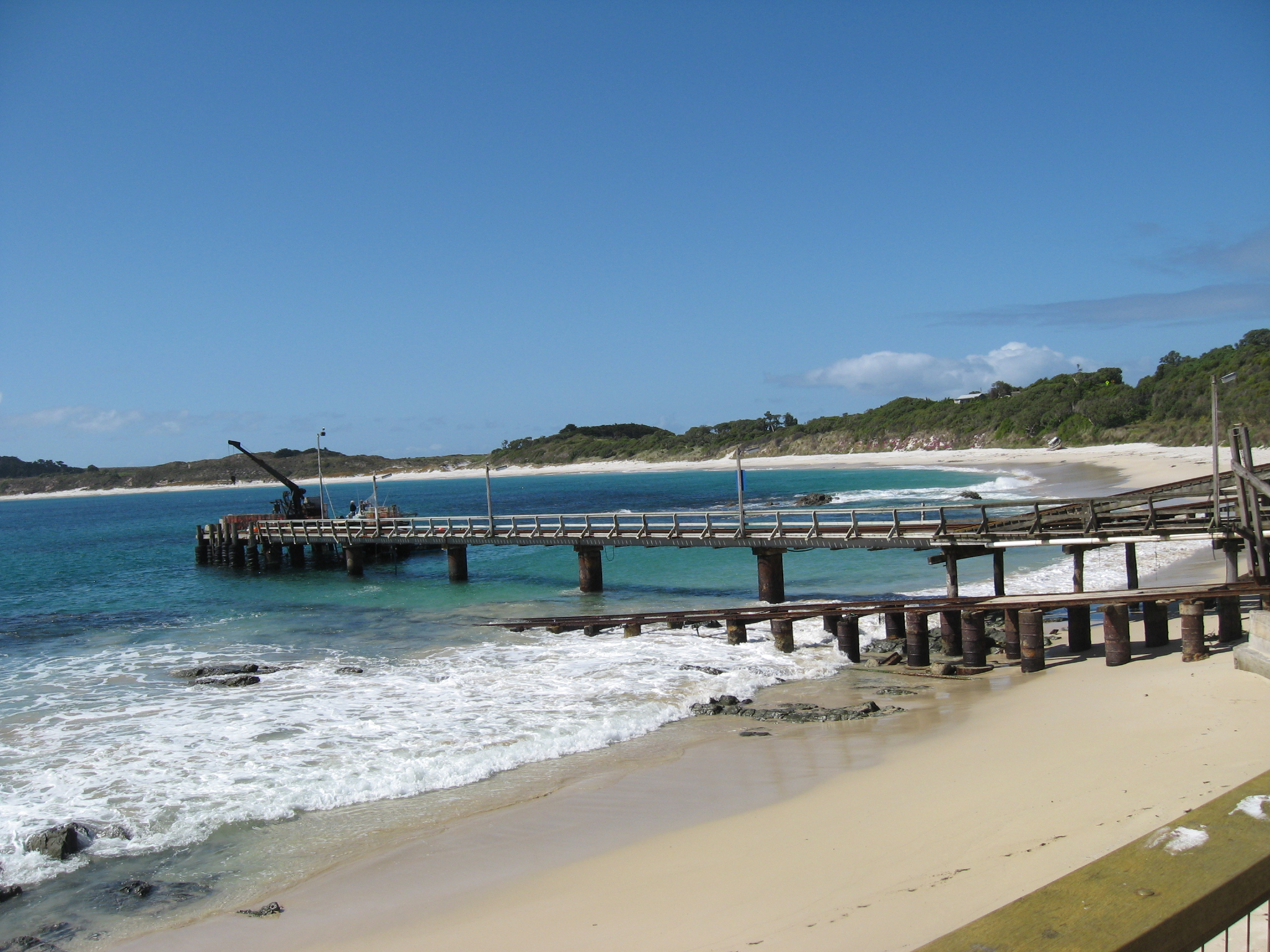
Kaingaroa wharf and beach
