= Cape Pattisson =

Headland on Chatham Island, New Zealand

Coordinates: 43°44′43″S 176°48′08″W

Cape Pattisson is a headland in the northwest of Chatham Island, the largest island in the Chatham Islands chain, located 800 km east of New Zealand's South Island.
