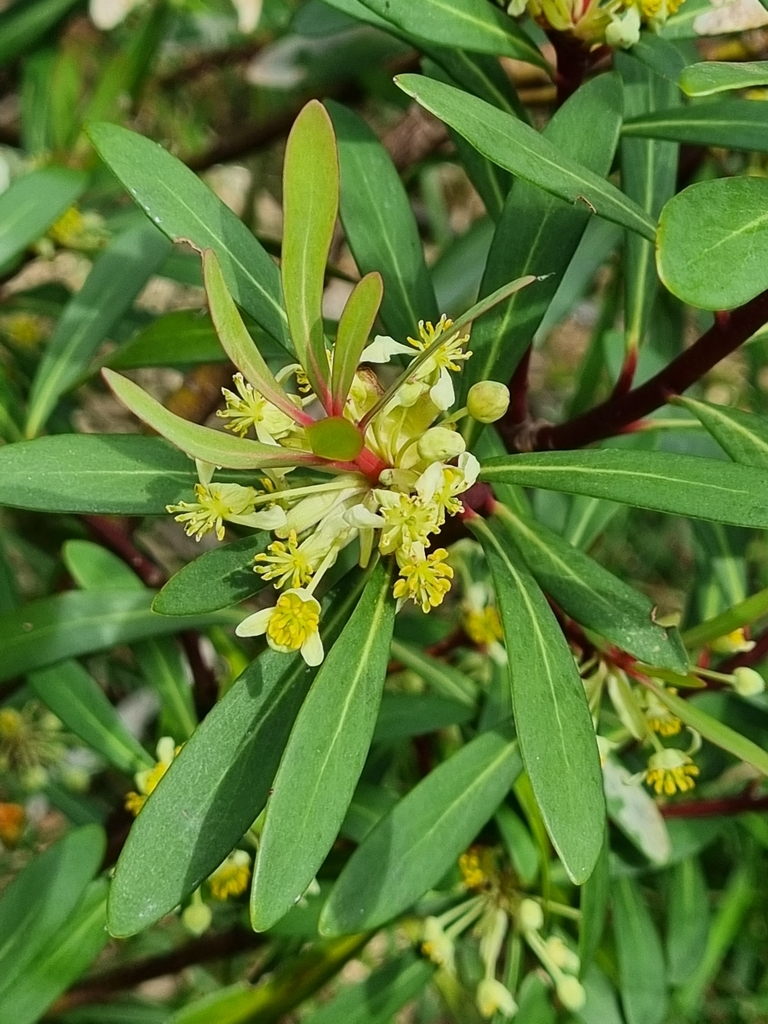
- Flowers near Falls Creek

Scientific classification
- Kingdom: Plantae
- Clade: Tracheophytes
- Clade: Angiosperms
- Clade: Magnoliids
- Order: Canellales
- Family: Winteraceae
- Genus: Tasmannia
- Species: T. xerophila

Binomial name
- Tasmannia xerophila Max Gray

Synonyms
- Drimys piperita entity 39 'xerophila' Vink; Drimys xerophila P.Parm. nom. illeg.; Drimys xerophila P.Parm. var. xerophila; Drimys xerophylla A.D.Chapm. orth. var.

= Tasmannia xerophila =

Alpine pepperbush

Species of shrub

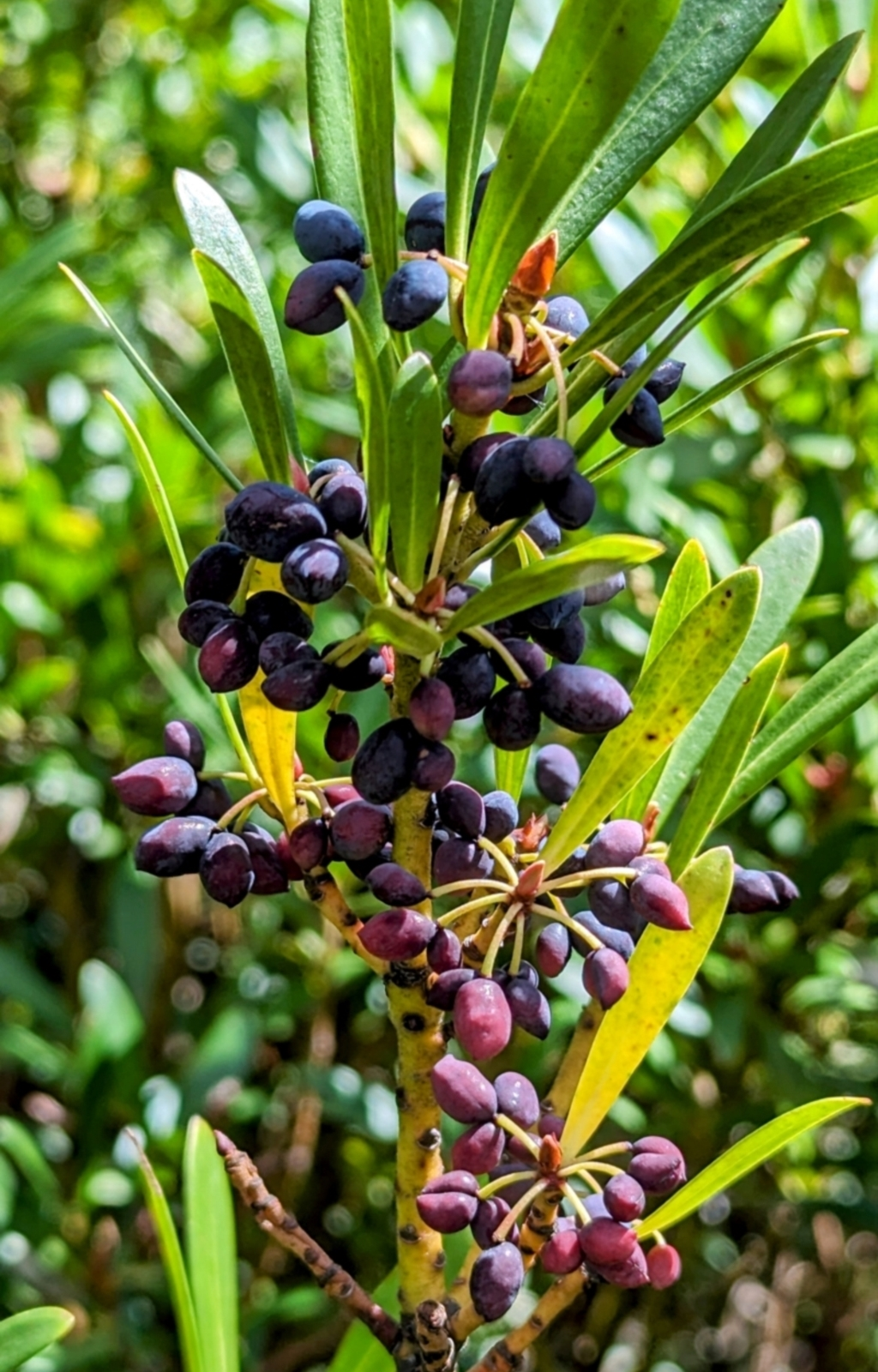
Fruit of subsp. xerophila in Kosciuszko National Park

Tasmannia xerophila, commonly known as alpine pepperbush, is a species of flowering plant in the family Winteraceae and is endemic to south-eastern continental Australia. It is a bushy shrub to small tree with lance-shaped leaves, the narrower end towards the base. Male and female flowers are borne on separate plants, the male flowers with 9 to 30 stamens and the female flowers with up to 8 carpels. The fruit is glossy black and contains 2 to 7 seeds.

== Description ==
Tasmannia xerophila is a bushy shrub to small tree that typically grows to a height of 0.6–4 m (2 ft 0 in – 13 ft 1 in) and usually forms clumps, the branchlets reddish-brown. The leaves are leathery, lance-shaped to narrowly so, with the narrower end towards the base, mostly 30–140 mm (1.2–5.5 in) long and 5–30 mm (0.20–1.18 in) wide on a petiole 2–6 mm (0.079–0.236 in) long. Male and female flowers are borne on separate plants, male flowers on a pedicel 7–23 mm (0.28–0.91 in) long with 9 to 30 stamens. Female flowers are borne on a pedicel 5–16 mm (0.20–0.63 in) long and usually have 2 petals 5–7 mm (0.20–0.28 in) long and 1–2 mm (0.039–0.079 in) wide, and up to 8 carpels with 2 to 9 ovules. Flowering occurs from December to February and the fruit is glossy black to glaucous, 6.5–11 mm (0.26–0.43 in) long, containing 2 to 7 seeds 2.5–3.5 mm (0.098–0.138 in) long and 2.0–2.5 mm (0.079–0.098 in) wide.

== Taxonomy ==
This species was first formally described by Paul Évariste Parmentier, who gave it the name Drimys xerophila in Bulletin Scientifique de la France et de la Belgique, but the name was illegitimate. In 1976, Max Gray transferred the species to Tasmannia and legitimised the name T. zerophila in Contributions from the Herbarium Australiense.

In 1994, Ruth E. Raleigh and others described subspecies robusta, and the name, and that of the autonym are accepted by the Australian Plant Census:

- Tasmannia xerophila subsp. robusta Raleigh commonly known as Errinundra pepper, is a shrub to small tree up to 4 m (13 ft) high with leaves 70–140 mm (2.8–5.5 in) long and 20–30 mm (0.79–1.18 in) wide on a petiole 3.5–6 mm (0.14–0.24 in) long, and female flowers with up to 8 carpels containing 3 to 7 ovules per carpel.
- Tasmannia xerophila M.Gray subsp. xerophila commonly known as alpine pepper is a shrub up to 2.5 m (8 ft 2 in) high with leaves 30–90 mm (1.2–3.5 in) long and 5–17 mm (0.20–0.67 in) wide on a petiole 1.5–3 mm (0.059–0.118 in) long, and female flowers with usually up to 6 carpels containing 2 to 9 ovules per carpel.

== Distribution and habitat ==
Subspecies robusta grows in tall, open forest on Mount Ellery and Goonmirk Rocks in East Gippsland, Victoria. Subspecies xerophila has a wider distribution in open forest, woodland or subalpine grassland from the central highland of southern New South Wales and the Australian Capital Territory to the eastern parts of the Great Dividing Range in Victoria, where it often grows in snow gum woodland.
