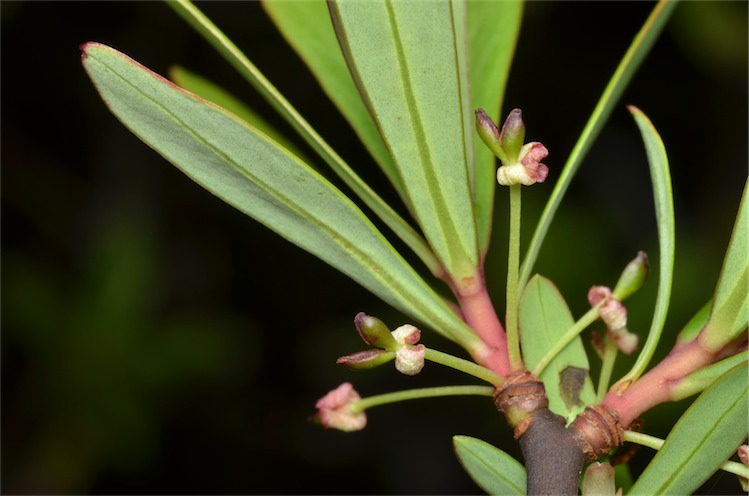
- Female flowers
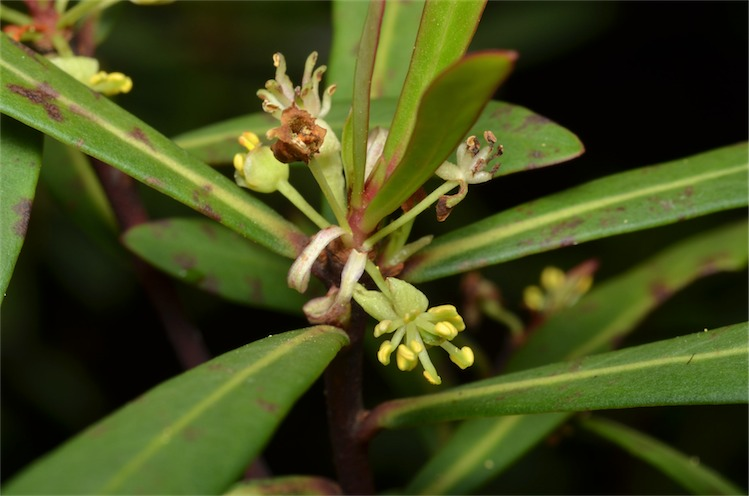
- Male flowers

Conservation status
- Vulnerable (EPBC Act)

Scientific classification
- Kingdom: Plantae
- Clade: Tracheophytes
- Clade: Angiosperms
- Clade: Magnoliids
- Order: Canellales
- Family: Winteraceae
- Genus: Tasmannia
- Species: T. glaucifolia

Binomial name
- Tasmannia glaucifolia J.B.Williams

= Tasmannia glaucifolia =

Species of shrub

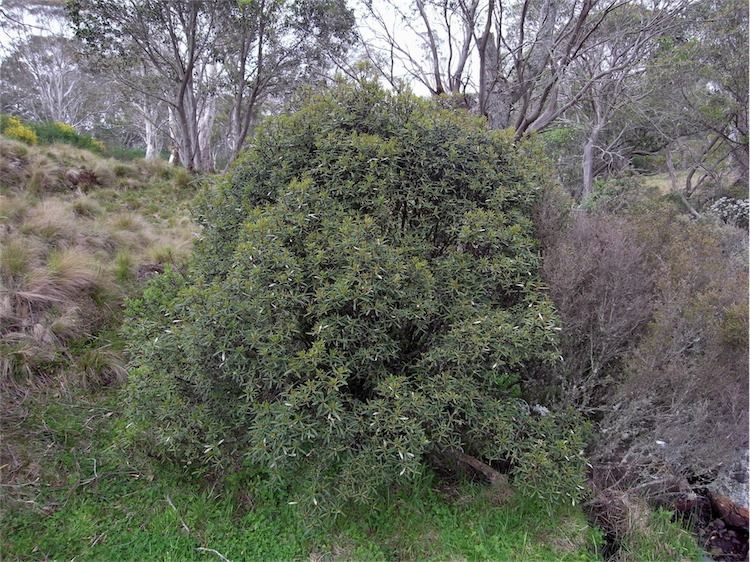
Habit in the Barrington Tops National Park

Tasmannia glaucifolia, commonly known as fragrant pepperbush, is a species of flowering plant in the family Winteraceae, and is endemic to New South Wales. It is a dioecious shrub with lance-shaped leaves, the narrower end towards the base, the flowers usually without petals, male and female flowers on separate plants and the fruit is a glossy, deep purple-black berry.

== Description ==
Tasmannia glaucifolia is a bushy, spreading shrub that typically grows to a height of 2–3 m (6 ft 7 in – 9 ft 10 in) and has glossy purple branches. The leaves are lance-shaped with the narrower end towards the base, 40–60 mm (1.6–2.4 in) long and 4–15 mm (0.16–0.59 in) wide, the lower surface glaucous, densely pimply and the leaves have a peppery smell when crushed. Male and female flowers are borne on separate plants, and the plants also reproduce by root suckers. The flowers usually lack petals, male flowers on a pedicel 7–22 mm (0.28–0.87 in) long with 8 to 24 stamens, female flowers on a pedicel 4–12 mm (0.16–0.47 in) long with 1 or 2 carpels and 4 to 13 ovules. Flowering occurs in November and December and the fruit is a spherical to oval, deep purple-black berry about 5 mm (0.20 in) in diameter with up to 4 seeds 2–3 mm (0.079–0.118 in) long.

== Taxonomy ==
Tasmannia glaucifolia was first formally described in 1988 by John Beaumont Williams in the Australian Journal of Botany, from specimens he collected near Point Lookout in 1979. The specific epithet (glaucifolia) means "bluish-gey or bluish-green".

== Distribution and habitat ==
Fragrant pepperbush occurs in 3 separate areas – the Gloucester Tops and Barrington Tops area, Ben Halls Gap National Park and near Point Lookout in the New England National Park. It usually grows in soils derived from basalt, sometimes granite, near watercourses in cool temperate rainforest, at altitudes between 1,200 and 1,530 m (3,940 and 5,020 ft).

== Conservation status ==
Tasmannia glaucifolia is listed as "vulnerable" under the Australian Government Environment Protection and Biodiversity Conservation Act 1999, and the New South Wales Government Biodiversity Conservation Act 2016 (NSW).
