= Zygogynum oligostigma =

Conservation status
- Endangered (IUCN 2.3)

Scientific classification
- Kingdom: Plantae
- Clade: Tracheophytes
- Clade: Angiosperms
- Clade: Magnoliids
- Order: Canellales
- Family: Winteraceae
- Genus: Zygogynum
- Species: Z. oligostigma

Binomial name
- Zygogynum oligostigma Vink

Species of flowering plant

Zygogynum oligostigma is a species of plant in the family Winteraceae, first described in 1990 by Dutch botanist Willem Vink. It is endemic to New Caledonia and has been given the conservation status of endangered. It is threatened by habitat loss.
