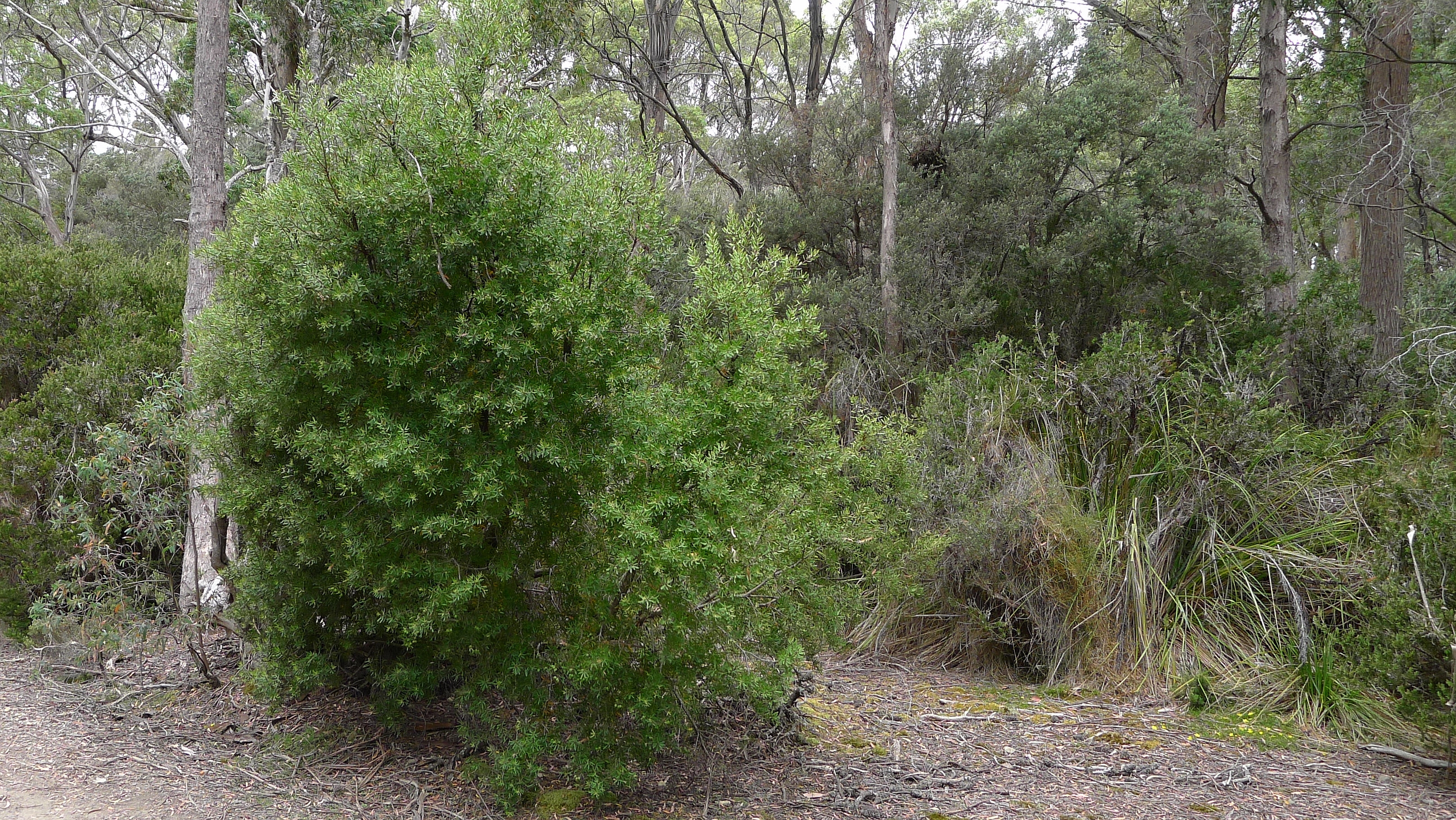

Scientific classification
- Kingdom: Plantae
- Clade: Tracheophytes
- Clade: Angiosperms
- Clade: Eudicots
- Order: Proteales
- Family: Proteaceae
- Genus: Persoonia
- Species: P. muelleri

Binomial name
- Persoonia muelleri Persoonia muelleri (P.Parm.) Orchard

= Persoonia muelleri =

Species of shrub

Persoonia muelleri, commonly known as Mueller’s geebung, is a shrub endemic to Tasmania. It forms a shrub in open areas of wet forests in the west and northeast of the state. It is occasionally confused with P. gunnii though it has larger flowers and longer, straighter leaves.

== Description ==
Persoonia muelleri grows as a shrub or small tree generally from 1 to 4 m (3 1/4 to 13 1/8 ft) tall, though sometimes plants reach 5 m (16 3/8 ft) high. Bark on larger branches and trunk is dark brown and flaky. It has narrow leaves measuring 1.3 to 6 cm (1/2 to 2 3/8 in) long and 0.3–1 cm (1/8–3/8 in) wide. New growth is covered in fine grey to tawny hair. The small flowers are yellow to cream. Var. muelleri flowers from December to February and var. densifolia from January to March.

== Taxonomy ==
The French botanist Paul Évariste Parmentier described this species as Drimys muelleri, placing it in the family Winteraceae, in 1896. Ferdinand von Mueller had sent him leaves and stems without any flowering parts, from which Parmentier had concluded it lay within the genus Drimys, though was not like any existing species. The specimen lay unnoticed until Jim Willis concluded it was Persoonia gunnii. It was given its current name and reclassified in the genus Persoonia by botanist Tony Orchard in 1984. The genus was reviewed by Peter Weston for the Flora of Australia treatment in 1995, and the three endemic Tasmanian species P. muelleri, P. gunnii and P. moscalii are classified in the gunnii group.

There are 3 known subspecies of P. muelleri, which have been also relegated to the rank of variety. Subspecies muelleri has hairless oblanceolate leaves and grows in the northeast of the state. Subspecies augustifolia grows in the west of the state on nutrient poor soils and has narrow, hairy linear to oblanceolate leaves. Subspecies densifolia grows along the south coast and offshore islands and has hairy leaves which are broader than the other subspecies.

Populations with characteristics intermediate between P. muelleri and P. gunnii are known from Lake Dove–Cradle Mountain and Adamsons Peak–South Cape localities.

== Distribution and habitat ==
P. muelleri var. muelleri is found on the central plateau, including Mount Field, and northeastern highlands of the state. It grows in open forest dominated by Eucalyptus or Nothofagus cunninghamii, often in damp areas and south-facing slopes with mossy ground cover.

P. muelleri var. densifolia is found on along the south coast and Bathurst Harbour, as well as on subalpine heathland on Mount Council. It is a component of littoral rainforest and scrub.

== Ecology ==
Persoonia muelleri subsp. densifolia is known to be susceptible to Phytophthora cinnamomi dieback.
