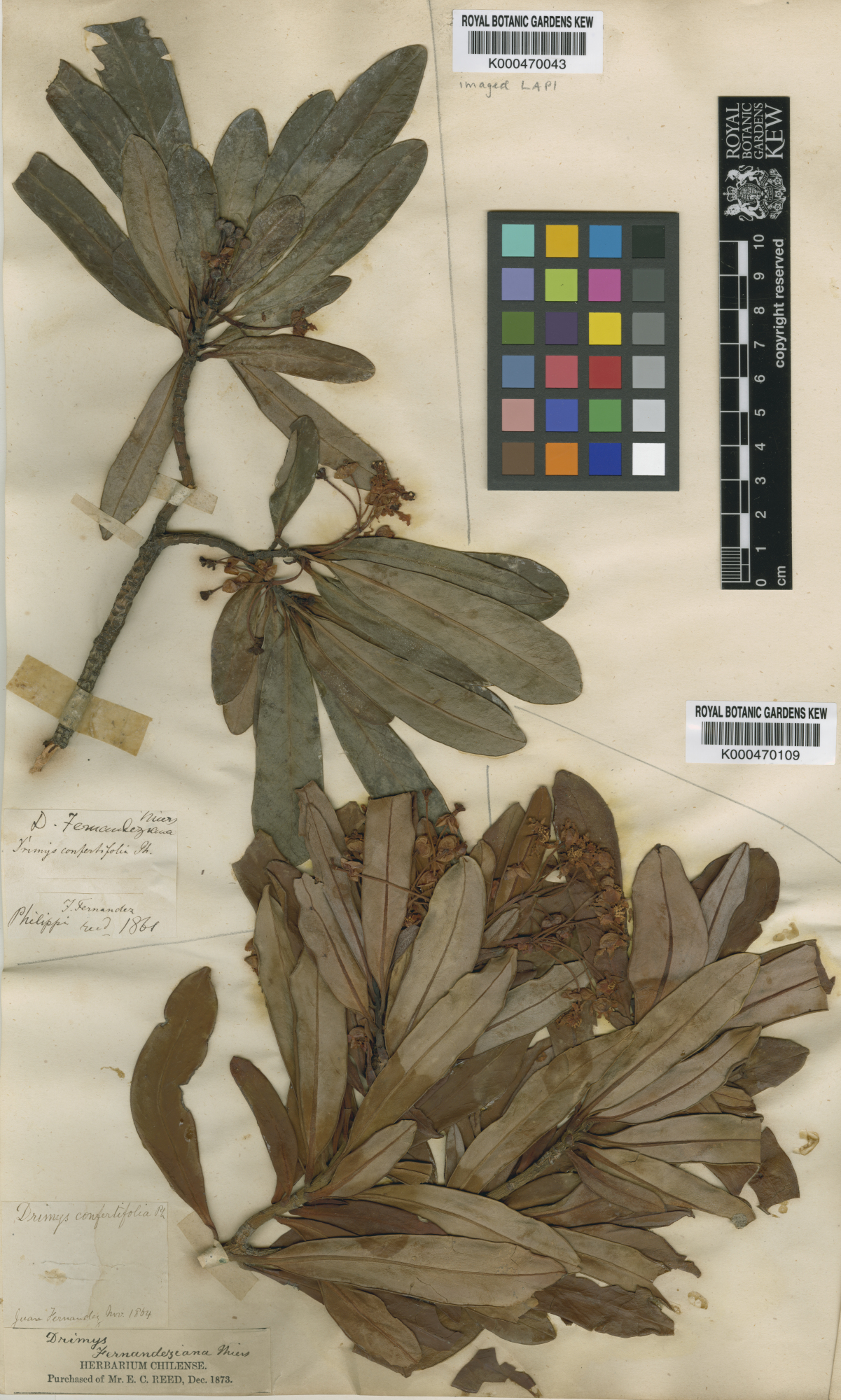
- Specimen at Royal Botanic Gardens, Kew

Conservation status
- Endangered (IUCN 3.1)

Scientific classification
- Kingdom: Plantae
- Clade: Embryophytes
- Clade: Tracheophytes
- Clade: Spermatophytes
- Clade: Angiosperms
- Clade: Magnoliids
- Order: Canellales
- Family: Winteraceae
- Genus: Drimys
- Species: D. confertifolia

Binomial name
- Drimys confertifolia Phil.

Synonyms
- Drimys winteri var. confertifolia (Phil.) Johow; Drimys fernandeziana Steud.; Drimys winteri var. fernandeziana (Steud.) Reiche

= Drimys confertifolia =

Species of flowering plant

Drimys confertifolia is a species of flowering plant in family Winteraceae. It is native to Juan Fernández Islands off the western coast of South America.

== Description ==
Drimys confertifolia is an evergreen tree or large shrub, growing up to 15 meters tall. It flowers from November to January. It is hermaphroditic and wind-pollinated.

== Range and habitat ==
Drimys confertifolia is endemic to the Juan Fernández Islands. It is the dominant tree in lowland dry forest and lower montane forest on Robinson Crusoe Island (Masatierra) and Alejandro Selkirk Island (Masafuera).

Drimys confertifolia is common on Robinson Crusoe Island, where it is a forest tree growing with Myrceugenia fernandeziana (Myrtaceae), Zanthoxylum mayu (Rutaceae), and Juania australis (Arecaceae).

On Alejandro Selkirk Island it is found in small patches or as scattered trees rather than in large pure stands. It grows with the ferns Blechnum cycadifolium (Blechnaceae), Dicksonia externa (Dicksoniaceae), Histiopteris incisa (Dennstaedtiaceae), and Lophosoria quadripinnata (Dicksoniaceae).

== Conservation status ==
Prior to August 10th 2023, Drimys confertifolia was classified as vulnerable by the IUCN Red List, but has since been moved to the Endangered category. The main threats to this species are invasive plants and livestock farming.
