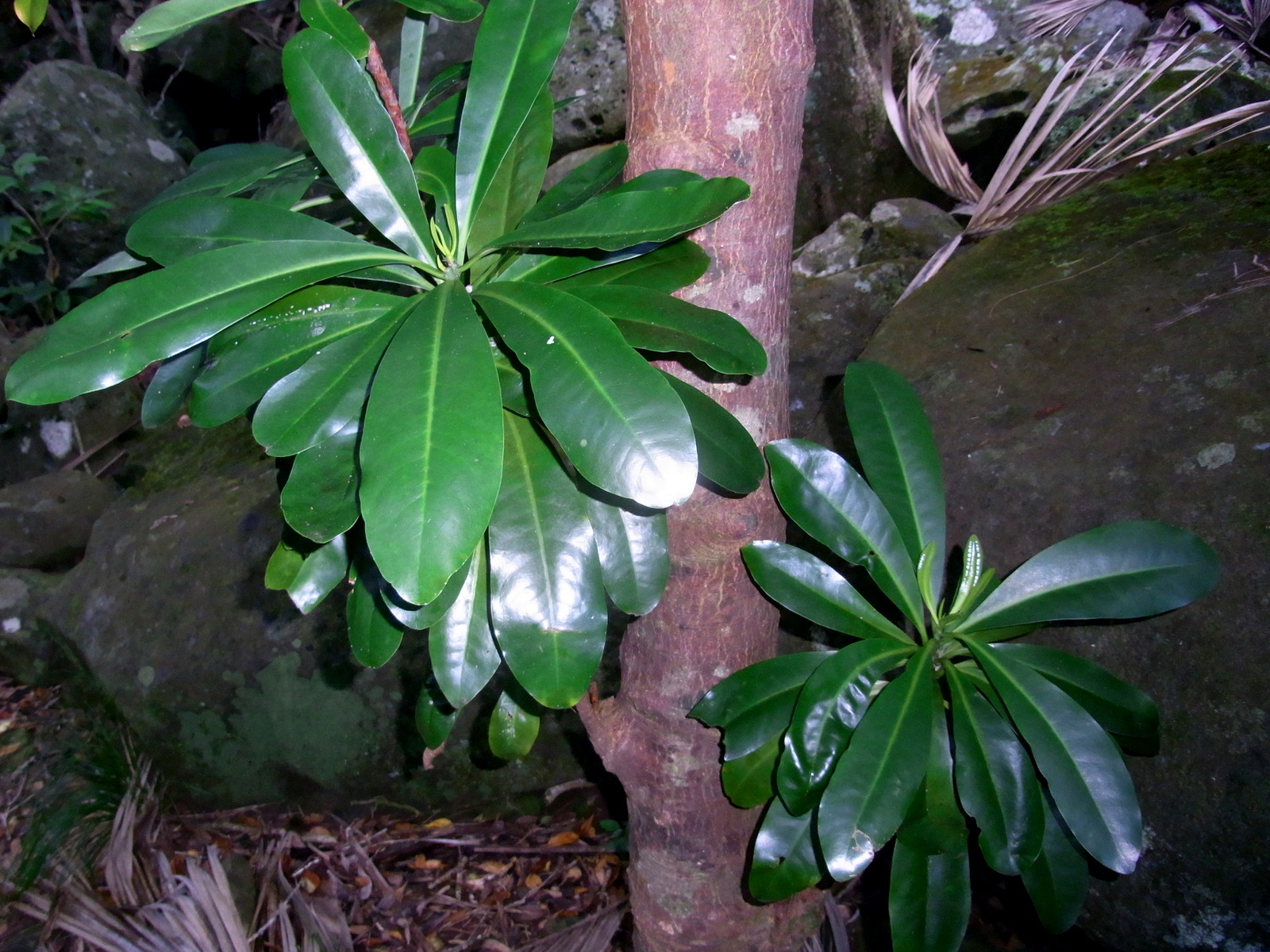

Scientific classification
- Kingdom: Plantae
- Clade: Tracheophytes
- Clade: Angiosperms
- Clade: Magnoliids
- Order: Canellales
- Family: Winteraceae
- Genus: Zygogynum
- Species: Z. howeanum

Binomial name
- Zygogynum howeanum (F.Muell.) Vink

Synonyms
- Bubbia howeana (F.Muell.) Tiegh.; Bubbia muelleri Tiegh.; Drimys howeana F.Muell.

= Zygogynum howeanum =

Species of flowering plant

Zygogynum howeanum, commonly known as hotbark or hot bark, is a species of plant in the family Winteraceae. It is endemic to Australia’s subtropical Lord Howe Island in the Tasman Sea. The specific epithet refers to the locality.

== Description ==
Hotbark is a tree that grows to 13 m in height. It has a dark, smooth trunk. Its large, bluntly pointed leaves are dark green on the upper surface and paler beneath. The white flowers are 20 mm in diameter, flowering from June to December, and are insect-pollinated. The fruit is a round black berry, 8 mm across, containing 5–15 small seeds.

== Distribution and habitat ==
Occurring mainly in moist and sheltered parts of the forests of Lord Howe's southern mountains – Mounts Gower and Lidgbird – the species forms a distinctive component of the vegetation from sea level to the peaks. Small numbers also occur elsewhere on the island. Within its restricted range it is common and locally abundant.
