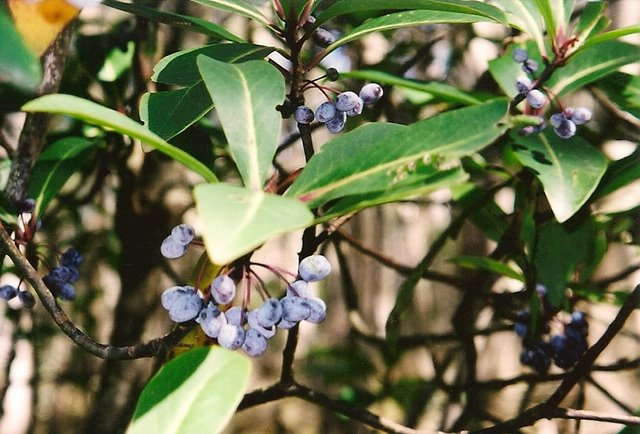
- Tasmannia purpurascens near Mount Barrington, Australia

Scientific classification
- Kingdom: Plantae
- Clade: Tracheophytes
- Clade: Angiosperms
- Clade: Magnoliids
- Order: Canellales
- Family: Winteraceae
- Genus: Tasmannia
- Species: T. purpurascens

Binomial name
- Tasmannia purpurascens (Vickery) A.C.Sm.

Synonyms
- Drimys purpurascens (Vickery)

= Tasmannia purpurascens =

Broad-leaved pepperbush

Species of shrub

Tasmannia purpurascens, commonly known as the broad-leaved pepperbush, is a shrub in the primitive family Winteraceae and is only found growing in the Barrington Tops and Ben Halls Gap regions of New South Wales. It is locally abundant in a restricted subalpine habitat with high rainfall, often growing in the ecotone in association with Antarctic beech.

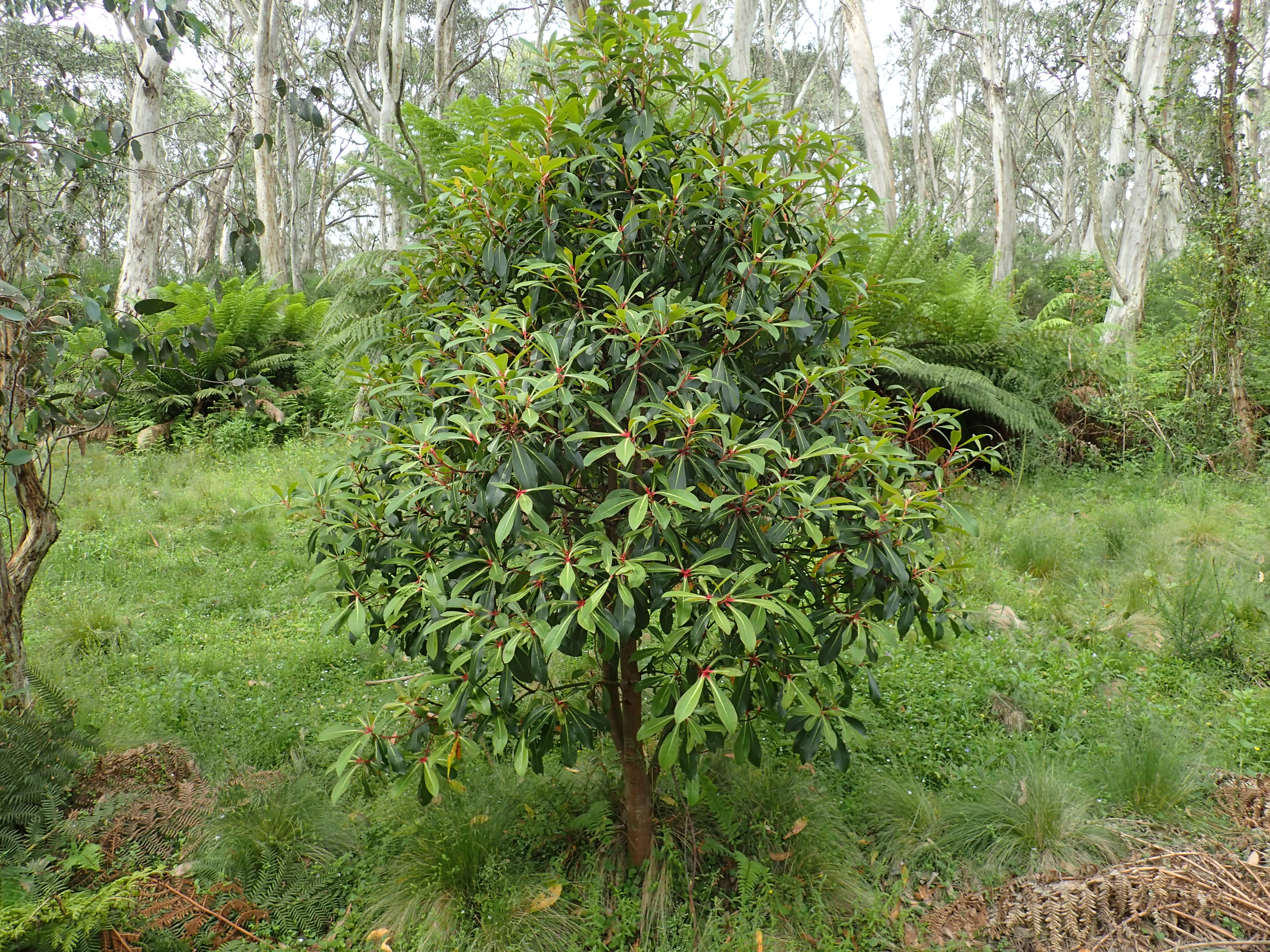
Tasmannia purpurascens habit, in the Barrington Tops National Park

== Description ==
Tasmannia purpurascens usually grows to a height of 1–3 m (3–10 ft) with a woody stem, purplish new growth and branchlets. The leaves are egg-shaped with a rounded tip, mostly 8–18 cm (3–7 in) long and 30–50 mm (1–2 in) wide. They are glabrous with a purplish base, lack a distinct petiole and have a raised midrib on the lower surface. Creamy-white flowers about 25 mm (1 in) wide and arranged in umbels appear in November. The flowers are either male or female but occur on the same plant. There are two petals 8–12 mm (0.3–0.5 in) long and female flowers have an ovary about 2 mm (0.08 in) long. Fleshy, purplish-black, oval-shaped berries around 10–15 mm (0.4–0.6 in) long are seen around Easter time.

== Taxonomy and naming ==
The broad-leaved pepperbush was first formally described in 1937 by Joyce Vickery who gave it the name Drimys purpurascens and published the description in Proceedings of the Linnean Society of New South Wales. In 1969, Albert Smith transferred the species to Tasmannia based on its chromosome number of 13, compared to 43 in most others in Drimys. The specific epithet (purpurascens) is derived from the Latin word purpureus meaning "purple" with the suffix -escens meaning "becoming" referring to the reddish-purple base of the midvein.

The genus Tasmannia is of interest to scientists as these plants are some of the most primitive of all angiosperms. They have a primitive flowering structure and the wood is similar to that of conifers, in that it lacks vessels.

In common with other members of the genus, it is sometimes known as "pepperbush" because of the spicy fruits and seeds which have been used to flavour food.

== Distribution and habitat ==
Tasmannia purpurascens grows in forests with Antarctic beech and eucalypt species, at altitudes of 1,200–1,520 m (4,000–5,000 ft). It is abundant in the Ben Halls Gap and Barrington Tops National Parks, growing where it sometimes snows and where frosts are common in winter.

== Conservation ==
Tasmannia purpurascens was previously listed as "Vulnerable" under the Environment Protection and Biodiversity Conservation Act 1999 but was delisted in 2013. It remains listed as "vulnerable" in New South Wales.

== Use in horticulture ==
This plant is difficult to propagate from seed but readily propagated from cuttings taken in early autumn. Its slow growth, attractive appearance and resistance to pests make it useful as an indoor plant.
