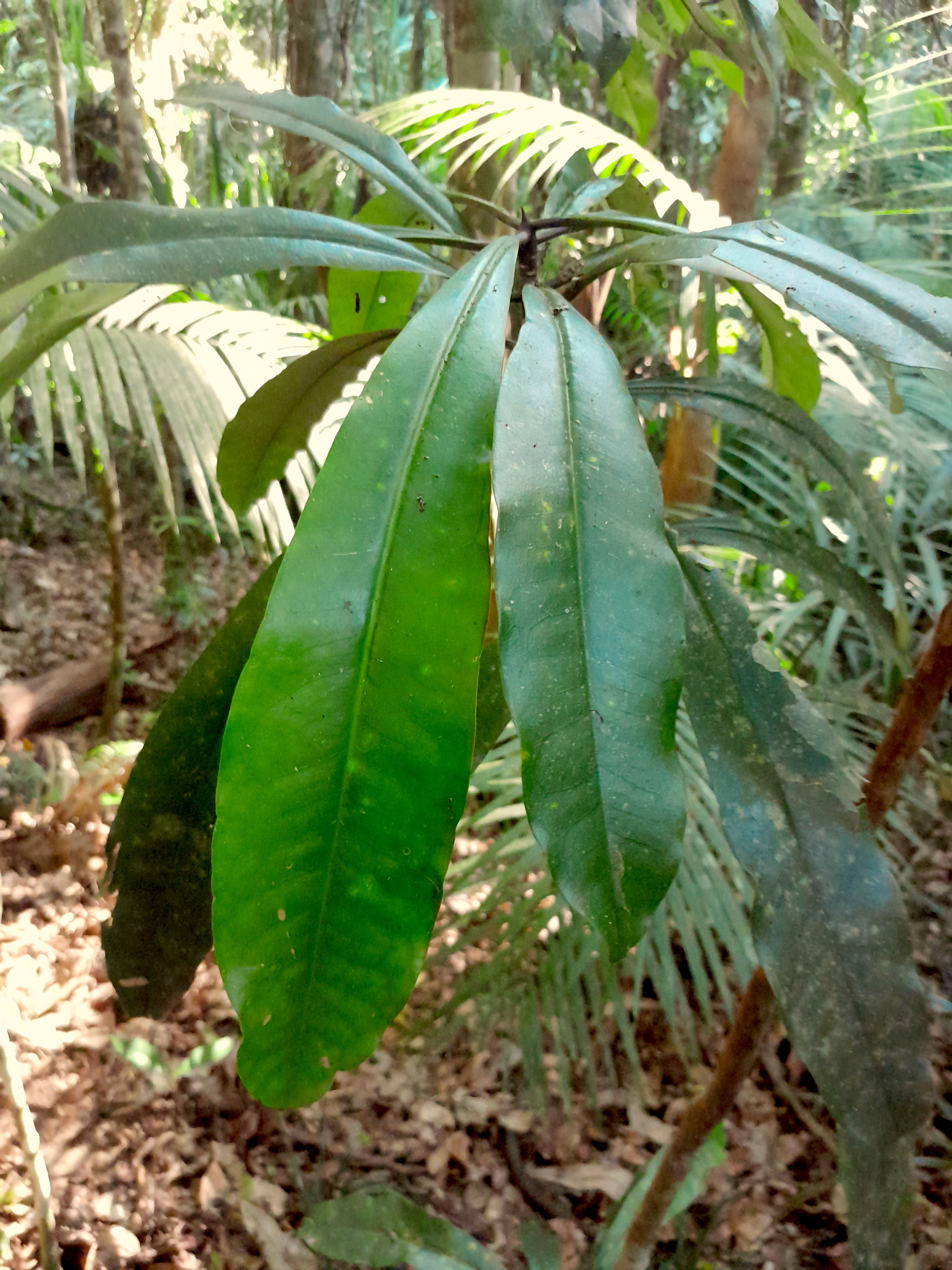
- In rainforest near Cairns

Conservation status
- Least Concern (NCA)

Scientific classification
- Kingdom: Plantae
- Clade: Tracheophytes
- Clade: Angiosperms
- Clade: Magnoliids
- Order: Canellales
- Family: Winteraceae
- Genus: Zygogynum
- Species: Z. semecarpoides

Binomial name
- Zygogynum semecarpoides (F.Muell.) Vink

= Zygogynum semecarpoides =

Australian pepper tree

Species of flowering plant

Zygogynum semecarpoides, commonly known as Australian pepper tree, is a species of plants in the family Winteraceae endemic to Queensland, Australia. The name Zygogynum semecarpoides is accepted by Plants of the World Online, however, it is not accepted in Australia. The Council of Heads of Australasian Herbaria, the Queensland Herbarium, and the publications Flora of Australia and Australian Tropical Rainforest Plants all recognise an earlier name, Bubbia semecarpoides.

== Conservation ==
This species is listed as least concern under the Queensland Government's Nature Conservation Act. As of 9 January 2025, it has not been assessed by the International Union for Conservation of Nature (IUCN).
