= Zygogynum tanyostigma =

Conservation status
- Endangered (IUCN 3.1)

Scientific classification
- Kingdom: Plantae
- Clade: Embryophytes
- Clade: Tracheophytes
- Clade: Spermatophytes
- Clade: Angiosperms
- Clade: Magnoliids
- Order: Canellales
- Family: Winteraceae
- Genus: Zygogynum
- Species: Z. tanyostigma

Binomial name
- Zygogynum tanyostigma Vink

Species of flowering plant

Zygogynum tanyostigma is a species of flowering plant in the family Winteraceae. It is an evergreen shrub endemic to New Caledonia.

It has been found in only two locations, on Mont Colnett and Mont Panié in the northeast of Grande Terre, New Caledonia's main island. It is found in high-elevation kauri forest undergrowth on volcanic and sedimentary substrate from 1,350 and 1,615 meters elevation.
