= Zygogynum cristatum =

Conservation status
- Vulnerable (IUCN 2.3)

Scientific classification
- Kingdom: Plantae
- Clade: Embryophytes
- Clade: Tracheophytes
- Clade: Spermatophytes
- Clade: Angiosperms
- Clade: Magnoliids
- Order: Canellales
- Family: Winteraceae
- Genus: Zygogynum
- Species: Z. cristatum

Binomial name
- Zygogynum cristatum Vink

Species of flowering plant

Zygogynum cristatum is a species of plant in the family Winteraceae. It is endemic to New Caledonia and is threatened by habitat loss.

== Distribution ==
The plant is found at only two upland locations, in the region of Kouaoua at Mé Ori and Aréha.

== Status and conservation ==
Major threats to the species include mining activities, fires and habitat clearance. Consequently, it is considered Vulnerable.
