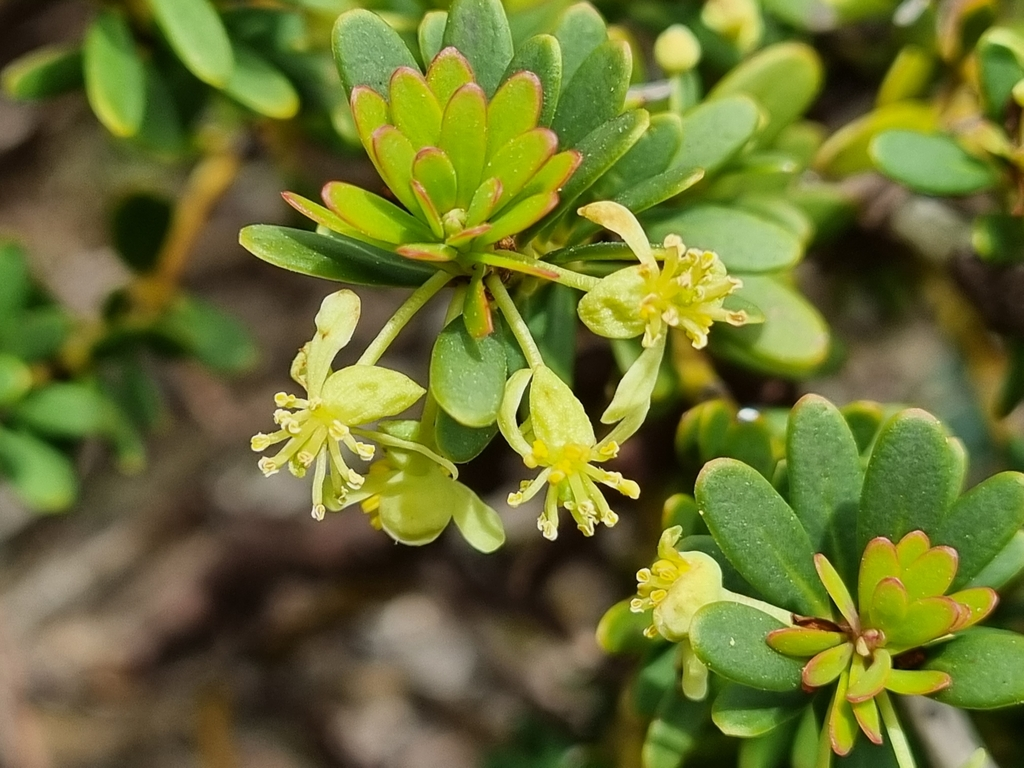
- Male flowers on Mount St Gwinear

Scientific classification
- Kingdom: Plantae
- Clade: Tracheophytes
- Clade: Angiosperms
- Clade: Magnoliids
- Order: Canellales
- Family: Winteraceae
- Genus: Tasmannia
- Species: T. vickeryana

Binomial name
- Tasmannia vickeryana (A.C.Sm.) A.C.Sm.

Synonyms
- Drimys aromatica var. alpina P.Parm. nom. inval., nom. nud.; Drimys lanceolata var. parvifolia Vickery; Drimys vickeryana A.C.Sm.; Drimys xerophila var. alpina F.Muell. ex P.Parm.

= Tasmannia vickeryana =

Species of flowering plant

Tasmannia vickeryana, commonly known as Baw Baw pepper, is a species of flowering plant in the family Winteraceae and is endemic to Victoria in Australia. It has narrowly lance-shaped leaves, sometimes with the narrower end towards the base, and male and female flowers on separate plants, the male flowers with 8 to 26 stamens and the female flowers with up to 5 carpels. The fruit is dark red and contains 2 to 5 seeds.

== Description ==
Tasmannia vickeryana is a shrub that typically grows to a height of 0.5–1.2 m (1 ft 8 in – 3 ft 11 in) and has reddish-brown branchlets. Its leaves are lance-shaped, sometimes with the narrower end towards the base, 8–20 mm (0.31–0.79 in) long and 2–6 mm (0.079–0.236 in) wide, on a petiole 1.5–3.5 mm (0.059–0.138 in) long. Male and female flowers are borne on separate plants and usually have 2 egg-shaped to oblong petals 2.5–3.0 mm (0.098–0.118 in) long and about 1 mm (0.039 in) wide. Male flowers are borne on a pedicel 3–8 mm (0.12–0.31 in) long and have 8 to 26 stamens, and female flowers are on a pedicel 3–6 mm (0.12–0.24 in) long with up to 6 carpels with 3 to 6 ovules. Flowering occurs in December and January and the fruit is a spherical to oval, dark red berry 6–12 mm (0.24–0.47 in) long with 2 to 5 seeds 2.3–3.0 mm (0.091–0.118 in) long.

== Taxonomy ==
This species was first described in 1943 by Albert Charles Smith who gave it the name Drimys vickeryana in the Journal of the Arnold Arboretum. In 1969, Smith transferred the species to Tasmannia as T. vickeryana in the journal Taxon.

== Distribution and habitat ==
Baw Baw pepper grows in snow gum woodland in the Baw Baw Range at altitudes between 1,300 and 1,500 m (4,300 and 4,900 ft).
