= Takhtajania =

- In habitat in Northern Madagascar

Conservation status
- Endangered (IUCN 3.1)

Scientific classification
- Kingdom: Plantae
- Clade: Tracheophytes
- Clade: Angiosperms
- Clade: Magnoliids
- Order: Canellales
- Family: Winteraceae
- Genus: Takhtajania; M.Baranova & J.-F.Leroy
- Species: T. perrieri

Binomial name
- Takhtajania perrieri Schatz

Synonyms
- Bubbia perrieri Capuron

Genus of flowering plants

Takhtajania is a genus of flowering plants of the family Winteraceae, which contains a single species, Takhtajania perrieri. It is endemic to Madagascar.

Takhtajania is found in a small area of the Madagascar subhumid forests. It is a small evergreen tree or shrub, with shiny green lance-shaped leaves and reddish-pink flowers.

The first known specimen of the plant was collected in 1909 on the Manongarivo Massif of central Madagascar at an elevation of 1700 meters. In 1963, the French botanist René Paul Raymond Capuron examined the unidentified plant sample, which he identified as a new species, which he named Bubbia perrieri, after the French botanist Henri Perrier de la Bâthie, classifying it in the Australasian Winteraceae genus Bubbia. In 1978, the botanists Baranova and J. F. Leroy reclassified the plant into its own genus, Takhtajania, after the Russian botanist Armen Takhtajan. It was published in Adansonia, n.s., Vol.17 on page 388. In 1994 Malagasy plant collector Fanja Rasoavimbahoaka collected a specimen in Anjahanaribe-Sud Special Reserve 150 km from the location at which the 1909 specimen was collected, which George E. Schatz identified in May 1997 as Takhtajania. A subsequent expedition discovered a large grove of the species at the spot where the second sample was collected.

Takhtajania lacks water-conducting cells, called vessels, which allow plants to withstand drought, and must have remained in moist conditions for millions of years.
