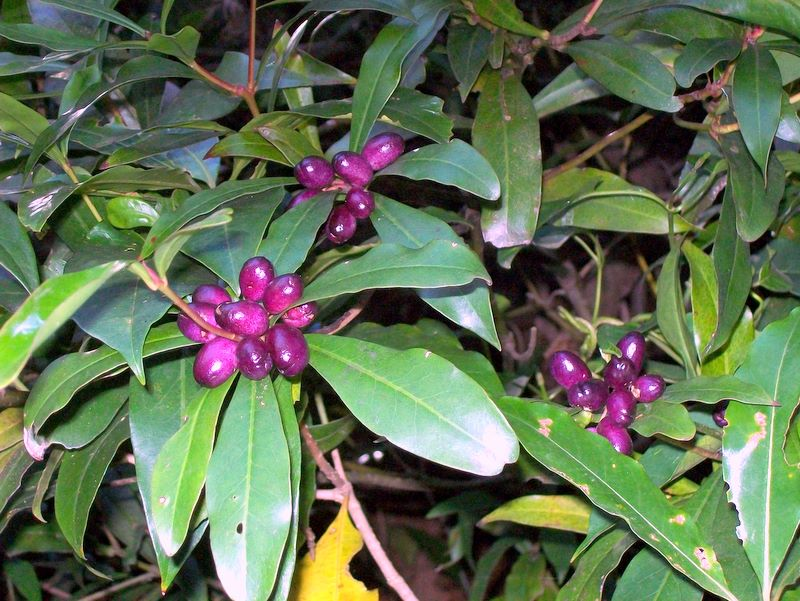
- Tasmannia insipida at Budderoo National Park, Australia

Scientific classification
- Kingdom: Plantae
- Clade: Tracheophytes
- Clade: Angiosperms
- Clade: Magnoliids
- Order: Canellales
- Family: Winteraceae
- Genus: Tasmannia
- Species: T. insipida

Binomial name
- Tasmannia insipida R.Br. ex DC.

Synonyms
- Drimys dipetala F.Muell. nom. illeg., nom. superfl.; Drimys insipida (R.Br. ex DC.) Tiegh.; Drimys insipida (R.Br. ex DC.) Druce isonym; Drimys insipida (R.Br. ex DC.) Domin isonym; Tasmannia dipetala DC. nom. illeg., nom. superfl.; Tasmannia monticola A.Rich.

= Tasmannia insipida =

Species of shrub

Tasmannia insipida, commonly known as brush pepperbush, Dorrigo pepper, pepper bush, pepper tree or faint pepper bush, is a species of flowering plant in the family Winteraceae, and is endemic to eastern Australia. It is a shrub or small tree with lance-shaped or egg-shaped leaves the narrower end towards the base, the flowers male and female flowers on separate plants, male flowers with 17 to 65 stamens, female flowers with a single carpel with 15-40 ovules, and the fruit a purplish berry.

== Description ==
Tasmannia insipida is a shrub or small tree that typically grows to a height of 1.5–6 m (4 ft 11 in – 19 ft 8 in) and has smooth branchlets. The leaves are paper-like, lance-shaped to egg-shaped with the narrower end towards the base, 80–200 mm (3.1–7.9 in) long and 15–55 mm (0.59–2.17 in) wide on petiole 1–4 mm (0.039–0.157 in) long. Male and female flowers are borne on separate plants, male flowers on a pedicel 8–50 mm (0.31–1.97 in) long, the petals 6.5–14.5 mm (0.26–0.57 in) long with 17 to 65 stamens. Female flowers are borne on a pedicel 8–29 mm (0.31–1.14 in) long, the petals 5–10 mm (0.20–0.39 in) long with a single carpel with 15 to 40 ovules. Flowering occurs from August to November and the fruit is a purplish berry, 12–20 mm (0.47–0.79 in) long, containing 8 to 27 seeds 3–4 mm (0.12–0.16 in) long and 1.7–2.5 mm (0.067–0.098 in) wide.

== Taxonomy ==
Tasmannia insipida was first formally described in 1817 by Augustin Pyramus de Candolle in his Regni Vegetabilis Systema Naturale from an unpublished description by Robert Brown from specimens collected near Port Jackson. The specific epithet (insipida) means "taseless" or "insipid", presumably referring to the flavour of the seeds.

== Distribution ==
Tasmannia insipida can be found in the cool wet forests or coasts of eastern Australia, from Moruya on the southern coast of New South Wales to the area around Rossville in northern Queensland.
