= Drimys roraimensis =

Conservation status
- Least Concern (IUCN 3.1)

Scientific classification
- Kingdom: Plantae
- Clade: Embryophytes
- Clade: Tracheophytes
- Clade: Spermatophytes
- Clade: Angiosperms
- Clade: Magnoliids
- Order: Canellales
- Family: Winteraceae
- Genus: Drimys
- Species: D. roraimensis

Binomial name
- Drimys roraimensis (A.C.Sm.) Ehrend., Silberb.-Gottsb. & Gottsb.

Synonyms
- Drimys brasiliensis var. roraimensis A.C.Sm.; Drimys brasiliensis var. ptaritepuiensis Steyerm.

Species of flowering plant

Drimys roraimensis is a broadleaf evergreen tree of family Winteraceae. it is native to the tepuis, flat-topped mountains in southern Venezuela and western Guyana.

== Range and habitat ==
Drimys roraimensis is endemic to montane cloud forests of the tepuis, where it is found on mountain slopes, along streams, and in swamps between 1,800 and 2,500 meters elevation.

The species' estimated extent of occurrence (EOO) is estimated as 357,372 km^{2}. The estimated area of occupancy is 140 km^{2}, which is likely an under-estimate because of the low number of collections.
