= Drimys angustifolia =

Conservation status
- Least Concern (IUCN 3.1)

Scientific classification
- Kingdom: Plantae
- Clade: Embryophytes
- Clade: Tracheophytes
- Clade: Spermatophytes
- Clade: Angiosperms
- Clade: Magnoliids
- Order: Canellales
- Family: Winteraceae
- Genus: Drimys
- Species: D. angustifolia

Binomial name
- Drimys angustifolia Miers

Synonyms
- Drimys brasiliensis var. angustifolia (Miers) A.C.Sm.; Drimys winteri f. angustifolia (Miers) Eichler

Species of flowering plant

Drimys angustifolia is a species of flowering plant in family Winteraceae. It is a shrub or small tree native to the mountains of southern Brazil.

== Description ==
Drimys angustifolia is an evergreen shrub or small tree, typically growing from 2 to 4, and occasionally to 6, meters tall.

Its leaves are narrowly elliptic or oblong to linear-lanceolate, typically 45 to 70 mm long by 8 to 15 mm wide, and occasionally up to 100 mm long and 25 mm wide.

It flowers in January and February. The flowers are small and white, often single, more rarely 2 or 3 on short peduncles of 1–3 mm, with linear lanceolate petals 7–9 mm long and with 2–5 carpels.

== Range and habitat ==
Drimys angustifolia is endemic to southern Brazil, in the states of Santa Catarina and Rio Grande do Sul. It is found in subtropical montane shrubland on rocky or shallow soils between 800 and 1,400 meters elevation.
