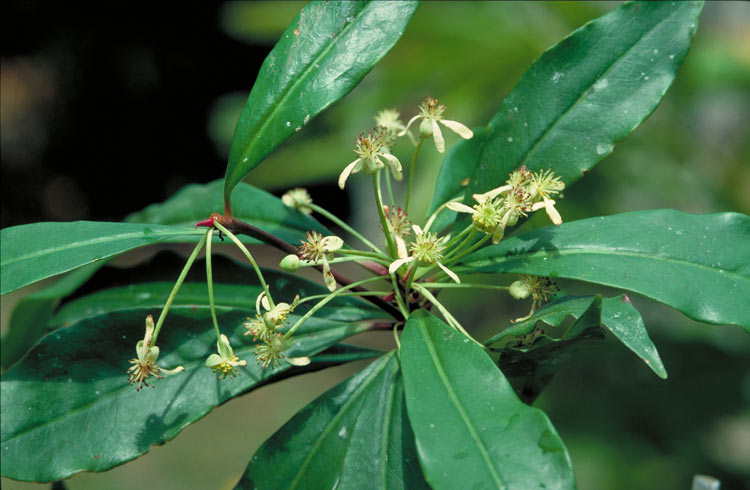
- Male flowers

Scientific classification
- Kingdom: Plantae
- Clade: Tracheophytes
- Clade: Angiosperms
- Clade: Magnoliids
- Order: Canellales
- Family: Winteraceae
- Genus: Tasmannia
- Species: T. membranea

Binomial name
- Tasmannia membranea (F.Muell.) A.C.Sm.

Synonyms
- Drimys membranacea F.M.Bailey orth. var.; Drimys membranea F.Muell.; Drimys piperita entity 38 'membranea' Vink

= Tasmannia membranea =

Species of shrub

Tasmannia membranea, commonly known as pepper tree, is a species of flowering plant in the family Winteraceae, and is endemic to north-eastern Queensland. It is a shrub or tree with lance-shaped or egg-shaped leaves, male and female flowers on separate plants, with two petals on each flower. The male flowers have 30 to 62 stamens, and the female flowers have a single carpel with 14 to 36 ovules, and the fruit is black.

== Description ==
Tasmannia membranea is a shrub or tree that typically grows to a height of 1.5–4 m (4 ft 11 in – 13 ft 1 in) and has striated, reddish branchlets. Its leaves are egg-shaped with the narrower end toward the base or lance-shaped, 80–170 mm (3.1–6.7 in) long and 9–40 mm (0.35–1.57 in) wide on a petiole 1–13 mm (0.039–0.512 in) long. Male and female flowers are borne on separate plants, each flower with 2 petals. Male flowers are borne on a pedicel 7–36 mm (0.28–1.42 in) long and have 30–62 stamens. Female flowers are on a pedicel 6–23 mm (0.24–0.91 in) long with a single sessile carpel containing 14 to 36 ovules. Flowering occurs from June to October and the fruit is black, spherical or oval, 10–11 mm (0.39–0.43 in) long with 4 to 7, slightly curved seeds 3.0–3.5 mm (0.12–0.14 in) long.

== Taxonomy ==
This species was first formally described in 1866 by Ferdinand von Mueller, who gave it the name Drimys membranea in his Fragmenta phytographiae Australiae from specimens collected by John Dallachy. In 1969, Albert Charles Smith transferred the species to Tasmannia as T. membranea in journal Taxon.

== Distribution and habitat ==
Tasmannia membranea grows in the understorey of rainforest at altitudes between 300 and 1,550 m (980 and 5,090 ft) from near Rossville to Paluma in north-eastern Queensland.

== Conservation status ==
This species of Tasmannia is listed as of "least concern" by the Queensland Government, Department of Education and Science.
