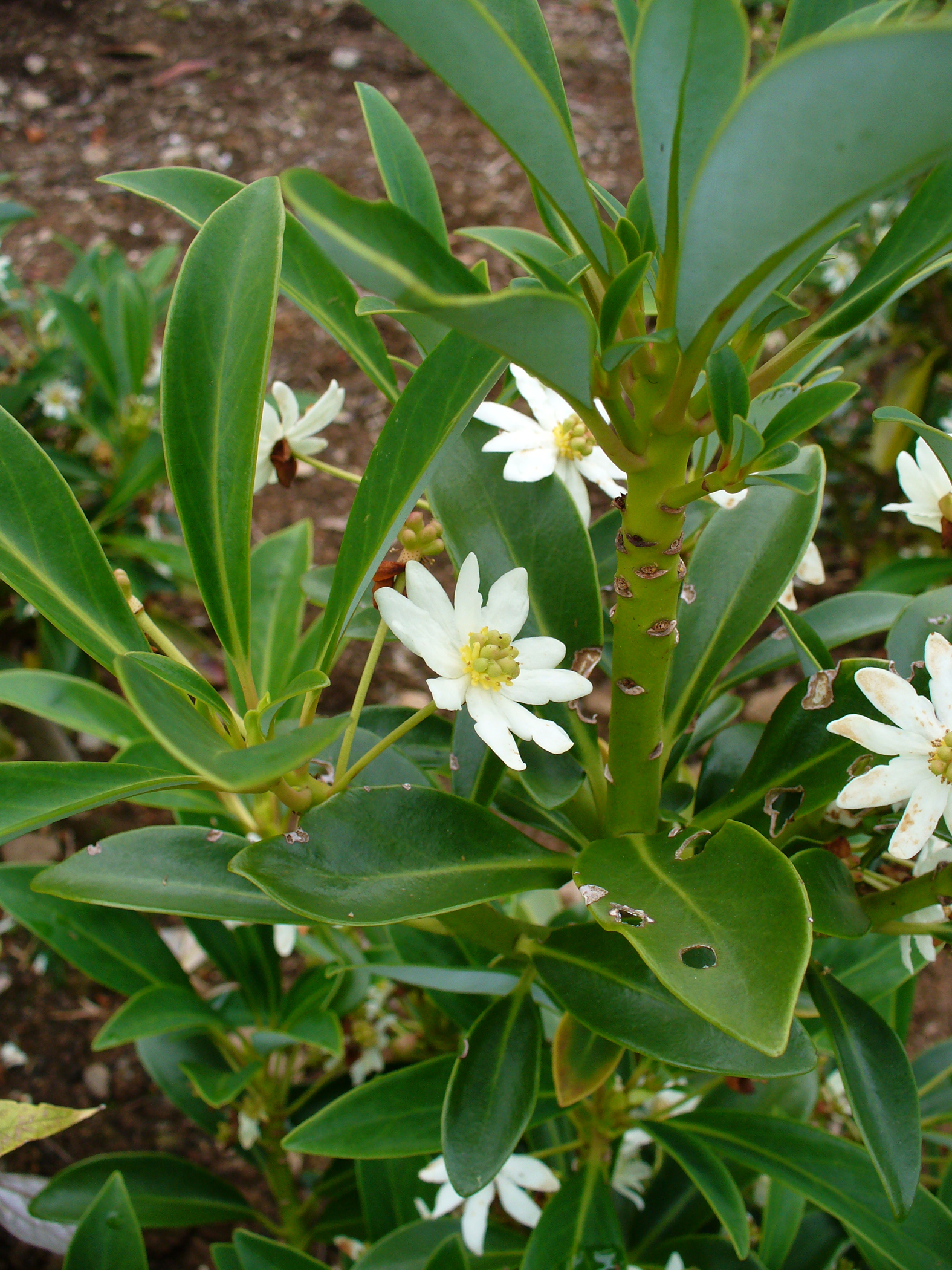

Scientific classification
- Kingdom: Plantae
- Clade: Tracheophytes
- Clade: Angiosperms
- Clade: Magnoliids
- Order: Canellales
- Family: Winteraceae
- Genus: Drimys
- Species: D. andina

Binomial name
- Drimys andina (Reiche) R.A.Rodr. & Quezada

Synonyms
- Drimys winteri var. andina Reiche; Drimys winteri f. andina (Reiche) Hauman; Drimys winteri var. quinoensis Kuntze

= Drimys andina =

Species of flowering plant

Drimys andina is a species of flowering plant in family Winteraceae. It is native to Chile and Argentina in southern South America.

== Description ==
Drimys andina is an evergreen shrub, which grows from 0.5 to one meter tall and broad. The leaves are long, oval, and leathery. It flowers in summer, with white, star-shaped scented flowers growing in terminal clusters.

== Range and habitat ==
Drimys andina is native to central and southern Chile and southern Argentina. It is found in sub-alpine and sub-antarctic forests from 37°43’ to 41°34’ south latitude.
