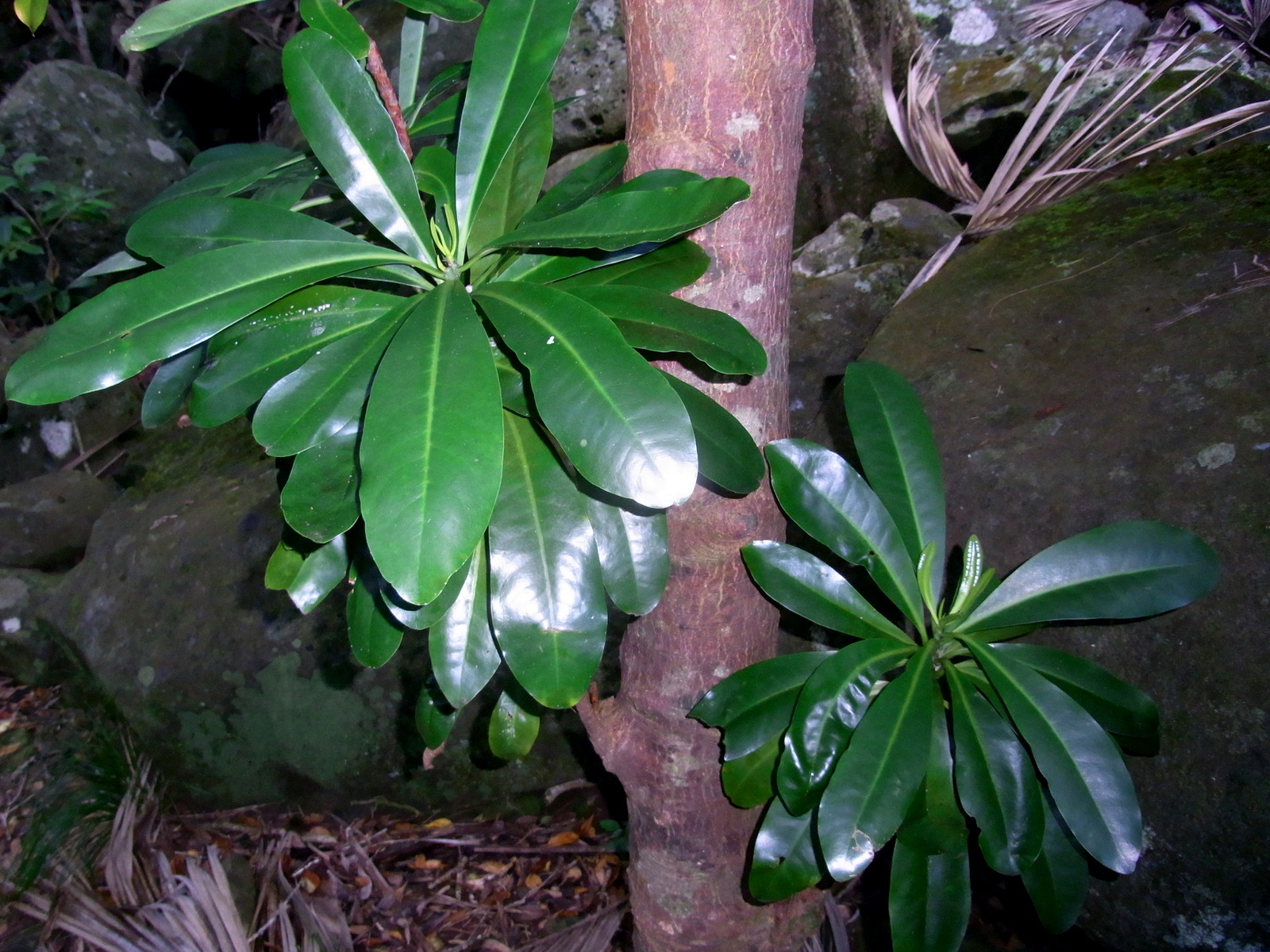
- Zygogynum howeanum

Scientific classification
- Kingdom: Plantae
- Clade: Tracheophytes
- Clade: Angiosperms
- Clade: Magnoliids
- Order: Canellales
- Family: Winteraceae
- Genus: Zygogynum; Baill.

Type species
- Zygogynum vieillardii Baill.

Synonyms
- Belliolum Tiegh.; Bubbia Tiegh.; Exospermum Tiegh.; Tetrathalamus Lauterb.

= Zygogynum =

Genus of flowering plants

Zygogynum is a genus of plants in the family Winteraceae with 47 species as of October 2024. They are native to areas from Borneo through New Guinea and Queensland to New Caledonia, with 22 species in New Guinea. Initially, the genus was thought to be endemic to New Caledonia, but in 1985 Willem Vink transferred the related genera Bubbia and Exospermum to Zygogynum, thus extending the range westward. More recently, new species have been identified and described which again extends the range of the genus such that it now includes Borneo. It is one of the few angiosperm genera in which the wood lacks xylem vessels.

== Description ==
Plants in this genus are evergreen shrubs or small trees, leaves are alternate, undivided, and hairless; they may have a peppery taste. Inflorescences are terminal and have 1–150 flowers. Petals number from 4 to 30, stamens from 3 to 370, carpels from 1 to 50.

== Distribution and habitat ==
The genus occurs in Borneo, the Maluku Islands, New Guinea, the Bismarck Archipelago, Solomon Islands, Norfolk Island, and the Australian state of Queensland. They occupy wet forests at altitudes from sea level to 3,600 m (11,800 ft).

== Species ==
As of October 2024, Plants of the World Online recognises the following 47 species:

- Zygogynum acsmithii Vink
- Zygogynum amplexicaule (Vieill. ex P.Parm.) Vink
- Zygogynum archboldianum (A.C.Sm.) Vink
- Zygogynum argenteum (A.C.Sm.) Vink
- Zygogynum baillonii Tiegh.
- Zygogynum bicolor Tiegh.
- Zygogynum bosavicum Vink
- Zygogynum bullatum (Diels) Vink
- Zygogynum calophyllum (A.C.Sm.) Vink
- Zygogynum calothyrsum (Diels) Vink
- Zygogynum clemensiae (A.C.Sm.) Vink
- Zygogynum comptonii (Baker f.) Vink
- Zygogynum crassifolium (Baill.) Vink
- Zygogynum cristatum Vink
- Zygogynum cruminatum Vink
- Zygogynum cyclopensis Vink
- Zygogynum fraterculus Vink
- Zygogynum haplopus (B.L.Burtt) Vink
- Zygogynum howeanum (F.Muell.) Vink
- Zygogynum ledermannii (Diels) Vink
- Zygogynum longifolium (A.C.Sm.) Vink
- Zygogynum mackeei Vink
- Zygogynum megacarpum (A.C.Sm.) Vink
- Zygogynum moluccanum Utteridge & Rustiami
- Zygogynum montanum (Lauterb.) Vink
- Zygogynum oligocarpum (Schltr.) Vink
- Zygogynum oligostigma Vink
- Zygogynum pachyanthum (A.C.Sm.) Vink
- Zygogynum pancheri (Baill.) Vink
- Zygogynum pauciflorum (Baker f.) Vink
- Zygogynum polyneurum (Diels) Vink
- Zygogynum pomiferum Baill.
- Zygogynum queenslandianum (Vink) Vink
- Zygogynum schlechteri (Guillaumin) Vink
- Zygogynum schramii Vink
- Zygogynum semecarpoides (F.Muell.) Vink
- Zygogynum sororium (Diels) Vink
- Zygogynum staufferianum Vink
- Zygogynum stipitatum Baill.
- Zygogynum sundaicum Utteridge
- Zygogynum sylvestre (A.C.Sm.) Vink
- Zygogynum tanyostigma Vink
- Zygogynum tieghemii Vink
- Zygogynum umbellatum (Ridl.) Vink
- Zygogynum vieillardii Baill.
- Zygogynum vinkii F.B.Sampson
- Zygogynum whitmoreanum Vink
