= Drimys brasiliensis =

Scientific classification
- Kingdom: Plantae
- Clade: Tracheophytes
- Clade: Angiosperms
- Clade: Magnoliids
- Order: Canellales
- Family: Winteraceae
- Genus: Drimys
- Species: D. brasiliensis

Binomial name
- Drimys brasiliensis Miers

Species of flowering plant

Drimys brasiliensis is a species of broadleaf evergreen trees of the family Winteraceae. It is native to Northeast Argentina, Bolivia, Brazil, and Paraguay.

== Description ==
Drimys brasiliensis is an evergreen shrub or small tree. It grows from 2 to eight meters high, with a dense rounded crown. It has a short cylindrical bole up to 30 to 40 cm in diameter. It has white flowers. It typically grows as a shrub in the northern, tropical part of its range, and can grow taller and more tree-like in the southern, sub-tropical portion of its range.

== Range and habitat ==
Drimys brasiliensis grows in eastern Brazil, ranging from the northeast to the southeast, along with the adjacent areas of western Paraguay and northeastern Argentina (Misiones Province). It is also found in Bolivia. It is characteristic of the Atlantic Forest, generally found in highlands in the northern tropical portion of the range, and at lower elevations in the subtropical south. It is found in rain forest, dryland forest, and savanna habitats. It is a common canopy tree in the montane cloud forests of the Serra do Mar coastal forests of southeastern Brazil.

== Subspecies ==
Three subspecies are recognized:

- Drimys brasiliensis subsp. brasiliensis
- Drimys brasiliensis subsp. subalpina Ehrend., Silberb.-Gottsb. & Gottsb.
- Drimys brasiliensis subsp. sylvatica (A.St.-Hil.) Ehrend., Silberb.-Gottsb. & Gottsb.

== Uses ==
The bark is aromatic, with antiscorbutic, antispasmodic, astringent, diaphoretic, stomachic, and tonic properties. It is used to treat intestinal colic and various other digestive disorders and chronic catarrh. The wood is easily-worked, moderately heavy, and fragrant. It has low durability when exposed to elements, and is used for interior carpentry, boxes, etc. The wood is also used for fuel and to make charcoal.
