= Menegazzia inactiva =

Conservation status
- Nationally Critical (NZ TCS)

Scientific classification
- Kingdom: Fungi
- Division: Ascomycota
- Class: Lecanoromycetes
- Order: Lecanorales
- Family: Parmeliaceae
- Genus: Menegazzia
- Species: M. inactiva

Binomial name
- Menegazzia inactiva P.James & Kantvilas (1987)

Species of lichen

Menegazzia inactiva is a rare species of foliose lichen found in Australia and New Zealand.

== Taxonomy ==
Menegazzia inactiva was described by Peter James and Gintaras Kantvilas in 1987. The type locality of this species is in north-west Tasmania, south of Arthur River near Sumac Road. The type specimen is held at the herbarium of the Tasmanian Museum and Art Gallery.

== Description ==
Menegazzia inactiva is a foliose lichen with irregular, branching lobes growing up to 10 cm across. The upper surface is pale grey or greenish-grey, with sparse perforations which have a distinct rim. The thallus is brittle and fragile, and the ends of the lobes curve upwards from the substrate. Soreida are whitish to pale greenish-grey, floury or granular in texture and found in ragged soralia.

This species is closely related to M. abscondita, and the two species can only be reliably distinguished by chemical means.

== Distribution and habitat ==
Menegazzia inactiva has only been found in western Tasmania and the South Island of New Zealand. This lichen was originally collected from Tasmannia lanceolata in rainforest at an elevation of 170 m. It is found in cool temperate rainforest, wet eucalypt forest and wet scrub at low altitudes. It grows on twigs and smooth-barked branches of a number of tree species including Lagarostrobos franklinii, Phyllocladus aspleniifolius and Nothofagus menziesii.

== Conservation status ==
Menegazzia inactiva was locally abundant at the type locality when it was first collected in 1980, but the area was logged during the 1980s and it has not been found in the area since. Although it has been found in other locations since, it is uncommon and localised, and only small, fragmentary thalli have been found.

This lichen was first added to the list of New Zealand's threatened species in 2012 with the classification "Nationally Critical" and the qualifiers "Data Poor", "One Location" and Threatened Overseas". It was listed on the basis of its very small population size but there were no active threats. In November 2018 the New Zealand Department of Conservation classified M. inactiva as "Nationally Critical" with the qualifiers "Data Poor" and "Threatened Overseas" under the New Zealand Threat Classification System. It met the criteria for "Nationally Critical" on the basis there being a single New Zealand population with a total area of occupancy of less than 10 ha.
