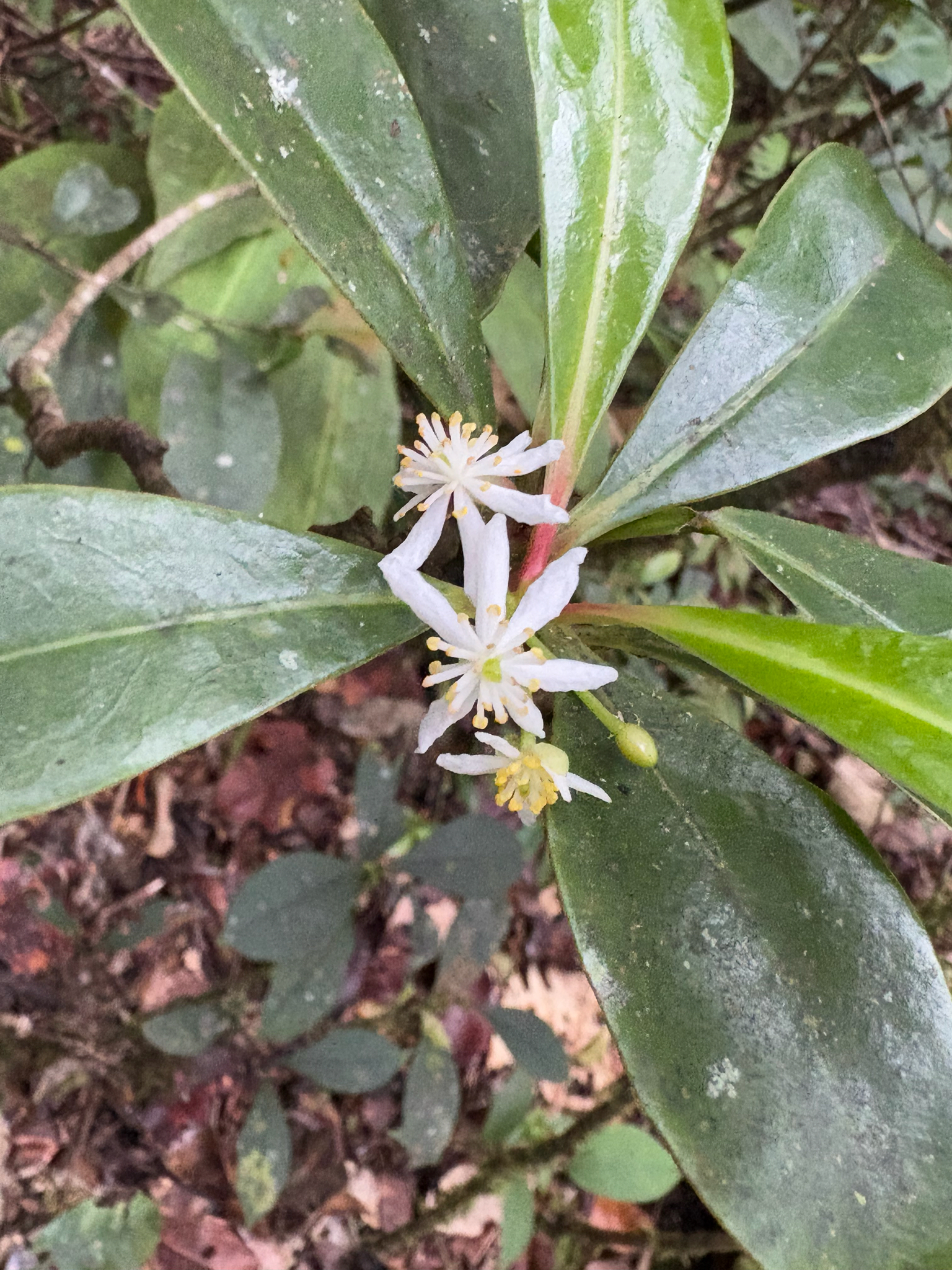

Conservation status
- Least Concern (IUCN 3.1)

Scientific classification
- Kingdom: Plantae
- Clade: Embryophytes
- Clade: Tracheophytes
- Clade: Spermatophytes
- Clade: Angiosperms
- Clade: Magnoliids
- Order: Canellales
- Family: Winteraceae
- Genus: Tasmannia
- Species: T. piperita

Binomial name
- Tasmannia piperita (Hook.f.) Miers

Synonyms
- 6 synonyms: Drimys piperita Hook.f.; Drimys angiensis Kaneh. & Hatus.; Drimys buxifolia Ridl.; Drimys piperita var. apetala Vink; Drimys piperita var. membranea Vink; Drimys piperita var. xerophylla Vink; Drimys reducta Diels; Drimys versteegii Diels; Tasmannia buxifolia (Ridl.) A.C.Sm.

= Tasmannia piperita =

Species of shrub

Tasmannia piperita is a species of shrub or small tree belonging to the family (Winteraceae) and native to Borneo, the Philippines, Sulawesi, the Maluku Islands, Lesser Sunda Islands, New Guinea and the Solomon Islands. It is the most widespread species of Tasmannia and the only one occurring outside of Australia.
