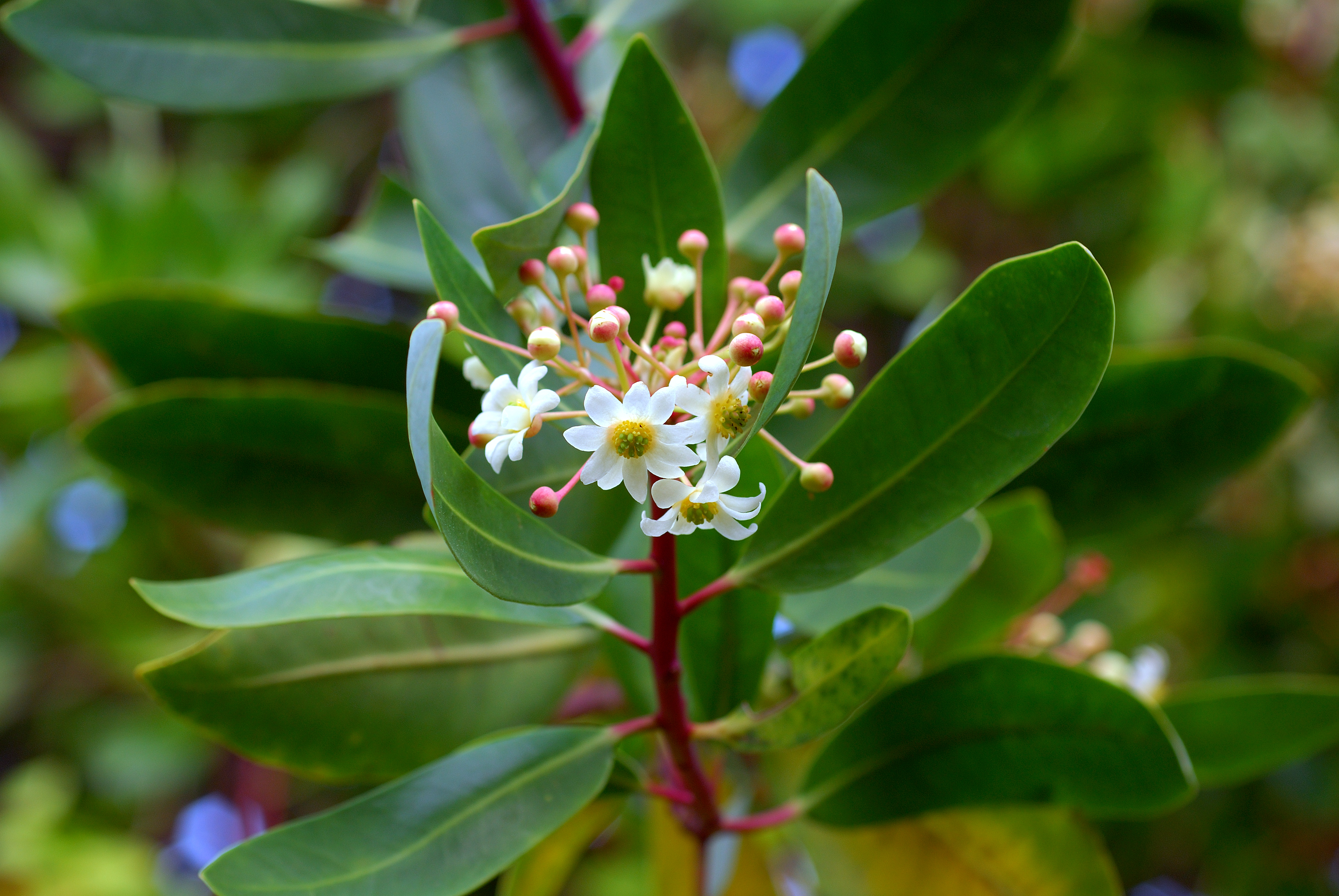
- Drimys winteri flowers

Scientific classification
- Kingdom: Plantae
- Clade: Tracheophytes
- Clade: Angiosperms
- Clade: Magnoliids
- Order: Canellales
- Family: Winteraceae
- Genus: Drimys; J.R.Forst. & G.Forst.

Species
- See text

= Drimys =

Genus of flowering plants

Drimys is a genus of seven species of woody evergreen flowering plants, in the family Winteraceae. The species are native to the Neotropics, ranging from southern Mexico to the southern tip of South America. They are primitive dicots, associated with the humid temperate Antarctic flora of the Southern Hemisphere, which evolved millions of years ago on the ancient supercontinent of Gondwana. Members of the family generally have aromatic bark and leaves, and some are used to extract essential oils.

== Species ==
Seven species are currently accepted.

- Drimys andina (Reiche) R.A.Rodr. & Quez. (syn. D. winteri var. andina) – southern and central Chile and adjacent Argentina
- Drimys angustifolia Miers – southern Brazil
- Drimys brasiliensis Miers – eastern and southern Brazil, northeastern Argentina, Paraguay, and Bolivia
- Drimys confertifolia Phil. – Juan Fernández Islands
- Drimys granadensis L.f. – southern Mexico south to Peru
- Drimys roraimensis (A.C.Sm.) Ehrend., Silberb.-Gottsb. & Gottsb. – southern Venezuela and northern Brazil, possibly western Guyana
- Drimys winteri J.R.Forst. & G.Forst. – southern and central Chile, southwestern Argentina

D. confertifolia is endemic to the Juan Fernández Islands, 670 km off the Chilean coast, where it forms a dominant tree in the tall lowland forests and lower montane forests of the islands.

The genus formerly included a number of species from Australasia, including Tasmanian pepper (D. lanceolata). Recent botanical studies have led to a growing consensus of botanists to split the genus into two, with the Neotropical species remaining in genus Drimys, and the Australasian species classified in genus Tasmannia.
