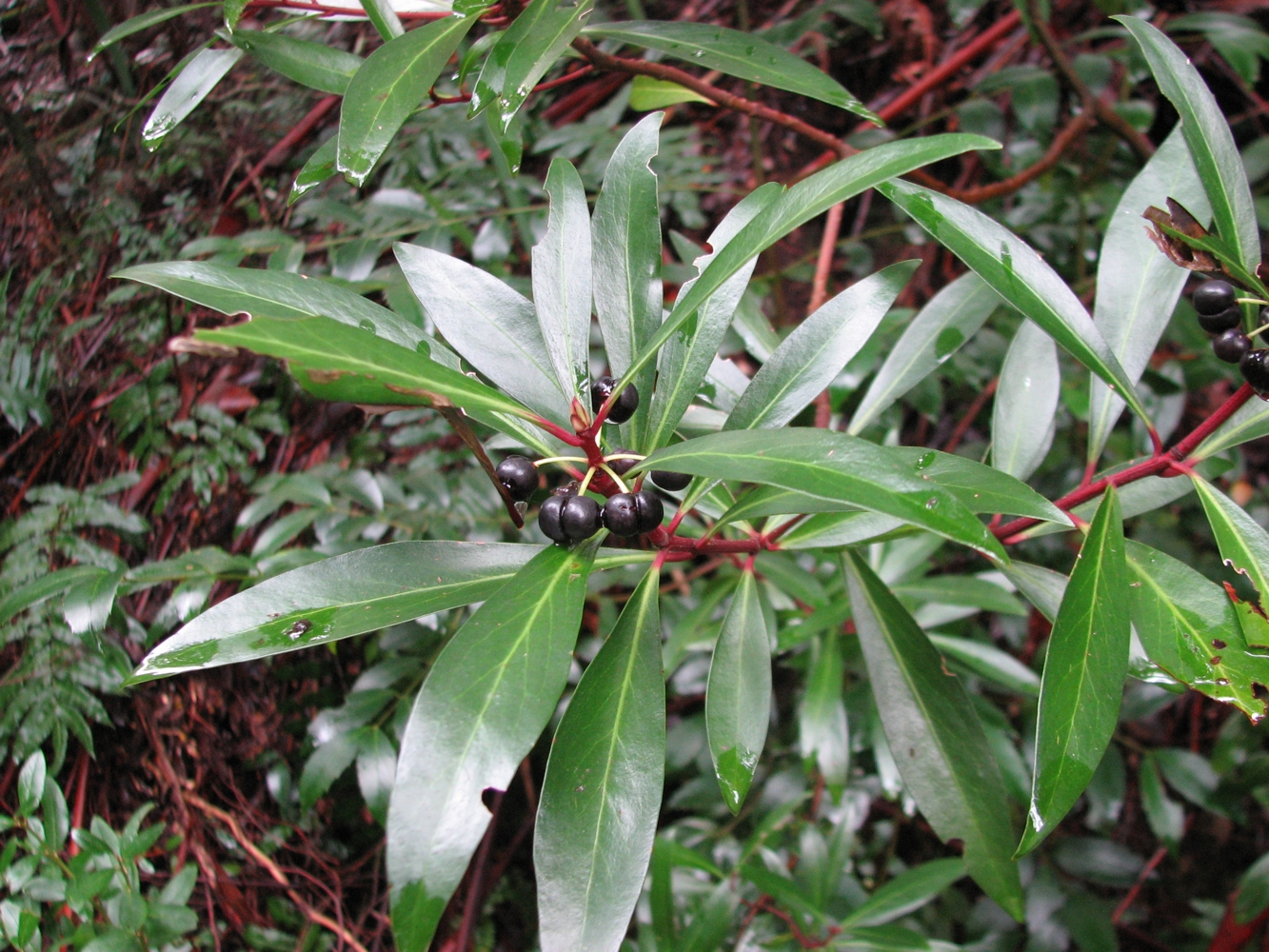
- Tasmannia lanceolata on Mount Donna Buang

Scientific classification
- Kingdom: Plantae
- Clade: Tracheophytes
- Clade: Angiosperms
- Clade: Magnoliids
- Order: Canellales
- Family: Winteraceae
- Genus: Tasmannia; R.Br. ex DC.

Synonyms
- Drimys sect. Tasmannia (R.Br. ex DC.) F.Muell.; Tasmania F.Muell. orth. var.

= Tasmannia =

Genus of flowering plants

Tasmannia is a genus of about 36 species of flowering plants in the family Winteraceae, and is native to Australia and New Guinea, with one species (Tasmannia piperita) also found in parts of Southeast Asia. Plants in the genus Tasmannia are shrubs or small trees, usually dioecious with simple leaves, mostly white, sometimes yellow flowers, and one to many clusters of berries.

== Description ==
Plants in the genus Tasmannia are shrubs or small trees that are usually dioecious, with simple, aromatic leaves arranged alternately along the branchlets, and have fine oil dots. There are no stipules. The flowers are usually white, sometimes yellow and arranged singly in the axils of bud scales, appearing like an umbel, later becoming like a whorl. The sepals are joined, completely enclosing the flower bud, later splitting into lobes. The fruit is a berry arranged singly or in clusters of up to 6.

== Taxonomy ==
The genus Tasmannia was first formally described by published by Augustin Pyramus de Candolle in his Regni Vegetabilis Systema Naturale, from an unpublished description by Robert Brown (botanist, born 1773).

The genus name, Tasmannia honours the Dutch explorer Abel Tasman.

The taxonomic status of, and evolutionary relationship between Tasmannia and Drimys has been the subject of controversy for many years. A 2004 paper by Andrew Doust and Andrew Dinnan confirmed that the two genera do not form a monophyletic group, although they share distinctive similarities in their flowers.

=== Species list ===
The following is a list of Tasmannia species accepted by Plants of the World Online as at April 2024:

- Tasmannia acutifolia (Pulle) A.C.Sm. – New Guinea
- Tasmannia arfakensis (Gibbs) A.C.Sm. – New Guinea
- Tasmannia beccariana (Gibbs) A.C.Sm. – New Guinea
- Tasmannia brassii (A.C.Sm.) A.C.Sm. – New Guinea
- Tasmannia coriacea (Pulle) A.C.Sm. – New Guinea
- Tasmannia cyclopum (Diels) A.C.Sm. – New Guinea
- Tasmannia densifolia (Ridl.) A.C.Sm. – New Guinea
- Tasmannia dictyophlebia (Diels) A.C.Sm. – New Guinea
- Tasmannia elongata (Ridl.) A.C.Sm. – New Guinea
- Tasmannia fistulosa (Diels) A.C.Sm. – New Guinea
- Tasmannia glaucifolia J.B.Williams fragrant pepperbush (N.S.W.)
- Tasmannia grandiflora (Ridl.) A.C.Sm. – New Guinea
- Tasmannia hatamensis (Becc.) A.C.Sm. – New Guinea
- Tasmannia insipida (R.Br.) ex DC. brush pepperbush (New Guinea, Qld, N.S.W.)
- Tasmannia lamii (Diels) A.C.Sm. – New Guinea
- Tasmannia lanceolata (Poir.) A.C.Sm. mountain pepperbush (N.S.W., A.C.T., Vic. Tas.)
- Tasmannia macrantha (A.C.Sm.) A.C.Sm. – New Guinea
- Tasmannia membranea (F.Muell.) A.C.Sm. pepper tree – northeastern Queensland
- Tasmannia microphylla (A.C.Sm.) A.C.Sm. – New Guinea
- Tasmannia montis-wilhelmii (Hoogland) A.C.Sm. – New Guinea
- Tasmannia myrtoides (Diels) A.C.Sm. – New Guinea
- Tasmannia obovata (A.C.Sm.) A.C.Sm. – New Guinea
- Tasmannia oligandra (A.C.Sm.) A.C.Sm. – New Guinea
- Tasmannia pachyphylla (Diels) A.C.Sm. – New Guinea
- Tasmannia parviflora (Ridl.) A.C.Sm. – New Guinea
- Tasmannia piperita (Hook.f.) Miers – Borneo, Lesser Sunda Islands, Maluku, New Guinea, Philippines, Solomon Islands, Sulawesi
- Tasmannia pittosporoides (Diels) A.C.Sm. – New Guinea
- Tasmannia purpurascens (Vickery) A.C.Sm. broadleaf pepperbush – New South Wales
- Tasmannia reticulata (Diels) A.C.Sm. – New Guinea
- Tasmannia rosea (Ridl.) A.C.Sm. – New Guinea
- Tasmannia rubiginosa (A.C.Sm.) A.C.Sm. – New Guinea
- Tasmannia stipitata (Vickery) A.C.Sm. Dorrigo pepper – New South Wales
- Tasmannia vaccinioides (Ridl.) A.C.Sm. – New Guinea
- Tasmannia verticillata (Pulle) A.C.Sm. – New Guinea
- Tasmannia vickeriana (A.C.Sm.) A.C.Sm. Baw Baw pepper – Victoria
- Tasmannia xerophila M.Gray alpine pepperbush – New South Wales and Victoria
  - Tasmannia xerophila subsp. robusta Raleigh
  - Tasmannia xerophila subsp. xerophila

== Distribution and habitat ==
In Australia, the genus Tasmannia ranges from Tasmania and eastern Victoria and New South Wales to southeastern Queensland, and in the mountains of northeastern Queensland, where it grows in moist mountain forests and in wet areas in the drier forest and along watercourses to an elevation of 1500 m (5000 ft).

== See also ==
- Bushtucker
