= Menegazzia abscondita =

Scientific classification
- Domain: Eukaryota
- Kingdom: Fungi
- Division: Ascomycota
- Class: Lecanoromycetes
- Order: Lecanorales
- Family: Parmeliaceae
- Genus: Menegazzia
- Species: M. abscondita

Binomial name
- Menegazzia abscondita Kantvilas (2012)

Species of lichen

Menegazzia abscondita is a species of foliose lichen in the family Parmeliaceae. Found in Australasia, the species was described as new to science by Australian lichenologist Gintaras Kantvilas in 2012. The type specimen was collected along Gordon River Road in Tasmania at an altitude of 340 m (1,120 ft). Here it was found growing on satinwood (Nematolepis squamea) at the edge of a wet eucalypt forest. The specific epithet abscondita means "hidden", and refers to "the effort required to collect sufficient material upon which to base its description".

The lichen contains the secondary compounds atranorin and caperatic acid. Menegazzia inactiva is a closely related species that differs in subtle morphological differences as well as chemistry. Menegazzia abscondita is considered rare in Tasmania, as it has been collected from only a few locales. Kantvilas suggests that it is a canopy species found only in forest gaps at low heights. It has also been collected from Craigieburn Range in New Zealand, at an altitude of 1,200 m (3,900 ft).

== See also ==
- List of Menegazzia species
