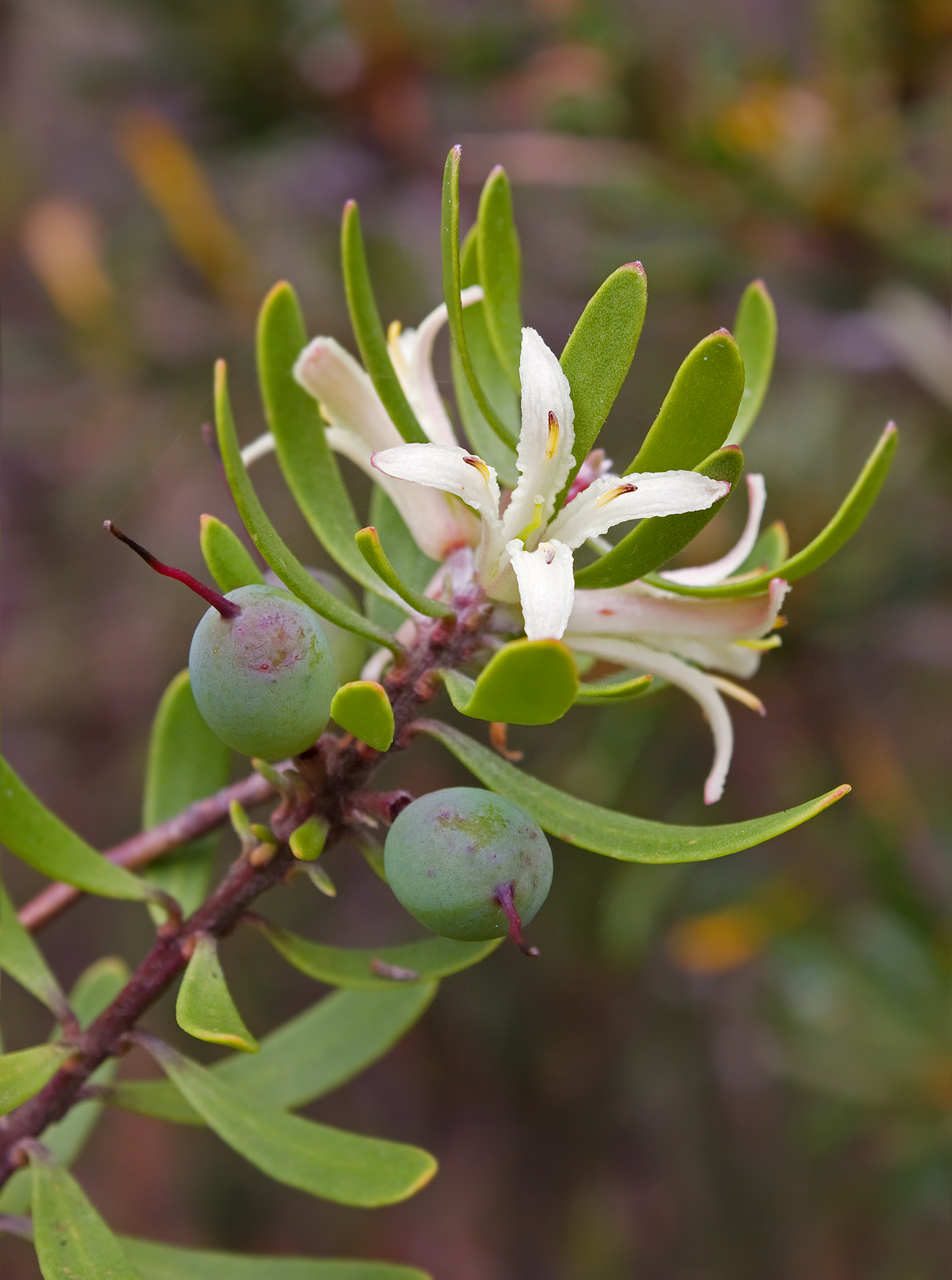
- In Mount Field National Park

Scientific classification
- Kingdom: Plantae
- Clade: Tracheophytes
- Clade: Angiosperms
- Clade: Eudicots
- Order: Proteales
- Family: Proteaceae
- Genus: Persoonia
- Species: P. gunnii

Binomial name
- Persoonia gunnii Hook.f.
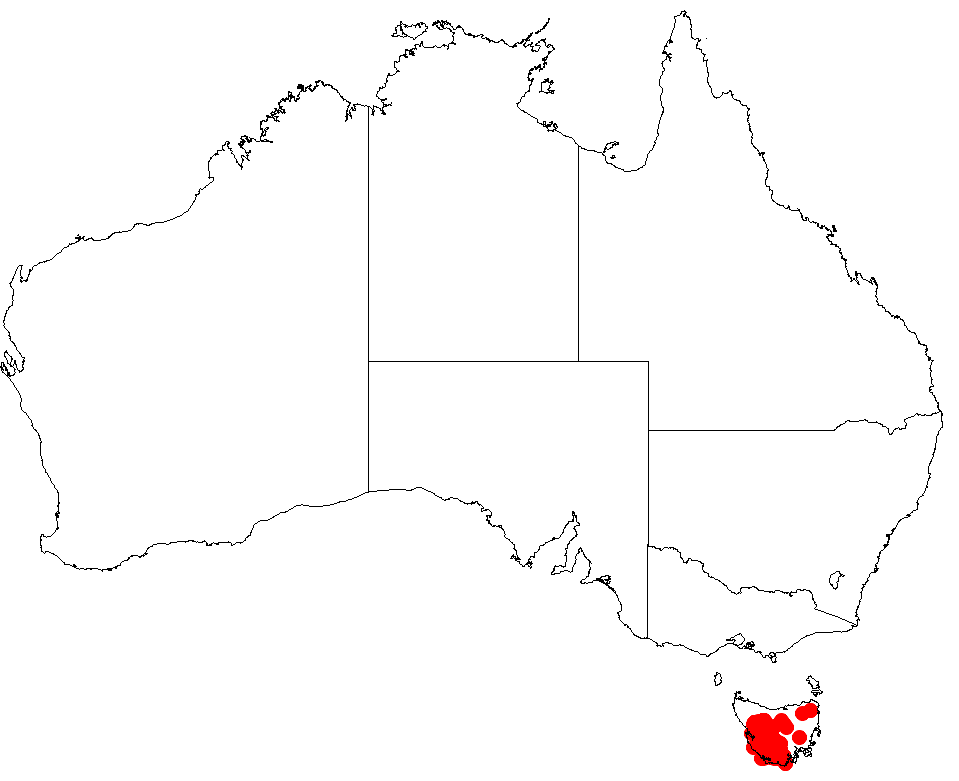
- Occurrence data from Australasian Virtual Herbarium

Synonyms
- Linkia gunnii (Hook.f.) Kuntze; Persoonia gunnii var. dilatata Hook.f. nom. inval.; Persoonia gunnii var. dilatata Meisn.; Persoonia gunnii Hook.f. var. gunnii; Persoonia gunnii var. oblanceolata Orchard

= Persoonia gunnii =

Species of flowering plant

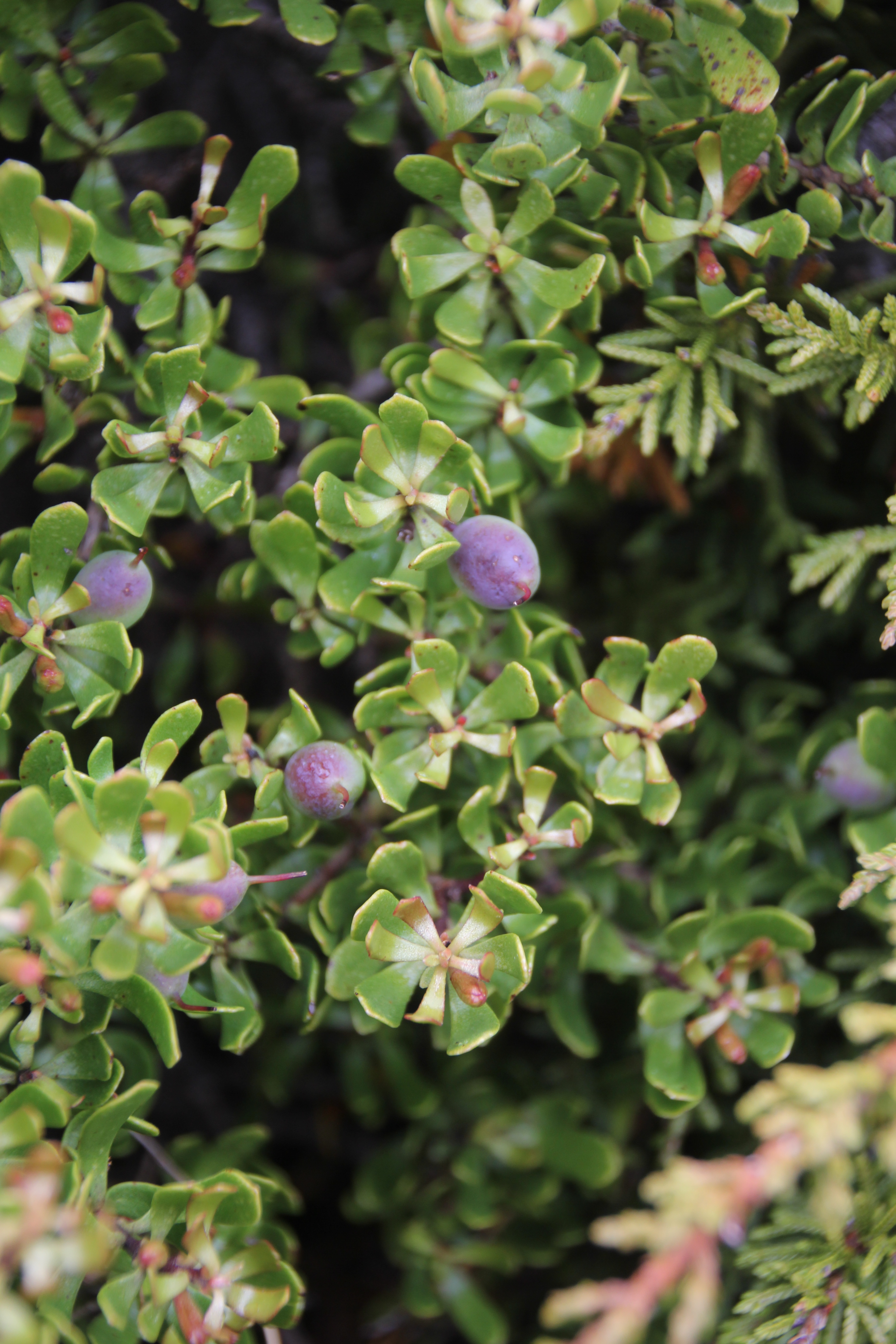
Foliage and fruit

Persoonia gunnii is a species of flowering plant in the family Proteaceae and is endemic to Tasmania. It is an erect shrub with young branchlets that are hairy at first, spatula-shaped to egg-shaped leaves with the narrower end towards the base, and white to cream-coloured flowers.

== Description ==
Persoonia gunnii is an erect shrub that typically grows to a height of 0.65–3 m (2 ft 2 in – 9 ft 10 in) with its young branchlets covered with erect, whitish or greyish hairs. The leaves are spatula-shaped to egg-shaped with the narrower end towards the base, 10–50 mm (0.39–1.97 in) long, 3–10 mm (0.12–0.39 in) wide and upcurved with an erect tip. The flowers are erect on hairy pedicels 2.5–5 mm (0.098–0.197 in) long, the tepals white to cream-coloured, 10–13.5 mm (0.39–0.53 in) long and hairy on the outside, apart from the glabrous tip. Flowering occurs from December to May. The species is sometimes confused with P. muelleri.

== Taxonomy ==
Persoonia gunnii was first formally described in 1847 by the English botanist Joseph Dalton Hooker in W.D. Hooker's London Journal of Botany from specimens collected on the "May-day Plains" by R.C. Gunn.

Populations with characteristics intermediate between P. gunnii and P. muelleri are known from Dove Lake–Cradle Mountain and Adamsons Peak–South Cape localities. Further intermediates with P. muelleri subspecies angustifolia have been recorded from Adamsons Peak, the South Cape Range and the Recherche Bay area in southern Tasmania, but further work is needed to assess their status.

== Distribution and habitat ==
This geebung is endemic to Tasmania where it is found to the south and west of Black Bluff Range–Lake St Clair and the River Derwent at altitudes from 500 to 1,300 m (1,600 to 4,300 ft) above sea level. Habitats include alpine heathland, subalpine wet sclerophyll forest and rainforest, on soils composed of and lying over dolerite, quartzite and limestone.

== Ecology ==
Persoonia gunnii is highly sensitive to dieback.
