= Persoonia moscalii =

Scientific classification
- Kingdom: Plantae
- Clade: Tracheophytes
- Clade: Angiosperms
- Clade: Eudicots
- Order: Proteales
- Family: Proteaceae
- Genus: Persoonia
- Species: P. moscalii

Binomial name
- Persoonia moscalii Persoonia moscalii Orchard

Species of shrub

Persoonia moscalii, commonly known as the creeping geebung, is a shrub native to southwestern Tasmania.

== Description ==
P. moscalii is a prostrate shrub that spreads to around a metre in diameter, with its main branches growing horizontally before bearing side branches that rise up 4–5 cm off the ground. The tallest it gets is around 10 cm (4 in). The obovate to spathulate leaves are 6–15 mm long and 2–4 mm wide. Their upper surface is flat to concave. Leaves grow upright, with those arising from the underside of horizontal branches bending to grow upwards. The yellow flowers appear in February and March. The shiny dark red-purple fruit are oval, measuring 0.8 cm wide by 1 cm long.

== Taxonomy ==
Australian botanist Tony Orchard described P. moscalii in 1983, naming it for Tony Moscal, who collected the type specimen on 16 March 1980 and spent many days mapping out its distribution and habits. The genus was reviewed by Peter Weston for the Flora of Australia treatment in 1995, and the three endemic Tasmanian species P. muelleri, P. gunnii and P. moscalii are classified in the gunnii group.

== Distribution and habitat ==
The shrub is found only in the Melaleuca, Bathurst and Frankland Ranges in south-western Tasmania. It grows on south-facing slopes exposed to the elements on alpine heathland, on quartzite soils, from altitudes of 640 to 760 m.

== Conservation status ==
Persoonia moscalii is classified as rare under the Tasmanian Threatened Species Protection Act 1995, though is not listed federally under the Environment Protection and Biodiversity Conservation Act 1999.

== Ecology ==
Bees are thought to be the main pollinators of P. moscalii.
