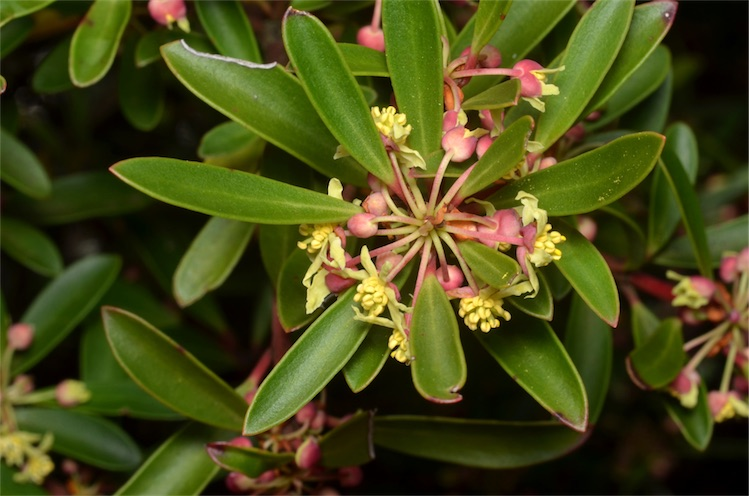
- Female flowers and immature fruit

Scientific classification
- Kingdom: Plantae
- Clade: Tracheophytes
- Clade: Angiosperms
- Clade: Magnoliids
- Order: Canellales
- Family: Winteraceae
- Genus: Tasmannia
- Species: T. lanceolata

Binomial name
- Tasmannia lanceolata (Poir.) A.C.Sm.

Synonyms
- List: Drimys aromatica (R.Br. ex DC.) F.Muell.; Drimys aromatica (R.Br. ex DC.) F.Muell. var. aromatica; Drimys lanceolata (Poir.) Baill.; Drimys lanceolata (Poir.) Baill. var. lanceolata; Drimys xerophila var. β aromatica (R.Br. ex DC.) P.Parm.; Tasmania aromatica F.Muell. orth. var.; Tasmannia aromatica R.Br. ex DC.; Winterana lanceolata Poir.; Winterania lanceolata Poir. orth. var.

= Tasmannia lanceolata =

Species of shrub

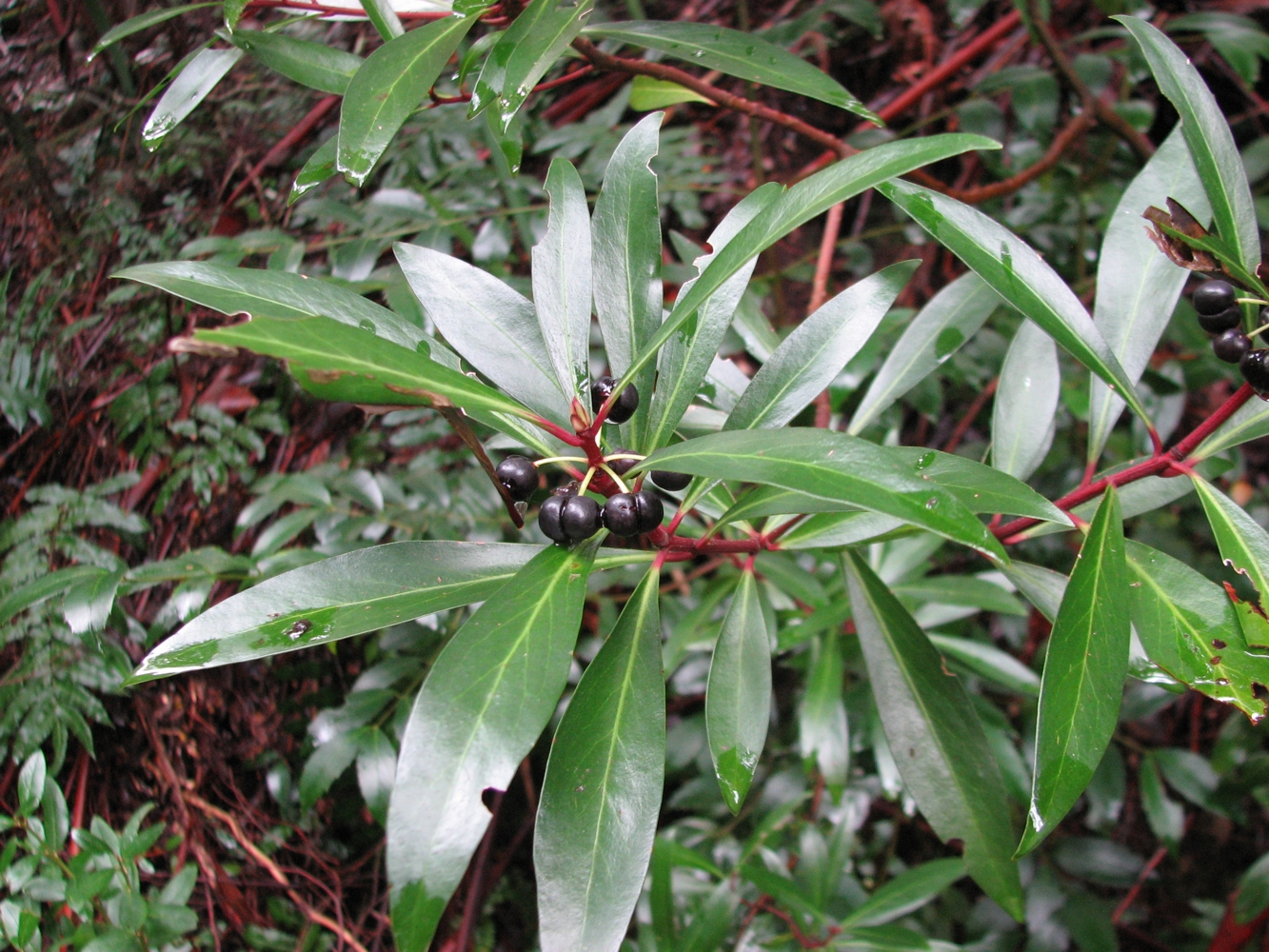
Mature fruit

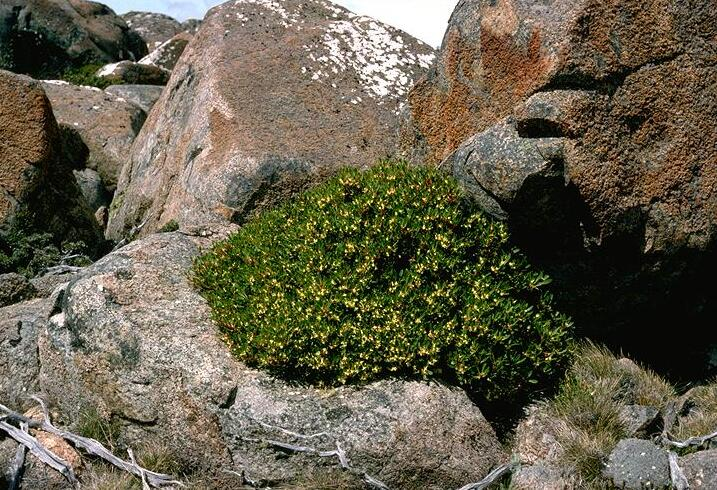
Habit on Mount Wellington

Tasmannia lanceolata, commonly known as pepper tree, native pepper, mountain pepper or mountain pepperbush, is a species of flowering plant in the family Winteraceae, and is endemic to south-eastern Australia. It is a dioecious bushy shrub to small tree with lance-shaped or narrowly ellipic leaves, male and female flowers on separate plants, the flowers with 3 to 9 petals, and the fruit a deep maroon to glossy black berry.

== Description ==
Tasmannia lanceolata is a bushy shrub or small tree that typically grows to a height of 1.5–4 m (4 ft 11 in – 13 ft 1 in) and has smooth, reddish branchlets. Its leaves are lance-shaped to narrowly elliptic, 20–120 mm (0.79–4.72 in) long and 6–35 mm (0.24–1.38 in) wide on a petiole 2–6 mm (0.079–0.236 in) long. Male and female flowers are borne on separate plants, each flower with 3 to 9 linear or narrowly egg-shaped petals 4–10 mm (0.16–0.39 in) long and 1.5–3.5 mm (0.059–0.138 in) wide. Male flowers are borne on a pedicel 8–25 mm (0.31–0.98 in) long and have 15 to 28 stamens, female flowers are on a pedicel 4–12 mm (0.16–0.47 in) long with 1 or 2 carpels with 9 to 18 ovules. Flowering occurs from September to November and the fruit is a spherical, deep maroon to glossy black berry 5–10 mm (0.20–0.39 in) long with 4 to 18 strongly curved seeds 2.5–3.5 mm (0.098–0.138 in) long.

== Taxonomy ==
This species was first formally described in 1808 by Jean Louis Marie Poiret, who gave it the name Winterana lanceolata in Encyclopédie Méthodique, Botanique, from specimens collected by Jacques Labillardière from the coast of Australia. In 1969, Albert Charles Smith transferred the species to Tasmannia as T. lanceolata in the journal Taxon.

== Distribution and habitat ==
Tasmannia lanceolata grows in forest and temperate rainforest south from the Blue Mountains in New South Wales, altitudes of 300 to 1,400 m (980 to 4,590 ft) in the Australian Capital Territory, Victoria, and Tasmania.

== Uses ==
Polygodial has been identified as the primary active compound in Tasmannia lanceolata, and is also responsible for its peppery taste. The fruits also contain benzoic acids, flavanols, and flavanones, as well as eugenol, methyl eugenol, and gallic acid, and also the glycosides quercetin, rutin, and possibly vitamin D.

The leaf and berry have long been used as a spice, typically dried. The 1889 book The Useful Native Plants of Australia records that common names included "Pepper Tree" and that "the drupe is used as a condiment, being a fair substitute for pepper, or rather allspice [...] The leaves and bark also have a hot, biting, cinnamon-like taste."

More recently, it has become popularised as a bushfood condiment. It can be added to curries, cheeses, and alcoholic beverages. It is exported to Japan to flavour wasabi. The berries are sweet and fruity at first with a lingering peppery aftertaste. Dried T. lanceolata berries and leaves have strong antimicrobial activity against food spoilage organisms. It also has high antioxidant activity. Low safrole clonal selections are grown in plantations for commercial use, as safrole is considered a low-risk toxin.

Used in colonial medicine as a substitute for Winter's bark, a stomachic, it was also used for treating scurvy. Tasmanian pepper is one of a number of native Australian herbs and food species being supported by the Australian Native Food Industry Ltd, which brings together producers of food species from all parts of Australia. The pepperberry can be used as a fish poison.

It can be grown as an ornamental garden plant. Its berries attract birds, including currawongs, that feed on them. It can be propagated from cuttings or seed, and can grow in a well-drained acidic soil with some shade, but is sensitive to Phytophthora cinnamomi.

Garden cultivars include 'Mt. Wellington', a compact plant with coppery new growth, and 'Suzette', a variegated cultivar.

== See also ==
- List of Australian herbs and spices
