= Zanthoxylum mayu =

Conservation status
- Critically Endangered (IUCN 3.1)

Scientific classification
- Kingdom: Plantae
- Clade: Tracheophytes
- Clade: Angiosperms
- Clade: Eudicots
- Clade: Rosids
- Order: Sapindales
- Family: Rutaceae
- Genus: Zanthoxylum
- Species: Z. mayu

Binomial name
- Zanthoxylum mayu Bertero

Synonyms
- Fagara lutea (Molina) Gunckel; Fagara mayu (Bertero) Engl.; Fagus lutea Molina

Species of plant

Zanthoxylum mayu, synonym Fagara mayu, is a species of flowering plant in the family Rutaceae. It is a tree endemic to Robinson Crusoe Island in the Juan Fernández Archipelago of Chile. It is threatened by habitat loss.
