= Ben Halls Gap National Park =

National park of New South Wales, Australia

- IUCN category Ia (strict nature reserve)
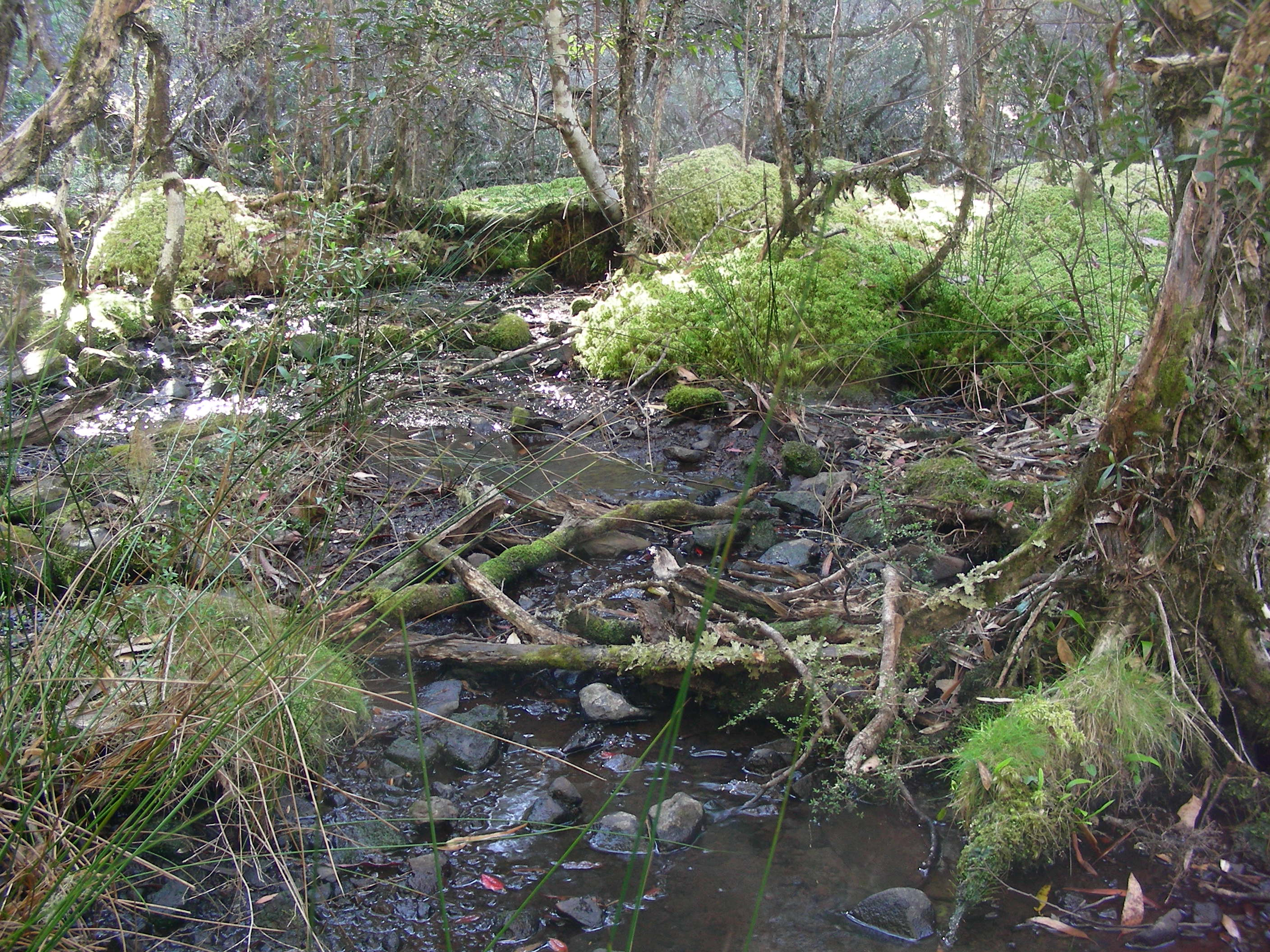
- Ben Halls Gap National Park, October 2013

- Location within New South Wales
- Location: New South Wales
- Coordinates: 31°37′11″S 151°11′06″E
- Area: 30.18 km^{2} (11.65 sq mi)
- Established: 1995
- Governing body: National Parks and Wildlife Service (New South Wales)

Ben Halls Gap National Park is a national park in New South Wales, Australia, 251 km north of Sydney.

Near the national park are villages like Nundle and Murrurundi and the town of Quirindi.

One of the main features of the park are the extraordinary ancient eucalyptus forests.

== See also ==
- Protected areas of New South Wales
