= Paul Évariste Parmentier =

French agronomist and botanist

Paul Évariste Parmentier (29 April 1860 in Semmadon – 10 May 1941 in Besançon) was a French agronomist and botanist.

He taught classes in the communities of Arbois (1882–89) and Baume-les-Dames (1889–98), and in the meantime, received his degree in natural sciences at Besançon (1889) and his doctorate from the University of Lyon (1892). From 1892 he was a professor of agricultural botany at the faculty of sciences of Besançon, where he taught classes up until 1930. At Besançon, he also served as director of its botanical garden.

From 1902 to 1919 he was director of the agricultural station of Franche-Comté. From 1903 up until his death, he served as president of the Société d'Horticulture du Doubs (Horticultural Society of Doubs).

== Selected works ==
- Contribution à l'étude du genre Pulmonaria, 1891 – Contribution to the study of Pulmonaria.
- Histologie comparée des Ébénacées dans ses rapports avec la morphologie et l'histoire généalogique des ces plantes, 1892 – Comparative histology of Ebenaceae. Relationship involving the morphology and genetic history of these plants.
- Histoire des Magnoliacées, 1895 – On Magnoliaceae.
- Abiétinées du département du Doubs au point de vue de l'arboriculture et de la sylviculture, 1895 – Firs of Doubs department from the viewpoint of arboriculture and forestry.
- Flore nouvelle de la chaîne jurassique & de la Haute-Saône, à l'usage du botaniste herborisant, 1895 – New flora of the Jura chain and of Haute-Saône.
- Recherches anatomiques et taxinomiques sur les rosiers, 1898 – Anatomical and taxonomic research of roses.
- Traité élémentaire et pratique de botanique agricole, 1902 – Elementary and practical treatise of agricultural botany.
- Les noyers et les carya en France : espèces et variétés – culture – maladies – produits, 1912 – The walnut and hickory trees of France; species and varieties, cultivation, diseases, products.
- Leçons de botanique appliquée a l'horticulture et notions d'horticulture pratique, 1924 – Botanical lessons applied to horticulture and concepts of practical horticulture.
