= Willem Vink =

Dutch botanist

Willem Vink (born 1931 in Schiedam, South Holland, Netherlands) is a Dutch botanist.

== See also ==
- Category:Taxa named by Willem Vink
