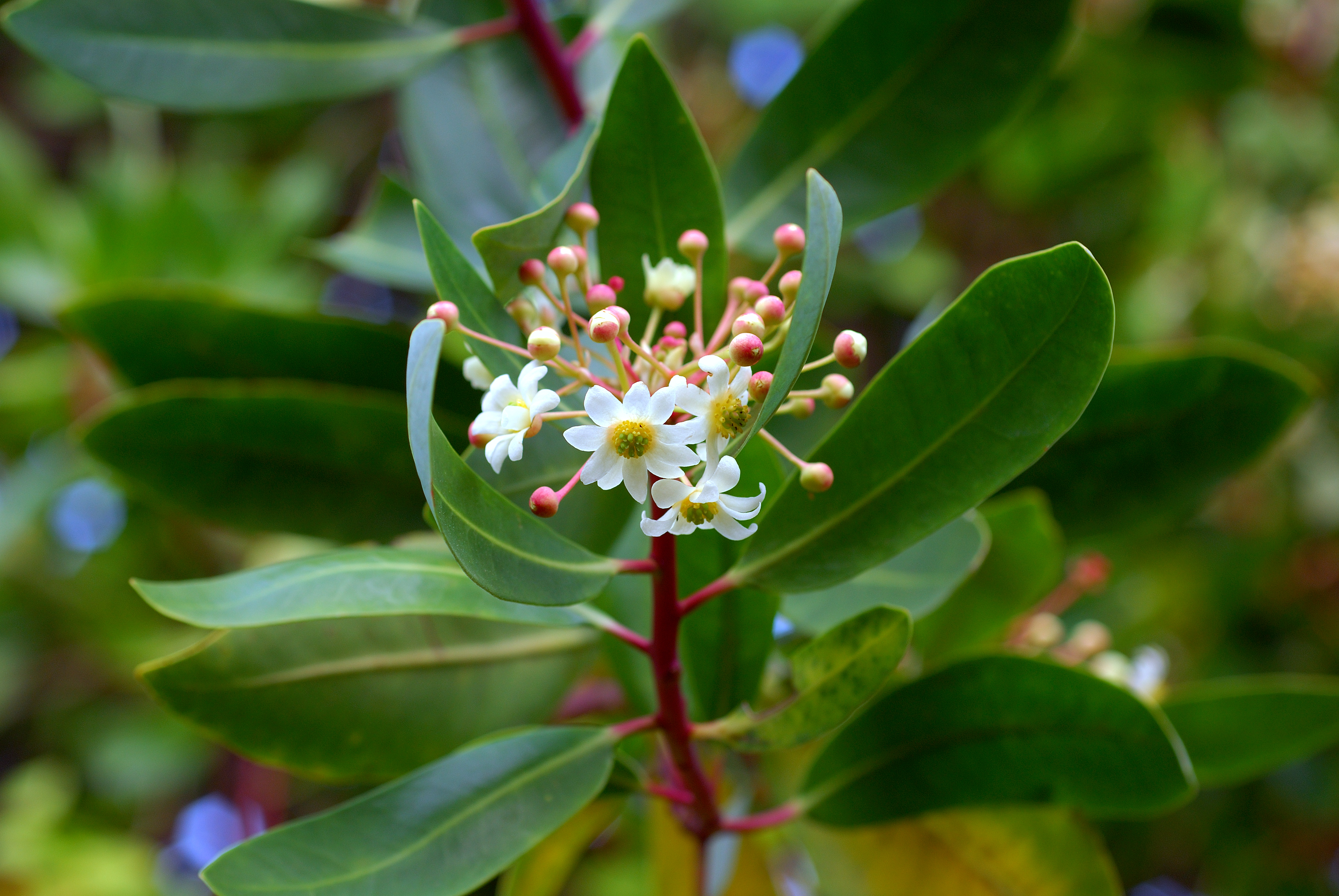
- Drimys winteri

Scientific classification
- Kingdom: Plantae
- Clade: Tracheophytes
- Clade: Angiosperms
- Clade: Magnoliids
- Order: Canellales
- Family: Winteraceae; R.Br. ex Lindl.

Genera
- Drimys; Pseudowintera; Takhtajania; Tasmannia; Zygogynum

= Winteraceae =

Winteraceae Temporal range: Albian - recent

Family of flowering plants

Winteraceae is a primitive family of tropical trees and shrubs including 93 species in five genera. It is of particular interest because it is such a primitive angiosperm family, distantly related to Magnoliaceae, though it has a much more southern distribution. Plants in this family grow mostly in the southern hemisphere, and have been found in tropical to temperate climate regions of Malesia, Oceania, eastern Australia, New Zealand, Madagascar and the Neotropics, with most of the genera concentrated in Australasia and Malesia. The five genera, Takhtajania, Tasmannia, Drimys, Pseudowintera, and Zygogynum s.l. all have distinct geographic extant populations. Takhtajania includes a single species, T. perrieri, endemic only to Madagascar, Tasmannia has the largest distribution of genera in Winteraceae with species across the Philippines, Borneo, New Guinea, Eastern Australia, and Tasmania, Drimys is found in the Neotropical realm, from southern Mexico to the subarctic forests of southern South America, Pseudowintera is found only in New Zealand, and Zygogynum has species in New Guinea and New Caledonia.

This family has been estimated to be anywhere from 105 to at least 35 million years ago. Being one of few angiosperms forming persistent tetrads with prominent sculpturing, pollen of Winteraceae is rare but easy to identify in the fossil record. Pollen samples found in Gabon may indicate that the family is at least 120 million years old, but the association of these fossils with Winteraceae is uncertain. Oldest unambiguous Winteraceae fossils are from the middle to late Albian of Israel (~110 million years old; described as Qatanipollis). Pollen fossils indicate that the range has been much wider than it is now, reaching north as far as Greenland during the Paleocene (Danian), and disappearing from continental Africa (Cape Peninsula, South Africa) in the Miocene. Equally characteristic is Winteraceae wood, which lacks xylem vessels in contrast to most other flowering plants. Fossil Winteraceae wood has been found in the Late Cretaceous to Paleogene (c. 85–35 million years ago) of Antarctica (Santonian-Campanian), western North America (Central Valley, California; Maastrichian) and Europe (Helmstedt, Germany; Eocene).

According to the 1998 APG I system, it did not belong to any order, but it has since been placed in Canellales by the APG II, APG III and APG IV systems.

- Winteraceae
  - - - - Zygogynum
        - Pseudowintera
      - Drimys
    - Tasmannia
  - Takhtajania

== Description ==
Members of the family Winteraceae are trees or shrubs. The leaves are alternate, with light green dots and a fragrant aroma. Some are used to produce essential oils. Stipules are absent. Flowers are small, mostly appearing in cymes or fascicles. They have two to six free, valvate sepals, though they are united in Drimys.

The Winteraceae have no vessels in their xylem. This makes them relatively immune to xylem embolisms caused by freezing temperatures. In addition, vascular occlusion can occur near the openings of the stomata, preventing excess water from entering.

Among all species, the distinctive characters of released pollen tetrads are easily recognized using light and electron microscopy.

== Evolution of vesselless wood ==
Winteraceae was initially placed as a basal group within the Angiosperms due to its vesselless wood. Xylem vessels were seen as an important evolved character for the diversification and success of Angiosperms, so vesselless wood was seen as an archaic trait, resulting in basal placement of the Winteraceae. However, molecular phylogenetic work placed Winteraceae within the Magnoliids, well within the angiosperms. This placement suggests that the vesselless wood of the Winteraceae was a derived character rather than ancestral. Through the fossil pollen record, it is hypothesized that Winteraceae moved from Northern Gondwana through Southern Gondwana in the Cretaceous. This meant movement from hot humid environments to temperate humid environments where freeze-thaw events occurred. Vesselless wood has 20% of the water conductivity of vessel-bearing wood, however, under freeze events, wood with vessels loses up to 85% of water conductivity while vesselless wood loses at most 6% of water conductivity. The ability to avoid serious water limitation and therefore the shedding of leaves is hypothesized to be a major evolutionary pressure behind the reversion to vesselless wood. This is further supported by the heteroxylly hypothesis in which “primitive” vessels conferred little difference in stem hydraulic efficiency under normal conditions as compared to vesselless angiosperms. This would indicate that the pressure of freeze-thaw events and the subsequent risk of embolism would be a stronger evolutionary factor compared to the weaker hydraulic constraints of vesselless wood compared to “primitive” vessels. This movement from hot humid environments to temperature humid environments where freeze-thaw events occurred is seen as the evolutionary pressure behind the unique reversion to vesselless wood in Winteraceae.

Another character of Winteraceae that was seen to indicate a basal position in the phylogeny was the presence of waxy stomatal plugs, seen as limiting water loss in respiration and therefore an archaic trait to limit water loss. However, further research showed that in these humid environments, water cover on the surface of leaves decreased photosynthetic rates and waxy stomatal plugs reduce this water cover and therefore reduce the negative impacts on photosynthetic ability. Winteraceae species with stomatal plugs removed saw decreases in photosynethic rates of up to 40%. This further shows that characters once thought to be archaic could rather be derived adaptations to temperate humid environments.

== Rediscovery of Takhtajania ==
Takhtajania perrieri was first collected 1909 on the Manongarivo Massif of central Madagascar at an elevation of 1700 meters. In 1963, the French botanist René Paul Raymond Capuron examined the unidentified plant sample, which he identified as a new species, which he named Bubbia perrieri, after the French botanist Henri Perrier de la Bâthie, classifying it in the Australasian genus Bubbia. In 1978, the botanists Baranova and J. F. Leroy reclassified the plant into its own genus, Takhtajania, after the Russian botanist Armen Takhtajan. Many subsequent expeditions to find the species were futile, but in 1994 Malagasy plant collector Fanja Rasoavimbahoaka collected a specimen in Anjahanaribe-Sud Special Reserve 150 km from the location at which the 1909 specimen was collected, which George E. Schatz identified in May 1997 as Takhtajania. A subsequent expedition discovered a large grove of the species at the spot where the second sample was collected.

== Notable species ==
Drimys winteri (Winter's bark) is a slender tree native to the Magellanic and Valdivian temperate forests of Chile and Argentina. It is a common garden plant grown for its fragrant mahogany-red bark, bright-green leaves, and its clusters of creamy white, jasmine-scented flowers. The bark has historically been used to prevent scurvy.

Tasmannia piperita is notable for the great range of numbers for petal, stamen and pistil counts. Tasmannia lanceolata, known as Tasmanian pepper, is grown as an ornamental shrub, and is increasingly being used as a condiment.
