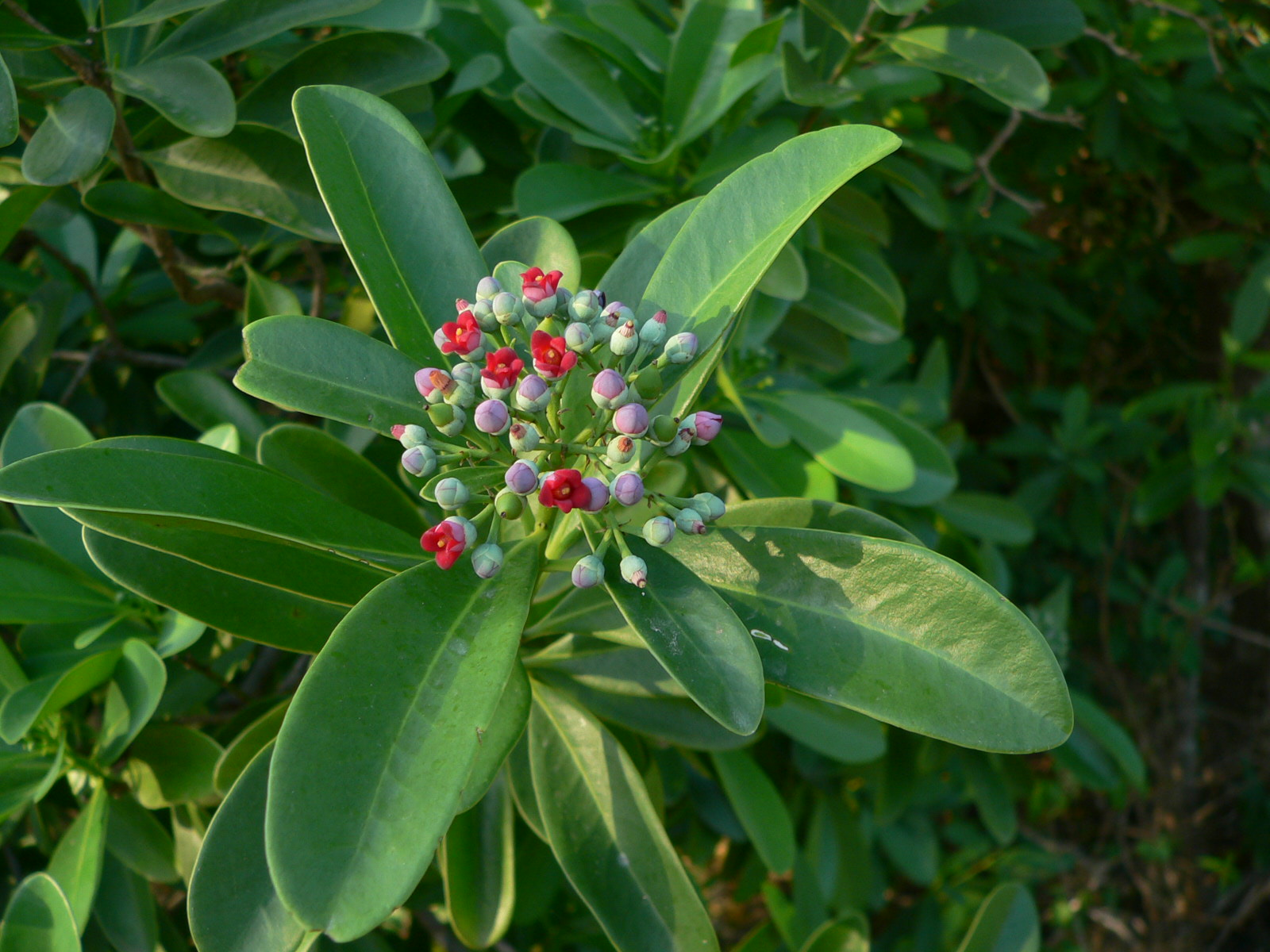
- Canella winteriana

Scientific classification
- Kingdom: Plantae
- Clade: Tracheophytes
- Clade: Angiosperms
- Clade: Magnoliids
- Order: Canellales; Cronquist

Families
- Canellaceae Mart.; Winteraceae R.Br. ex Lindl.

= Canellales =

Canellales Temporal range: Albian - recent

Order of flowering plants

Canellales is an order of flowering plants, one of the four orders of the magnoliids. It is accepted by the most recent classifications of flowering plants, the APG IV and APG V systems, and is defined to contain two families, Canellaceae and Winteraceae, which comprise 136 species of fragrant trees and shrubs. The Canellaceae are found in tropical America and Africa, and the Winteraceae are part of the Antarctic flora, found in diverse parts of the southern hemisphere. Although the order was defined based on phylogenetic studies, a number of possible synapomorphies have been suggested, relating to the pollen tube, the seeds, the thickness of the integument, and other aspects of the morphology.

Until 1999, these two families were not considered to be closely related. Instead the Winteraceae were considered to be a primitive family (due to the structure of the xylem and carpel, a structure which now seems to be derived from xylem and carpels more typical of the angiosperms as a whole. The Canellaceae was often considered to be related to the Myristicaceae. However, studies starting in 1999, based on molecular phylogeny or morphology, have supported uniting these two families.

- Magnoliids
  - - Piperales
    - - Canellales
        - Canellaceae
        - Winteraceae
  - - Laurales
    - Magnoliales

The current composition and phylogeny of the Canellales.
