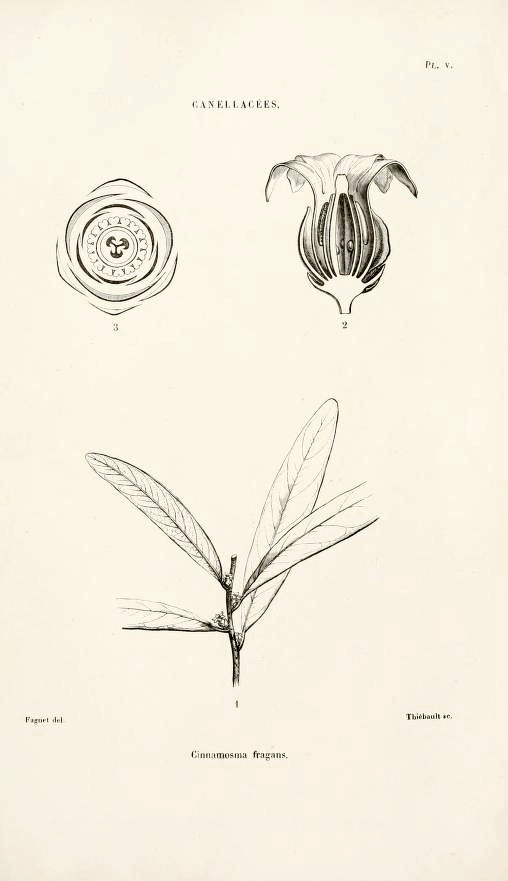
- original plate of Baillon, in Adansonia 7 pl 5 1867

Conservation status
- Least Concern (IUCN 3.1)

Scientific classification
- Kingdom: Plantae
- Clade: Embryophytes
- Clade: Tracheophytes
- Clade: Spermatophytes
- Clade: Angiosperms
- Clade: Magnoliids
- Order: Canellales
- Family: Canellaceae
- Genus: Cinnamosma
- Species: C. fragrans

Binomial name
- Cinnamosma fragrans Baill.

Synonyms
- Cinnamosma fragrans var. baillonii Courchet; Cinnamosma fragrans var. perrieri Courchet

= Cinnamosma fragrans =

Species of flowering plant

Cinnamosma fragrans is a species of flowering plant in the family Canellaceae. It is a shrub or tree endemic to Madagascar, where it is commonly known as saro.

== Description ==
Cinnamosma fragrans is a shrub or medium-sized tree, growing up to 8 meters tall. It can be distinguished from the other species of Cinnamosma by its oval-shaped fruits; the fruits of C. macrocarpa and C. madagascariensis are globose.

== Range and habitat ==
Cinnamosma fragrans native to the provinces of Antsiranana and Mahajanga in northern and western Madagascar. It is widespread in dry deciduous forests between sea level and 500 meters elevation. It typically grows on unconsolidated sands, sandstone, or limestone substrates. There are dense populations in Melaky, and Diana regions. The species' estimated extent of occurrence (EOO) is 151,773 km^{2}.

Specimens collected from higher-elevation subhumid forests are misidentified specimens of C. madagascariensis or C. macrocarpa.

== Uses ==
Cinnamosma fragrans is a traditional medicinal plant used to treat respiratory problems and gastrointestinal infections. The leaves of the plant are harvested in Mahajanga Province to make essential oil for national and international trade.
