= Warburgia stuhlmannii =

Conservation status
- Vulnerable (IUCN 3.1)

Scientific classification
- Kingdom: Plantae
- Clade: Embryophytes
- Clade: Tracheophytes
- Clade: Spermatophytes
- Clade: Angiosperms
- Clade: Magnoliids
- Order: Canellales
- Family: Canellaceae
- Genus: Warburgia
- Species: W. stuhlmannii

Binomial name
- Warburgia stuhlmannii Engl.

Species of flowering plant

Warburgia stuhlmannii is a species of flowering plant in the family Canellaceae. The genus is named after Dr Otto Warburg, botanist and lecturer in Berlin. and the species after Franz Stuhlmann, also a renowned botanist who directed the Amani Research Institute and its botanical garden in German East Africa. It is a rare, small, evergreen tree, reaching heights from 12 to 24 metres, and has glossy leaves. It is found in the coastal woodlands and forests of southeastern Kenya and northeastern Tanzania and is threatened by habitat loss. It is known as mkaa in Swahili.
