= Warburgia elongata =

Conservation status
- Critically Endangered (IUCN 3.1)

Scientific classification
- Kingdom: Plantae
- Clade: Embryophytes
- Clade: Tracheophytes
- Clade: Spermatophytes
- Clade: Angiosperms
- Clade: Magnoliids
- Order: Canellales
- Family: Canellaceae
- Genus: Warburgia
- Species: W. elongata

Binomial name
- Warburgia elongata Verdc.

Species of flowering plant

Warburgia elongata is a species of plant in the family Canellaceae. It is endemic to Ruangwa District of Lindi Region, Tanzania.
