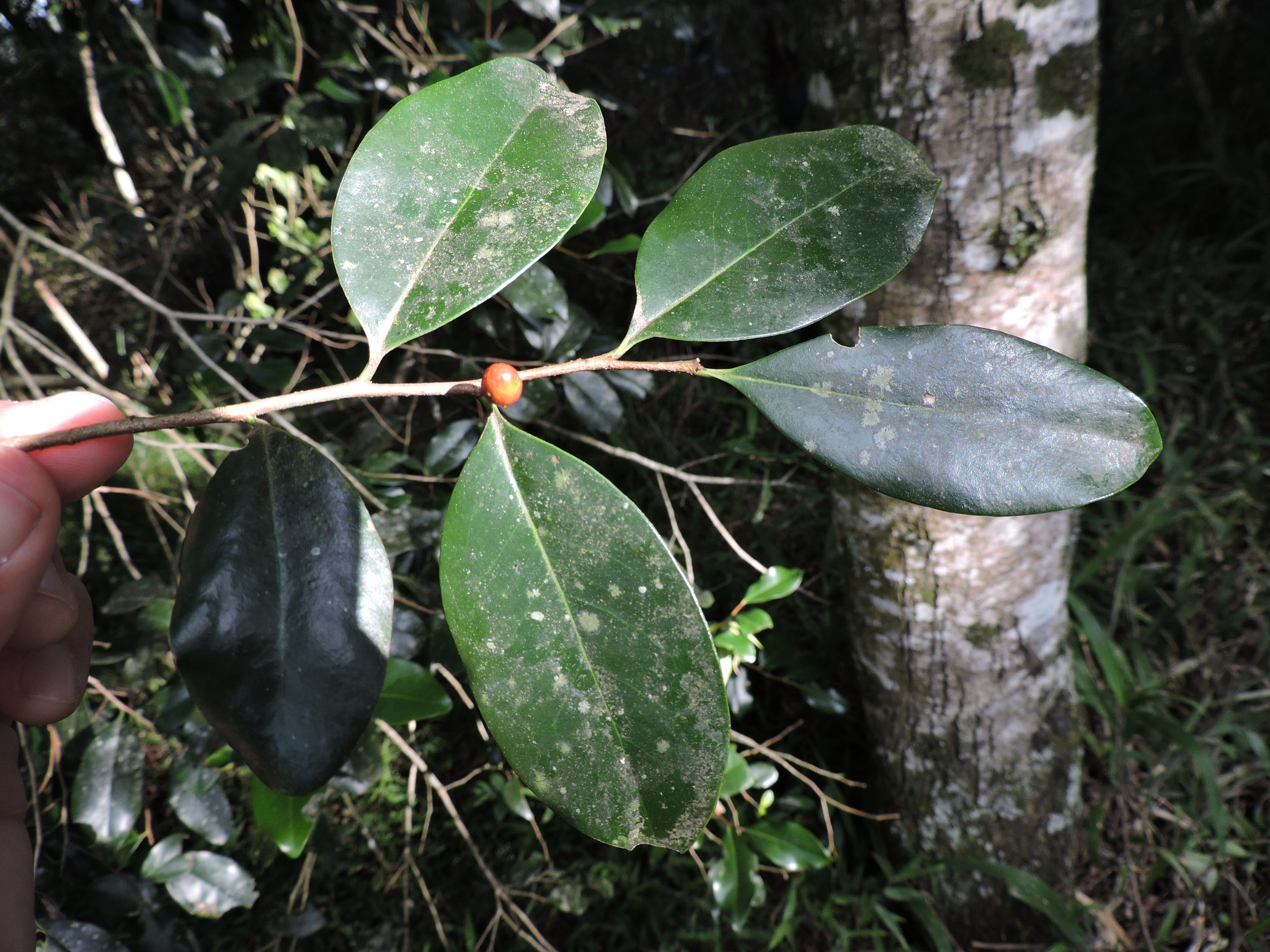

Conservation status
- Least Concern (IUCN 3.1)

Scientific classification
- Kingdom: Plantae
- Clade: Embryophytes
- Clade: Tracheophytes
- Clade: Spermatophytes
- Clade: Angiosperms
- Clade: Magnoliids
- Order: Canellales
- Family: Canellaceae
- Genus: Cinnamodendron
- Species: C. dinisii

Binomial name
- Cinnamodendron dinisii Schwacke

Synonyms
- Capsicodendron dinisii (Schwacke) Occhioni; Capsicodendron pimenteira Hoehne

= Cinnamodendron dinisii =

Species of flowering plant

Cinnamodendron dinisii is a species of flowering plant in the family Canellaceae. It is a tree native to southeastern and southern Brazil.
