= Pleodendron macranthum =

Conservation status
- Critically Endangered (IUCN 2.3)

Scientific classification
- Kingdom: Plantae
- Clade: Tracheophytes
- Clade: Angiosperms
- Clade: Magnoliids
- Order: Canellales
- Family: Canellaceae
- Genus: Pleodendron
- Species: P. macranthum

Binomial name
- Pleodendron macranthum (Baill.) Tiegh.

Species of plant

Pleodendron macranthum (chupacallos) is a rare species of tree in the family Canellaceae. It is endemic to Puerto Rico, where there are only three tiny populations remaining. Two individual plants are located in El Yunque and 8 to 10 plants remain in Río Abajo State Forest. This tree is a federally listed endangered species of the United States.

This evergreen tree grows up to 10 meters tall and 20 centimeters in diameter. The wood is hard and white in color. The leathery leaves are up to 12.5 centimeters long by 5 wide. The blades are dark green, shiny, and smooth on the edges. Flowers occur singly in the leaf axils. The flower is 2 centimeters wide and has 12 petals. The fruit ripens purple-black and is about 2 centimeters wide.

This tree is rare and limited in distribution because of deforestation and habitat modification in the forests of Puerto Rico.
