= Cinnamodendron angustifolium =

Conservation status
- Critically Endangered (IUCN 3.1)

Scientific classification
- Kingdom: Plantae
- Clade: Embryophytes
- Clade: Tracheophytes
- Clade: Spermatophytes
- Clade: Angiosperms
- Clade: Magnoliids
- Order: Canellales
- Family: Canellaceae
- Genus: Cinnamodendron
- Species: C. angustifolium

Binomial name
- Cinnamodendron angustifolium Sleumer

Species of flowering plant

Cinnamodendron angustifolium is a species of flowering plant in the family Canellaceae. It has been found growing in the Grand Anse River valley, in the western Massif de la Hotte mountain range in southwestern Haiti. The species had been found and documented only once, in July 1928 by Erik Leonard Ekman.
