= Cinnamodendron sampaioanum =

Conservation status
- Least Concern (IUCN 3.1)

Scientific classification
- Kingdom: Plantae
- Clade: Embryophytes
- Clade: Tracheophytes
- Clade: Spermatophytes
- Clade: Angiosperms
- Clade: Magnoliids
- Order: Canellales
- Family: Canellaceae
- Genus: Cinnamodendron
- Species: C. sampaioanum

Binomial name
- Cinnamodendron sampaioanum Occhioni

Species of flowering plant

Cinnamodendron sampaioanum is a species of flowering plant in the family Canellaceae. It is found in the state of Rio de Janeiro in southeastern Brazil.
