= Franz Stuhlmann =

German naturalist, zoologist and African explorer

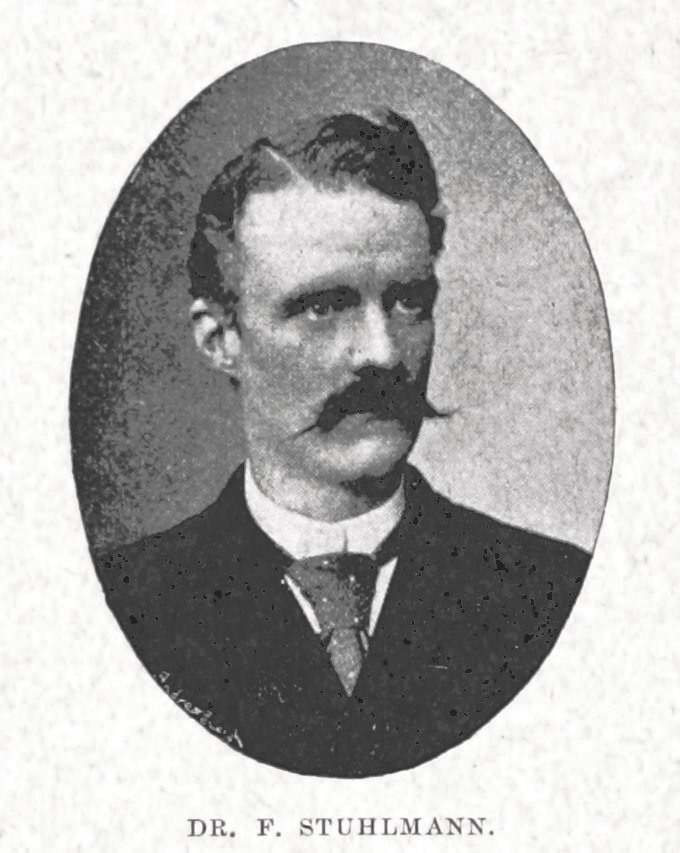

Franz Ludwig Stuhlmann (29 October 1863 – 19 November 1928) was a German naturalist, zoologist and African explorer, born in Hamburg.

== Biography ==
Stuhlmann was born and grew up in Hamburg where his father was an architect. He took a great interest in natural history while at school and went on to study natural sciences at Tübingen and Freiburg, earning his doctorate at the latter. Concentrating on zoology, he also undertook studies at the University of Kiel before being employed as a demonstrator at the Zoological Institute of Würzburg in 1887. He did not stay long, however, but left Germany the following year on what would be the first voyage in a long series of expeditions. He carried on his work well beyond retirement age and contracted cancer and died in November 1928 following an operation.

== Expeditions ==
After studying at Tübingen and Freiburg, he went to East Africa in 1888, and during the revolt of the Arabs in 1890 entered the German corps of defense as a lieutenant, and was severely wounded at Lembula. After his recovery he joined the expedition of Emin Pasha to the lake region, was sent ahead from Undussuma to Lake Victoria, and reached the coast in July, 1892, at Bagamoyo, whence he returned to Germany with valuable cartographic material and rich collections, to which he added copiously on another trip to German East Africa, undertaken in 1893-94 by order of the government. In 1908-10 he was secretary of the Colonial Institute in Hamburg.

== Taxon named in his honor ==
Stuhlmann is remembered in the scientific names of a great many African plants, e.g., Warburgia stuhlmannii, Allanblackia stuhlmannii, Ficus stuhlmannii, and mammals, e.g., Cercopithecus mitis stuhlmanni.

Also, a species of African snake, Prosymna stuhlmanni, is named in his honor.

A fish, Alestes stuhlmannii is named in his honor by Georg Johann Pfeffer.

The Kingani mormyrid, Petrocephalus stuhlmanni Boulenger, 1909, is a species of electric fish in the family Mormyridae, found only in the Ruvu River and Wami in Tanzania.

== Publications ==
His publications include:

- Zoologische Ergebnisse einer in die Küstengebiete von Ostafrika unternommenen Reise 1888-90 (1893–1901)
- Mit Emin Pascha ins Herz von Afrika (1894)
- Beiträge zur Kulturgeschichte von Ostafrika (1909)
