= Cinnamodendron occhionianum =

Conservation status
- Least Concern (IUCN 3.1)

Scientific classification
- Kingdom: Plantae
- Clade: Embryophytes
- Clade: Tracheophytes
- Clade: Spermatophytes
- Clade: Angiosperms
- Clade: Magnoliids
- Order: Canellales
- Family: Canellaceae
- Genus: Cinnamodendron
- Species: C. occhionianum

Binomial name
- Cinnamodendron occhionianum F.Barros & J.Salazar

Species of flowering plant

Cinnamodendron occhionianum is a species of flowering plant in the family Canellaceae. It is a tree endemic to the state of São Paulo in southeastern Brazil.
