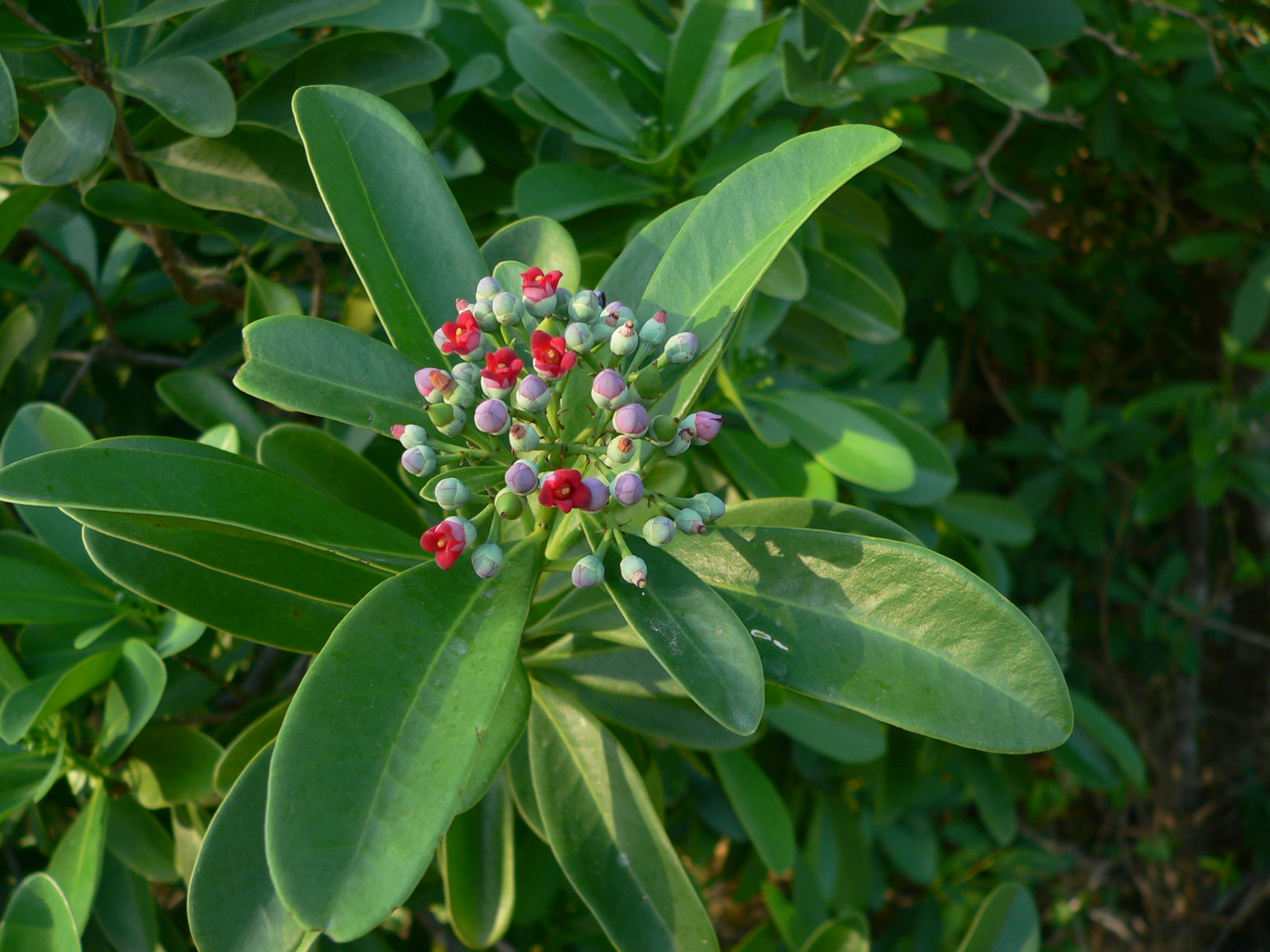

Conservation status
- Least Concern (IUCN 3.1)

Scientific classification
- Kingdom: Plantae
- Clade: Embryophytes
- Clade: Tracheophytes
- Clade: Angiosperms
- Clade: Magnoliids
- Order: Canellales
- Family: Canellaceae
- Genus: Canella; P. Browne (1756)
- Species: C. winterana

Binomial name
- Canella winterana (L.) Gaertn. (1788)

Synonyms
- Winterana L.; Canella alba Murray; Canella canella (L.) H.Karst.; Canella laurifolia Sweet; Canella obtusifolia Miers; Laurus winterana L.; Winterana canella L. (1753) (basionym); Winterana obtusifolia (Miers) Warb.

= Canella =

Genus of trees

Canella is a monospecific genus containing the species Canella winterana, a tree native to the Caribbean, south-eastern Mexico, southern Florida, and Venezuela. Its bark is used as a spice similar to cinnamon, giving rise to the common names cinnamon bark, wild cinnamon, and white cinnamon.

== Description ==
Flowers perfect, regular; sepals 3, imbricated, persistent; petals 5, imbricated; stamens monadelphous. Fruit baccate, indehiscent, 2 to 4-seeded.

A tree, with scaly aromatic bark, stout ashy gray branchlets conspicuously marked with large orbicular leaf-scars. Leaves petiolate, alternate, destitute of stipules, pinniveined, entire, pellucid-punctate, coriaceous. Flowers arranged in a many-flowered subcorymbose terminal or subterminal panicle composed of several dichotomously branched cymes from the axis of the upper leaves or of minute caducous bracts. Sepals suborbiculate, concave, coriaceous, erect, their margins ciliate. Petals hypogynous, in a single row on the slightly convex receptacle, oblong, concave, rounded at the extremity, fleshy, twice the length of the sepals, white or rose-colored. Stamens about twenty, hypogynous, the filaments connate into a tube crenulate at the summit, and slightly extended above the linear anthers, which are adnate to its outer face, and longitudinally two-valved. Ovary free, included in the androecium, cylindrical or oblong-conical, one-celled, with two parietal placentas, few-ovuled; style short, fleshy, the summit two or three-lobed, stigmatic; ovules arcuate, horizontal or descending, imperfectly anatropous, attached by a short funiculus. Fruit globular or slightly ovate, fleshy, minutely pointed with the base of the persistent style. Seeds reniform, suspended; testa thick, crustaceous, shining black; tegmen soft, membranaceous. Embryo curved, near the summit of the copious oleo-fleshy albumen, its radicle next the hilum; cotyledons oblong.

The wood of Canella is very heavy and exceedingly hard, strong, and close-grained, with numerous thin, inconspicuous medullary rays; it is dark red-brown, and the thick sapwood consists of 25 to 30 layers of annual growth, light brown or yellow in color. The specific gravity of the absolutely dry wood grown in Florida is 0.9893; a cubic foot of the dry wood weighs 61.65 pounds (27.96 kg).

Canella attains in Florida a height of 25 to 30 feet (7.6 to 9.1 m), with a straight trunk 8 to 10 inches (20 to 25 cm) in diameter. On the mountains of Jamaica, it is said to grow sometimes to the height of 50 feet (15 m). The principal branches are slender, horizontal, and spreading, forming a compact round-headed top. The light gray bark of the trunk is 1/8 in (3.2 mm) thick, the surface is broken into many short thick scales rarely more than 2–3 in (51–76 mm) long, and about twice the thickness of the pale yellow, aromatic inner bark. The leaves are obovate, round or slightly emarginate at the apex, and contracted into a short, stout, grooved petiole; they are 3.5–5 in (89–127 mm) long, 1.5–2 in (38–51 mm) broad, bright deep green, and lustrous. The flowers open in the autumn, and the fruit ripens in March and April, when it is bright crimson, soft, and fleshy, and is eaten by many birds.

== Name ==
Canella, the diminutive of the Latin canna, a cane or reed, was first applied to the bark of the Old World tree cassia, Cinnamomum aromaticum, from the form of a roll or quill which it assumed in drying, and was later transferred to the West Indian tree. The genus Canella was erected in 1756 by Patrick Browne. The species epithet winterana is an artifact from a period when this plant was confused with Winter's bark, Drimys winteri, which is itself named for William Winter.

== Distribution ==
Canella is widely distributed. Amongst the islands of the Caribbean, Canella is native to the Bahamas, Cayman Islands, Cuba, Hispaniola (Dominican Republic and Haiti), Jamaica, Leeward Islands, Puerto Rico, and the Windward Islands. It is also native to south-eastern Mexico and Venezuela.

In Florida, it is found in the Florida Keys where it is not uncommon. It is here where it was first discovered by J. L. Blodgett. It generally grows under the shade of larger trees in dense forests composed of Sideroxylon, Lysiloma, Swietenia, Bursera, Hypelate, Dipholis, and Nectandra.

Canella was one of the first American trees to attract the attention of Europeans, and it is mentioned in the accounts of many of the early voyages to America:

We found there a tree whose leaf had the finest smell of cloves that I have ever met with; it was like a laurel leaf, but not so large: but I think it was a species of laurel.

— Diego Álvarez Chanca, January 1494

The white bark, the brilliant deep green foliage, and crimson fruit make the Canella one of the most ornamental of the smaller south Florida trees. It was introduced into England in 1738, and was first cultivated in Europe by Philip Miller.
