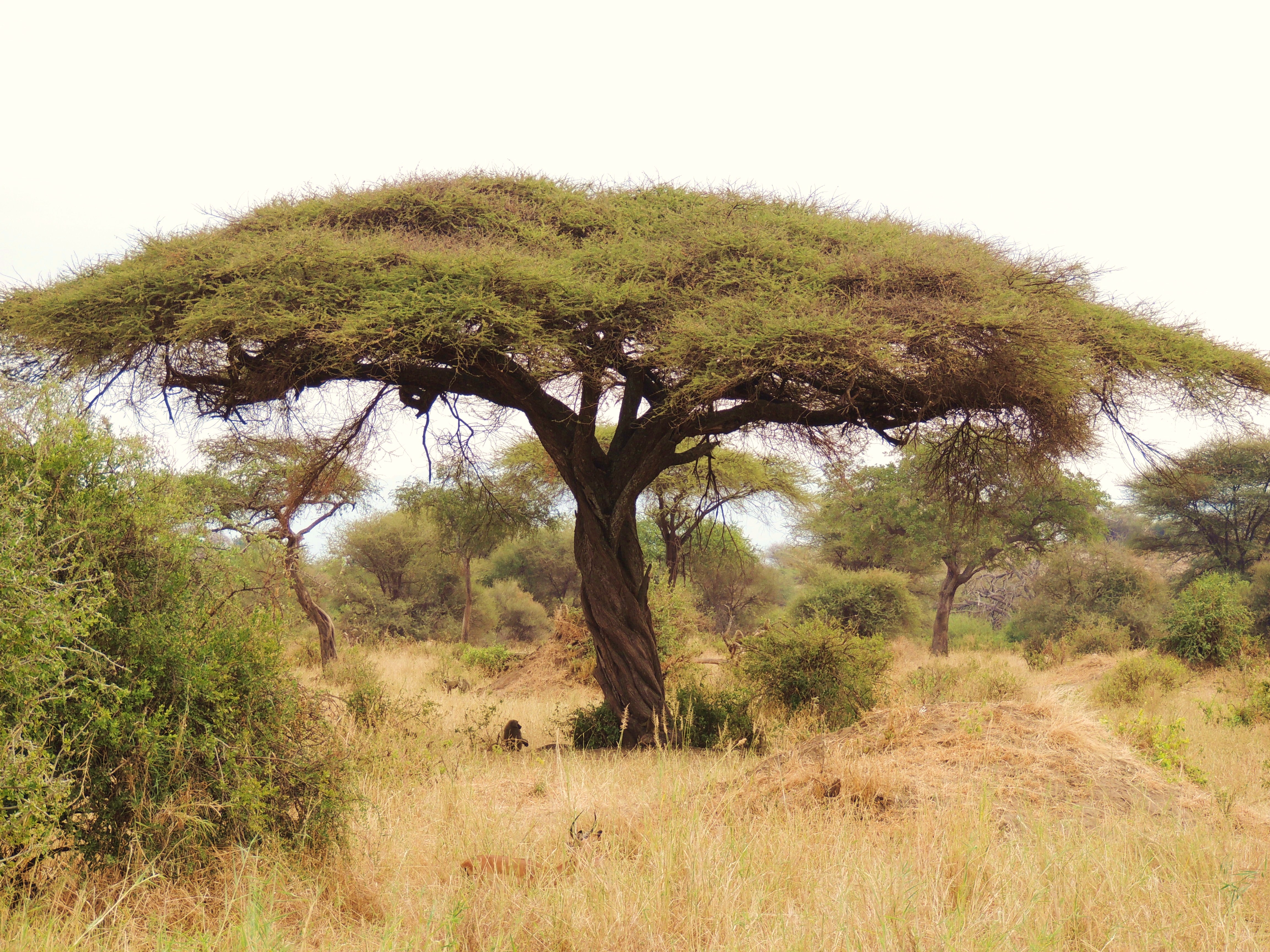
- Specimen of the nominate subspecies in Serengeti National Park

Conservation status
- Least Concern (IUCN 3.1)

Scientific classification
- Kingdom: Plantae
- Clade: Tracheophytes
- Clade: Angiosperms
- Clade: Eudicots
- Clade: Rosids
- Order: Fabales
- Family: Fabaceae
- Subfamily: Caesalpinioideae
- Clade: Mimosoid clade
- Genus: Vachellia
- Species: V. tortilis

Binomial name
- Vachellia tortilis (Forssk.) Galasso & Banfi

Subspecies and varieties
- Vachellia tortilis subsp. heteracantha (Burch.) Kyal. & Boatwr.; Vachellia tortilis subsp. raddiana (Savi) Kyal. & Boatwr.; var. pubescens (A.Chev.) Kyal. & Boatwr.; var. raddiana (Savi) Kyal. & Boatwr.; Vachellia tortilis subsp. spirocarpa (Hochst. ex. A.Rich.) Kyal. & Boatwr.; var. crinita (Chiov.) Kyal. & Boatwr.; var. spirocarpa (Hochst. ex. A.Rich.) Kyal. & Boatwr.; Vachellia tortilis subsp. tortilis (Forssk.) Galasso & Banfi
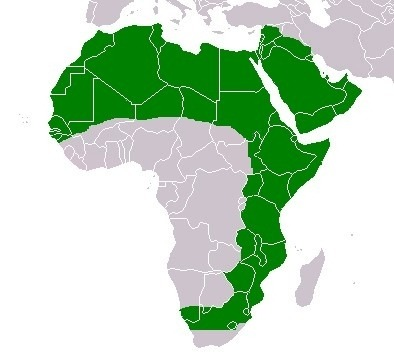
- Range of Vachellia tortilis

Synonyms
- Acacia raddiana Savi; Acacia tortilis (Forssk.) Hayne; Mimosa tortilis Forssk.; Vachellia tortilis (Forssk.) P.J.H.Hurter & Mabb.

= Vachellia tortilis =

Umbrella thorn acacia

Species of plant

Vachellia tortilis, widely known as Acacia tortilis but now attributed to the genus Vachellia in the Fabaceae subfamily Mimosoideae, is the umbrella thorn acacia, also known as umbrella thorn and Israeli babool, a medium to large canopied tree native to most of Africa, primarily to the savanna and Sahel of Africa (especially the Somali peninsula and Sudan), but also occurring in the Middle East.

== Distribution and growing conditions ==
Vachellia tortilis is widespread in Africa, being found in countries like Tunisia, Morocco, Uganda, Angola, Zimbabwe, Djibouti, and Botswana. It tends to grow in areas where temperatures vary from 0 to 50 °C (32 to 122 °F) and rainfall is anywhere from about 100–1,000 mm (3.9–39.4 in) per year.

== Characteristics ==
In extremely arid conditions, it may occur as a small, wiry bush. In good conditions, it grows up to 21 m (70 ft) in height. The tree carries leaves that grow to approx. 2.5 cm (1 in) in length with between 4 and 10 pair of pinnae each with up to 15 pairs of leaflets. Its most interesting feature is that it has pairs of thorns; one long, straight and pale, the second short, curved and dark. The flowers are small and white, highly aromatic, and occur in tight clusters. The seeds are produced in pods which are flat and coiled into a springlike structure.

The plant is known to tolerate high alkalinity, drought, high temperatures, sandy and stony soils, strongly sloped rooting surfaces, and to withstand sandblasting too. Also, plants older than two years have shown a degree of frost resistance.

== Importance ==
The pods and foliage, which grow prolifically on the tree, are used as fodder for desert grazing animals. The bark is often used as a string medium in Tanzania, and is a source for tannin. Gum from the tree is edible and can be used as gum arabic. Parts of the tree including roots, shoots, and pods are also often used by natives for a vast number of purposes including decorations, weapons, tools, and medicines. Its wood is also used for firewood, fencing, wheels for wagons, and furniture. Its thorny branches can be used to construct animal pens.

The Umbrella thorn is also an important species for rehabilitation of degraded arid land; it tolerates drought, wind, salinity and a wide range of soil types, and has the additional benefit of fixing nitrogen, an essential plant nutrient, in the soil via its interaction with symbiotic root bacteria.

=== Religious connotations ===
Some religious people believe that Vachellia wood was used exclusively by the Israelites in the bible in the building of the tabernacle and the tabernacle furniture, including the Ark of the Covenant.

It is also the tree under which the historic pledge of allegiance of Hudaybiya of Muhammad was held, as God says in the Quran, "Allah's Good Pleasure was on the Believers when they swore Fealty to thee under the Tree: He knew what was in their hearts, and He sent down Tranquillity to them; and He rewarded them with a speedy Victory;" Abu Zubayr said in Sahih Muslim that, "Umar was holding the latter's hand (when he was sitting) under the tree (called) Samura."

== Gallery ==
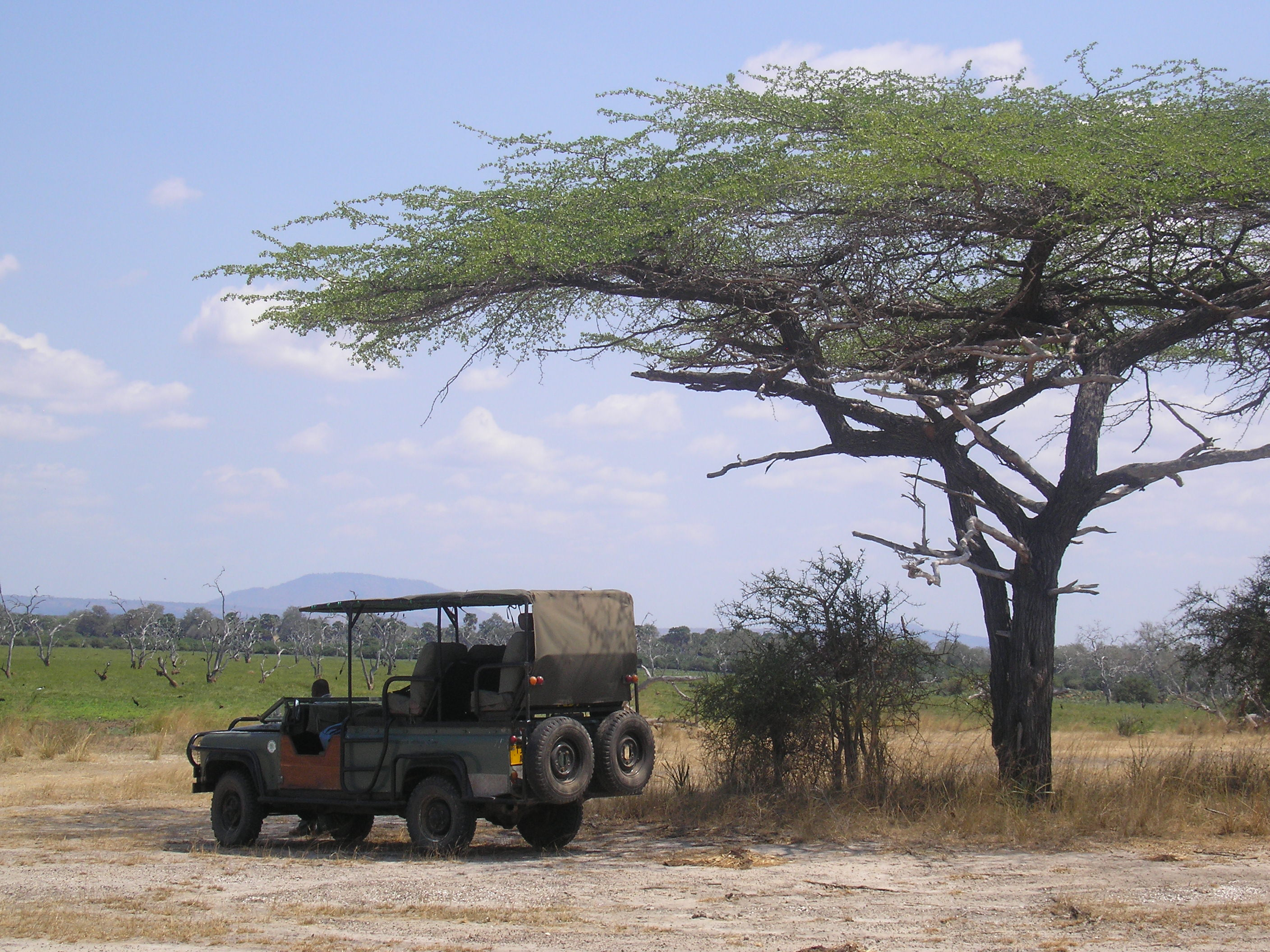
Vachellia tortilis at Selous Game Reserve.

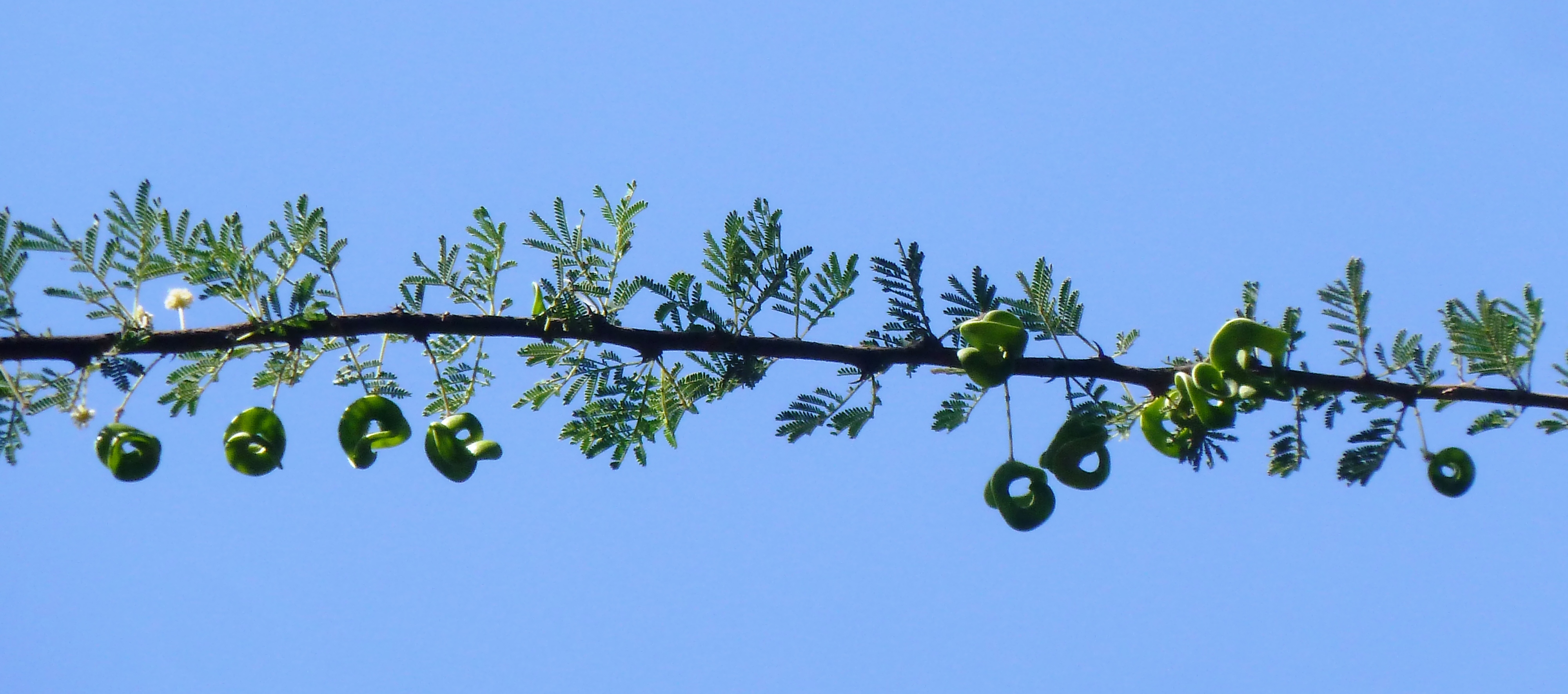
The pods are curled.

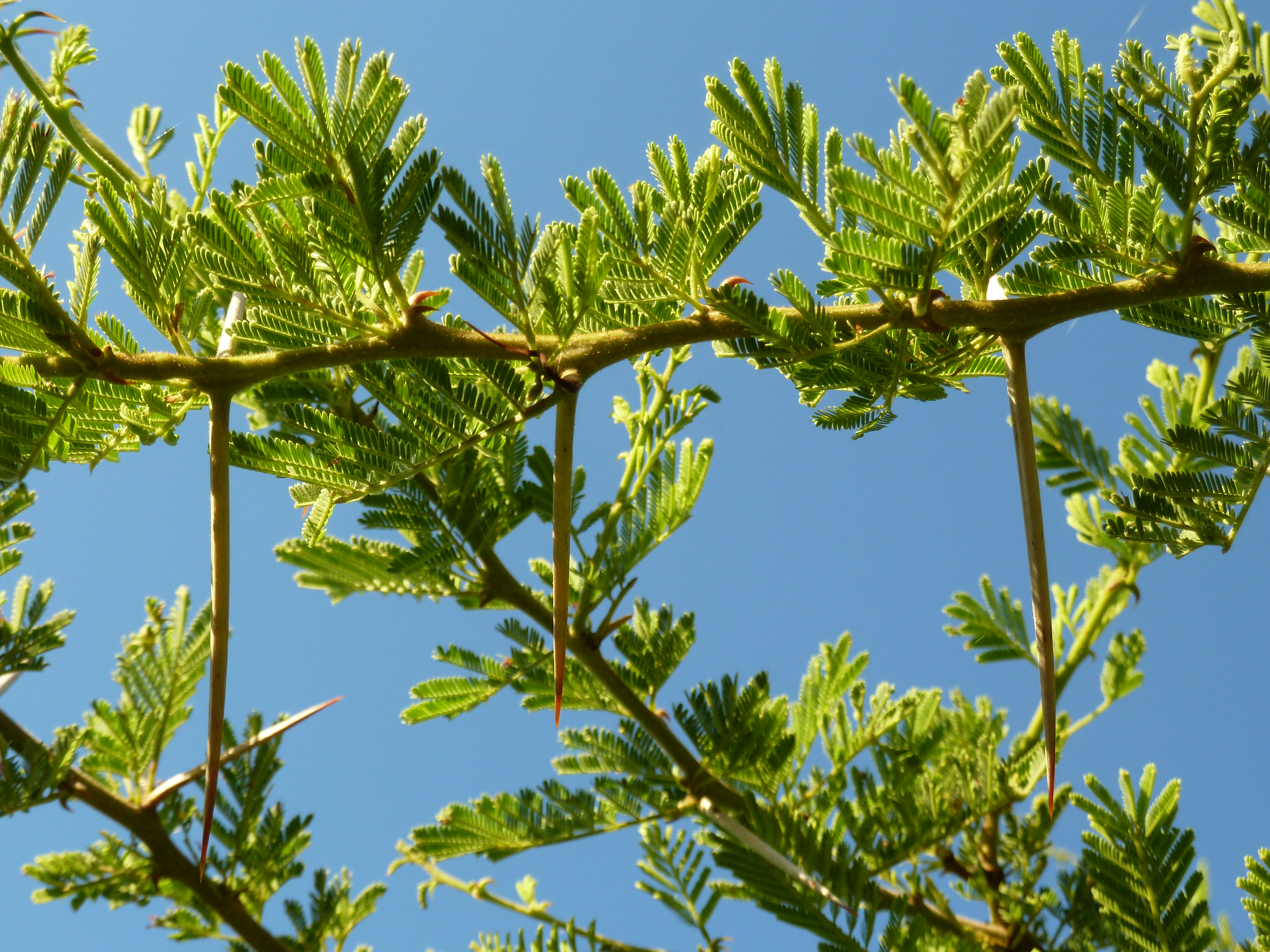
It has a combination of paired straight and paired hooked thorns, from which the Afrikaans name derives, meaning "hook and prick".

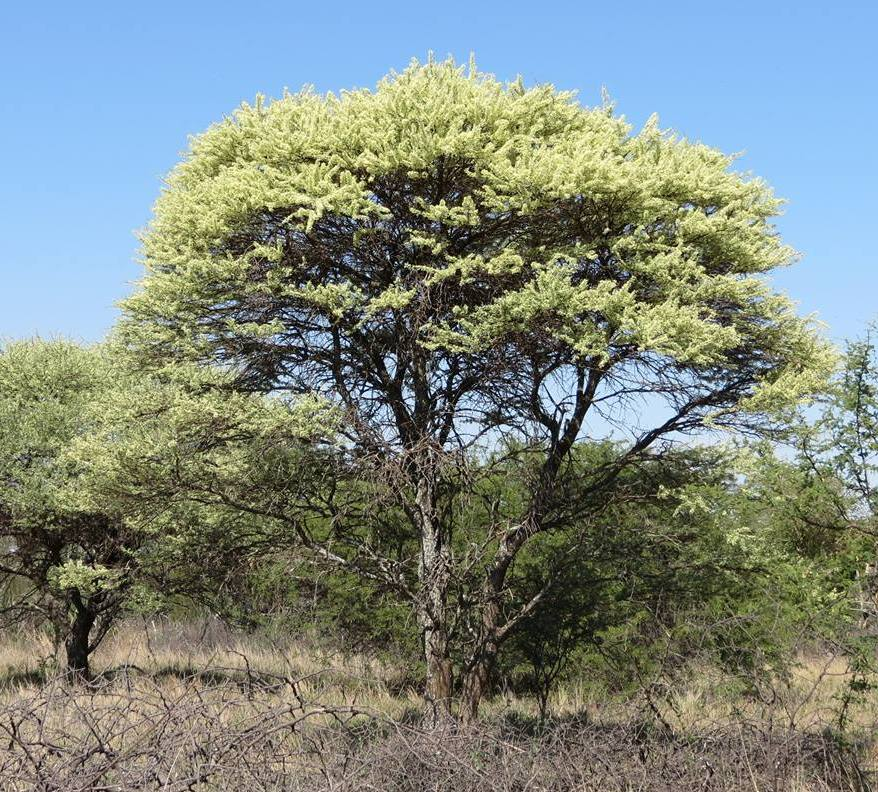
The southern subspecies heteracantha, here seen in flower, is smaller and often without a spreading crown.

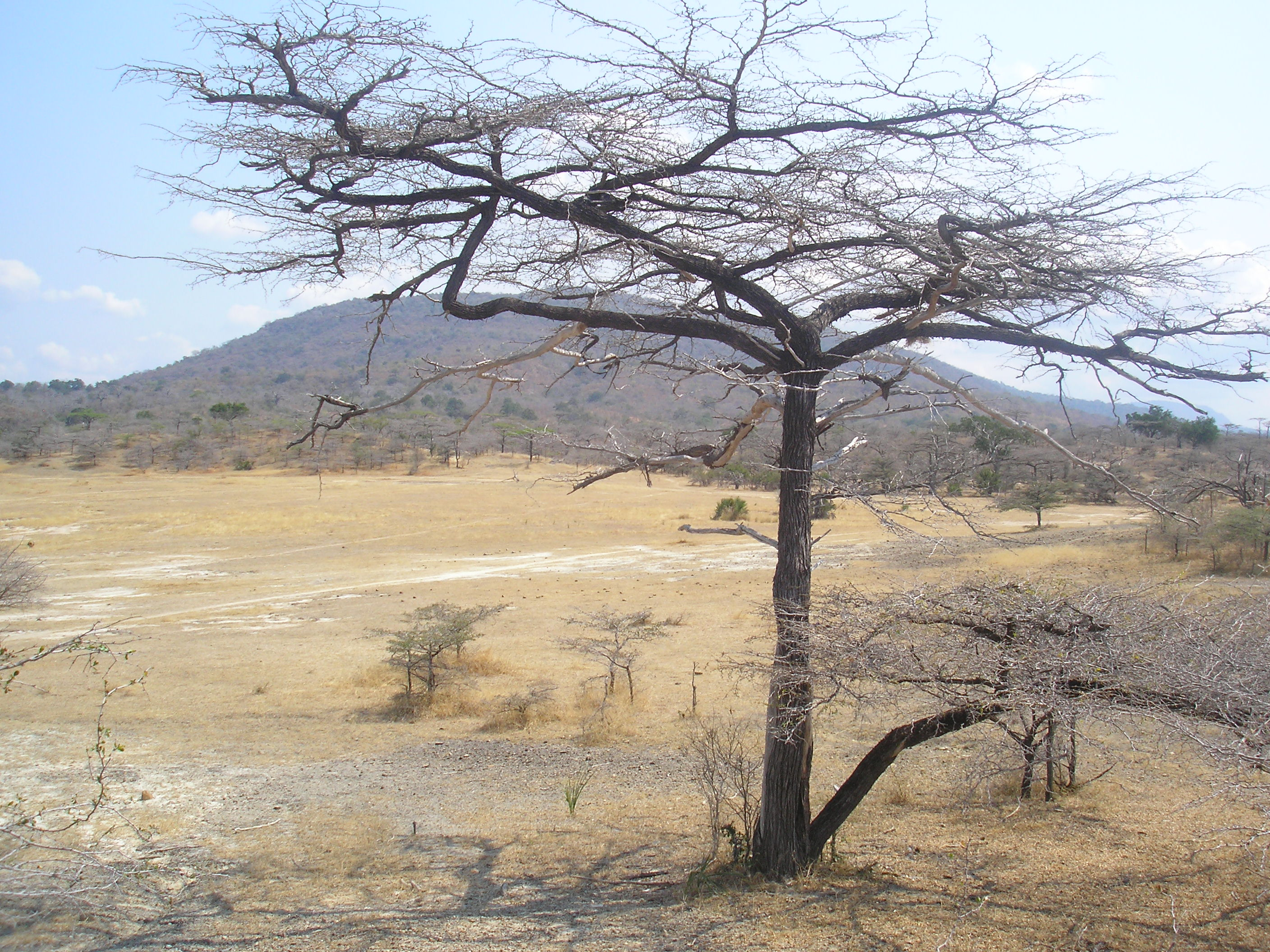
Vachellia tortilis in Tanzania.
