= Cinnamosma madagascariensis =

Conservation status
- Least Concern (IUCN 3.1)

Scientific classification
- Kingdom: Plantae
- Clade: Embryophytes
- Clade: Tracheophytes
- Clade: Spermatophytes
- Clade: Angiosperms
- Clade: Magnoliids
- Order: Canellales
- Family: Canellaceae
- Genus: Cinnamosma
- Species: C. madagascariensis

Binomial name
- Cinnamosma madagascariensis Danguy

Varieties
- Cinnamosma madagascariensis var. madagascariensis; Cinnamosma madagascariensis var. namoronensis H.Perrier

Species of flowering plant

Cinnamosma madagascariensis is a species of flowering plant in the family Canellaceae. It is endemic to Madagascar., where it is known as sakaihazo.

== Description ==
Cinnamosma madagascariensis is a shrub or tree which grows 3 to 20 meters tall.

== Range and habitat ==
Cinnamosma madagascariensis is found in northern and eastern Madagascar, in the provinces of Antsiranana, Fianarantsoa, Toamasina and Toliara. It grows in humid littoral, lowland, and montane forests, in dry forests and thickets on limestone, and in wooded grassland, between 90 and 2000 meters elevation. Its range includes the Montagne des Français protected area. The species' estimated area of occupancy (AOO) is 72 km^{2}, but may be larger due to under-sampling.

== Uses ==
All parts of the plant are used in medicine, particularly the bark which is used to treat tooth decay and epilepsy. The wood is used in construction, woodwork, household objects, and firewood.
