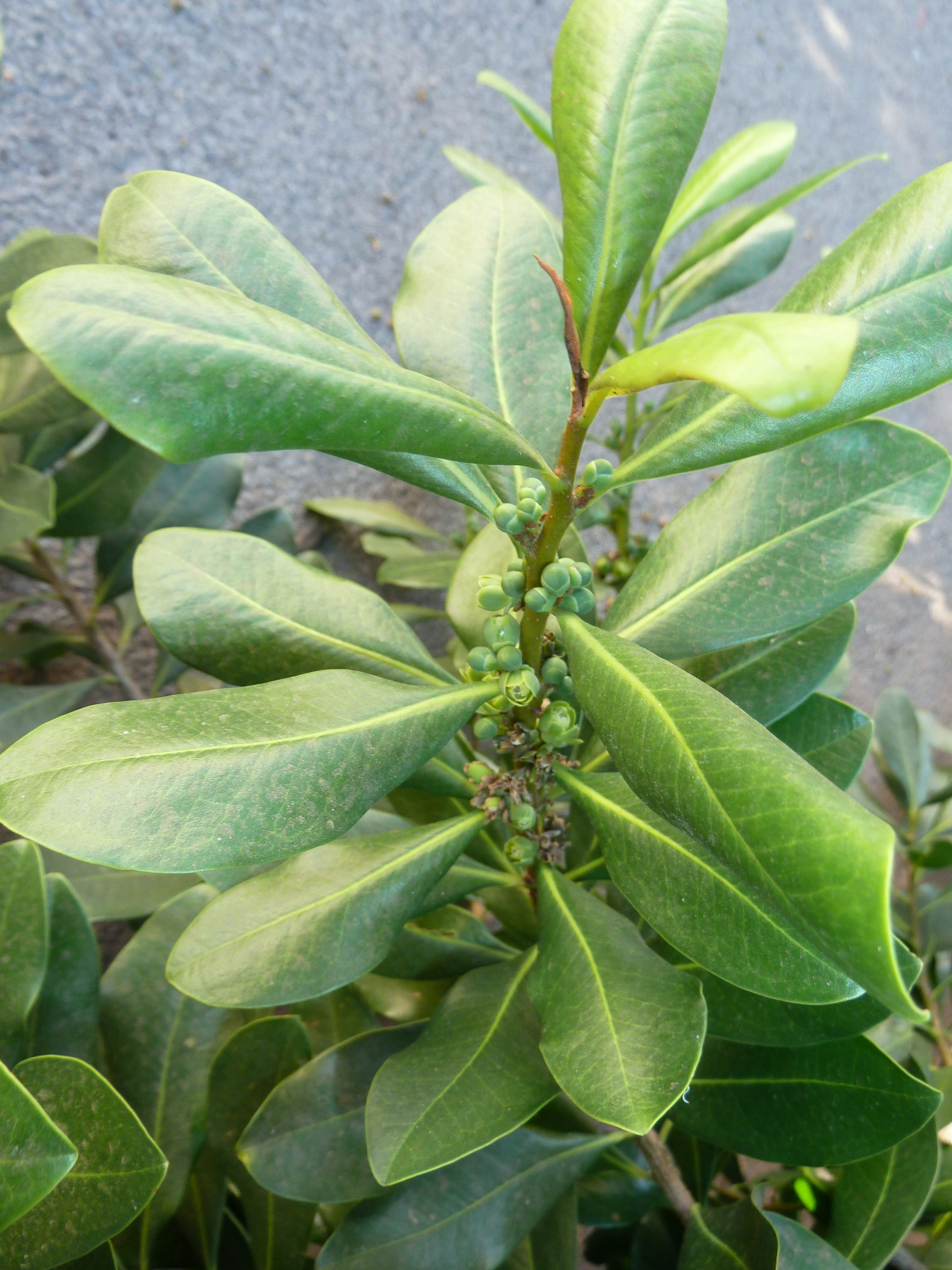
- Foliage and flowers of W. salutaris

Scientific classification
- Kingdom: Plantae
- Clade: Embryophytes
- Clade: Tracheophytes
- Clade: Spermatophytes
- Clade: Angiosperms
- Clade: Magnoliids
- Order: Canellales
- Family: Canellaceae
- Genus: Warburgia; Engl.

Synonyms
- Chibaca G.Bertol.; Dawea Sprague ex Dawe

= Warburgia =

Genus of flowering plants

Warburgia is a genus of flowering plants in the family Canellaceae described in 1895. It was named for the German botanist Otto Warburg. It is native to eastern and southern Africa.

All four species have medicinal uses. Extracts of Warburgia ugandensis have been reported to show some antimalarial properties in animal models.

Species

1. Warburgia elongata Verdc. - Tanzania
2. Warburgia salutaris (Bertol.f.) Chiov. - Zimbabwe, Mozambique, Limpopo, Mpumalanga, KwaZulu-Natal
3. Warburgia stuhlmannii Engl. - Tanzania, Kenya
4. Warburgia ugandensis Sprague - Uganda, Kenya, Tanzania, Zaire, Ethiopia to Malawi
