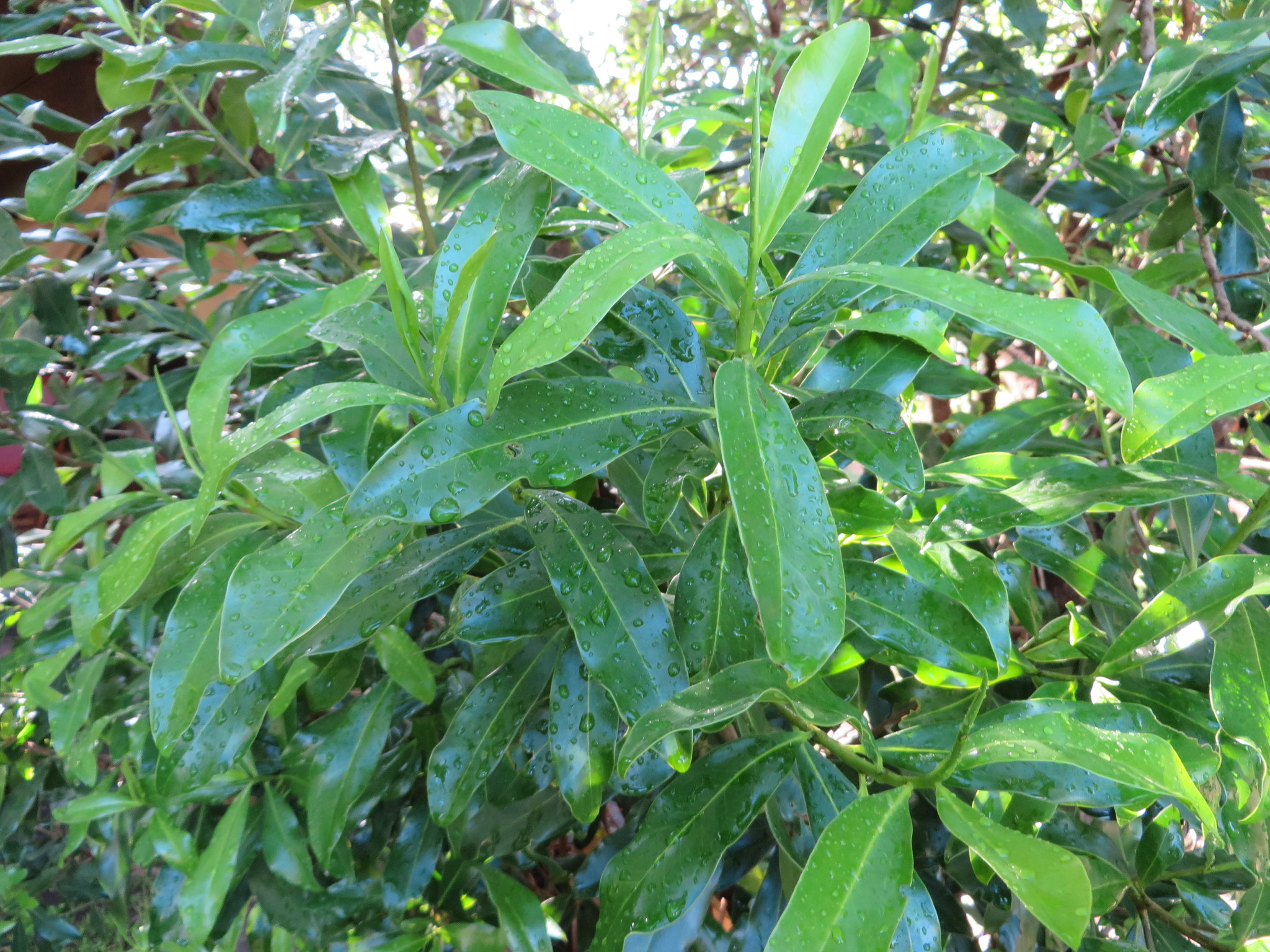

Conservation status
- Critically Endangered (IUCN 2.3)

Scientific classification
- Kingdom: Plantae
- Clade: Embryophytes
- Clade: Tracheophytes
- Clade: Spermatophytes
- Clade: Angiosperms
- Clade: Magnoliids
- Order: Canellales
- Family: Canellaceae
- Genus: Warburgia
- Species: W. ugandensis

Binomial name
- Warburgia ugandensis Sprague

Synonyms
- Warburgia breyeri Pott

= Warburgia ugandensis =

Species of tree

Warburgia ugandensis, also known as Ugandan greenheart or simply greenheart tree, is a species of evergreen tree native to East Africa. Countries in which the plant species is found include Kenya, Tanzania and Uganda. The wood is resistant to insect attack and very strong. It was commonly used for the yoke pole of ox-wagons, the Disselboom. Early Indian immigrants to Kenya, working on the construction of the railway, used the leaves to flavor their curries before the chilli plant was commonly introduced. The flavor is hot and subtly different from chillies.

Extracts of W. ugandensis have been reported to show some antimalarial, antifungal, and antibacterial properties in vitro or in animal models.

Unsustainable overharvesting of the bark reduced the population of the longifolia subspecies to the Rondo Forest Reserve in Tanzania, which prompted the IUCN to list it as vulnerable in its Red List of Threatened Species.
