= Alestes stuhlmannii =

Conservation status
- Least Concern (IUCN 3.1)

Scientific classification
- Kingdom: Animalia
- Phylum: Chordata
- Class: Actinopterygii
- Order: Characiformes
- Family: Alestidae
- Genus: Alestes
- Species: A. stuhlmannii

Binomial name
- Alestes stuhlmannii Pfeffer, 1896

Synonyms
- Alestes adolfi Steindachner, 1914

Species of fish

Alestes stuhlmannii is a species of fish in the family Alestidae. It is endemic to the Ulanga River in Morogoro Region of Tanzania.

Named in honor of Franz Stuhlmann (1863–1928), a German zoologist and African explorer, who collected the type specimen in Tanzania.
