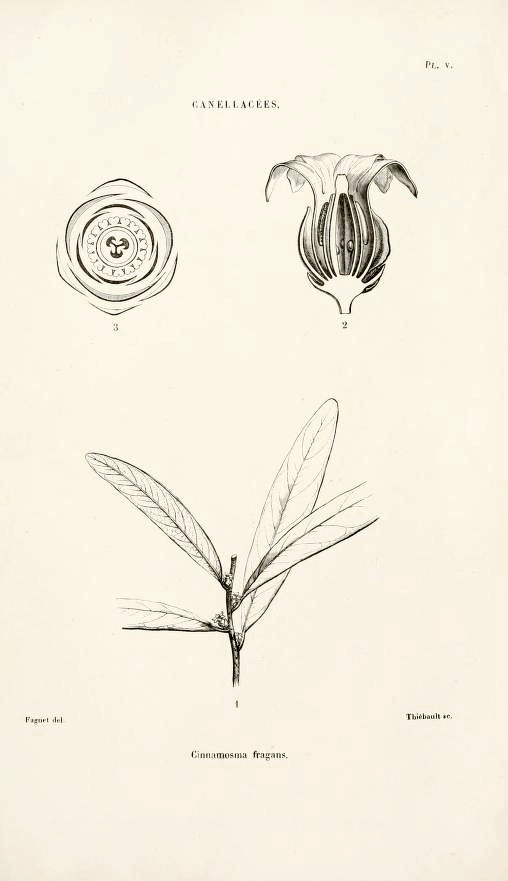
- Cinnamosma fragrans, original plate of Baillon, in Adansonia 7 pl 5 1867

Scientific classification
- Kingdom: Plantae
- Clade: Tracheophytes
- Clade: Angiosperms
- Clade: Magnoliids
- Order: Canellales
- Family: Canellaceae
- Genus: Cinnamosma; Baill.

= Cinnamosma =

Genus of flowering plants

Cinnamosma is a genus of plants in family Canellaceae described as a genus in 1867.

Cinnamosma is endemic to Madagascar.

Species

1. Cinnamosma fragrans Baill.
2. Cinnamosma macrocarpa H.Perrier
3. Cinnamosma madagascariensis Danguy
