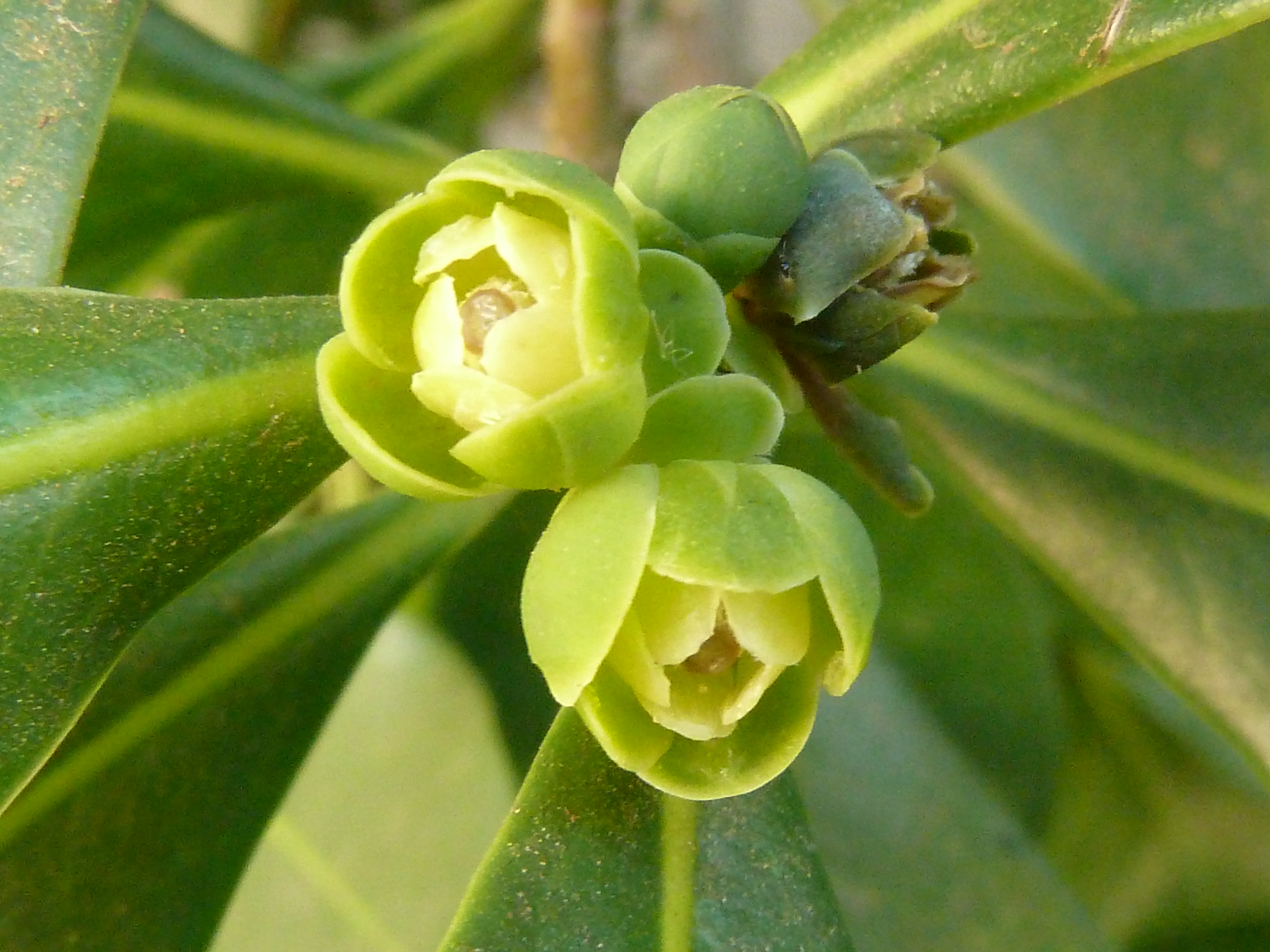

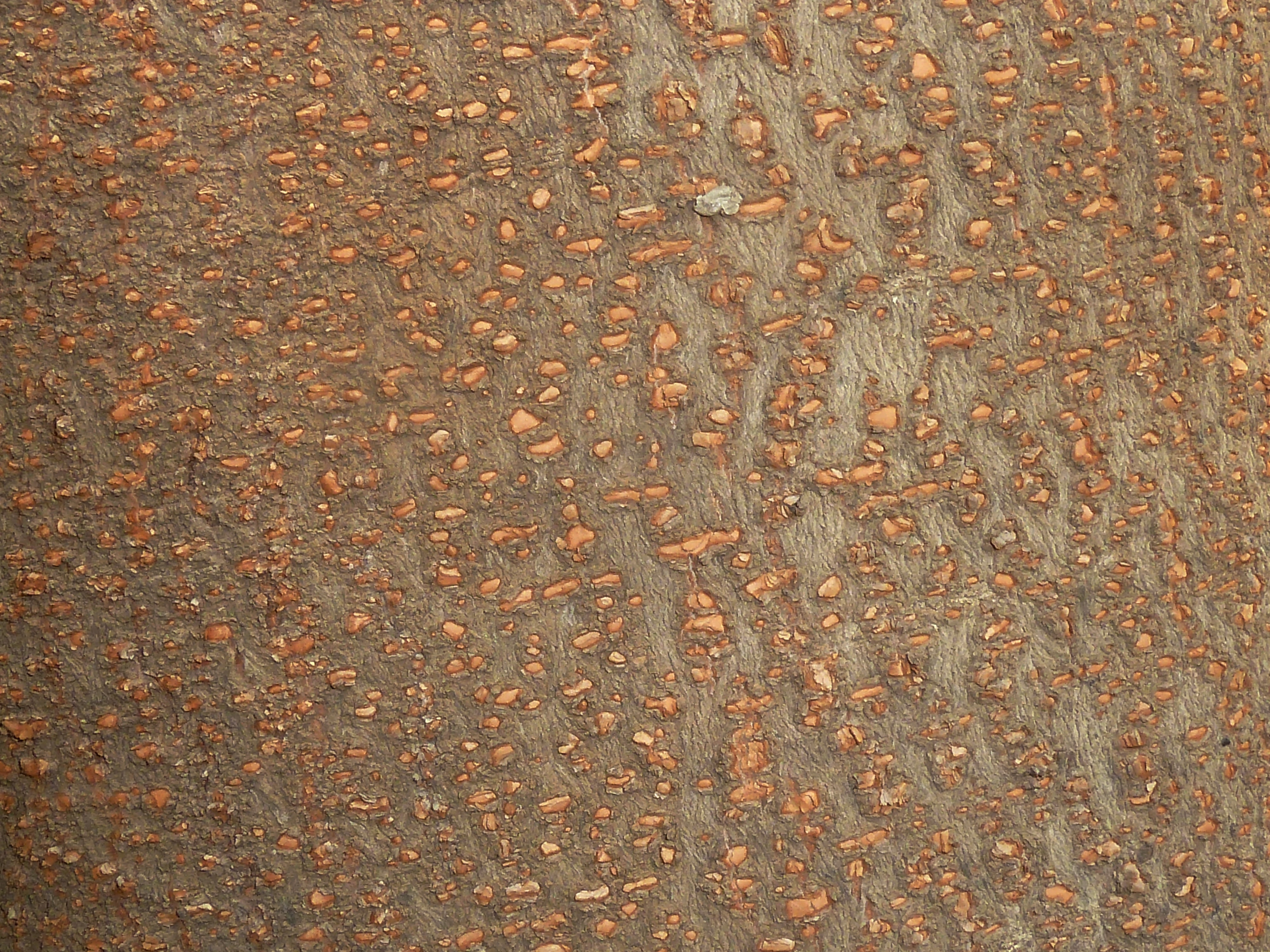

Conservation status
- Endangered (IUCN 2.3)

Scientific classification
- Kingdom: Plantae
- Clade: Embryophytes
- Clade: Tracheophytes
- Clade: Angiosperms
- Clade: Magnoliids
- Order: Canellales
- Family: Canellaceae
- Genus: Warburgia
- Species: W. salutaris

Binomial name
- Warburgia salutaris (G.Bertol.) Chiov.

Synonyms
- Chibaca salutaris G.Bertol.; Warburgia breyeri R.Pott

= Warburgia salutaris =

Species of tree

Warburgia salutaris (pepper-bark tree, Afrikaans: Peperbasboom, Sotho: Molaka, Venda: Mulanga, Zulu: Isibaha) is a species of tree in the family Canellaceae. It is native to southwestern Africa, including Mozambique, Zimbabwe, and KwaZulu-Natal the Northern Provinces of South Africa. It is threatened by habitat loss. It is a popular medicinal plant and is overharvested in the wild, another reason for its endangerment. The Pepper-bark tree is a protected tree in South Africa. Various projects are investigating methods of propagation under controlled conditions with subsequent planting in the wild.

This is an erect tree growing up to about ten metres in maximum height, but known to reach 20 metres at times. It has a thick canopy of aromatic, shiny green leaves. The evergreen leaf blades are lance-shaped, measuring up to 11 cm long by 3 wide. The flowers have ten yellow-green petals. They are each just under a centimeter long and are solitary or borne in small clusters of up to 3. The fruit is a berry, leathery purple or black in color when ripe, measuring up to 4 cm wide.

The leaves are used to add peppery flavoring to food and tea. The bitter taste of the tree's bark and leaves is due to the presence of iridoids. The aromatic, oily, yellowish wood is used for firewood.

The tree is also used as a shade tree.

== Traditional medicine ==
This plant is used medicinally by the Maasai people to treat malaria. It is used as a snuff or smoked for respiratory complaints such as common cold and cough. The bark can be purchased at markets in Tanzania, and elsewhere. Moreover, "Dried bark is chewed and the juice swallowed, thus acting as remedy for stomach-ache, constipation, coughs, fever, toothache, muscle pains, weak joints, and general body pains."

== Recent studies ==
Recent studies done at the University of Johannesburg have shown that a compound extract from the bark of Warburgia salutaris, called Iso-Mukaadial Acetate, is a potential new antidiabetic agent.

== Gallery ==
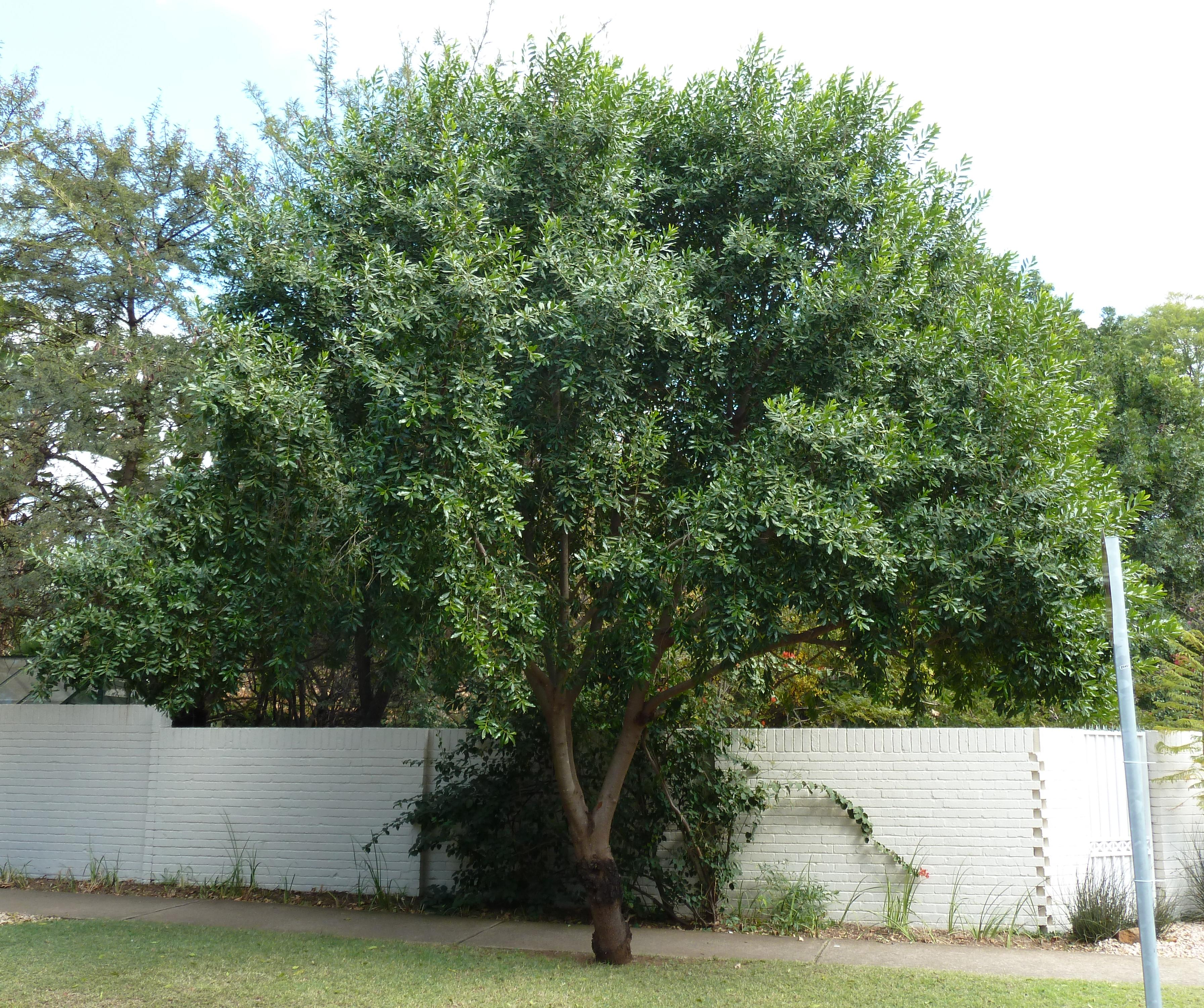
habit

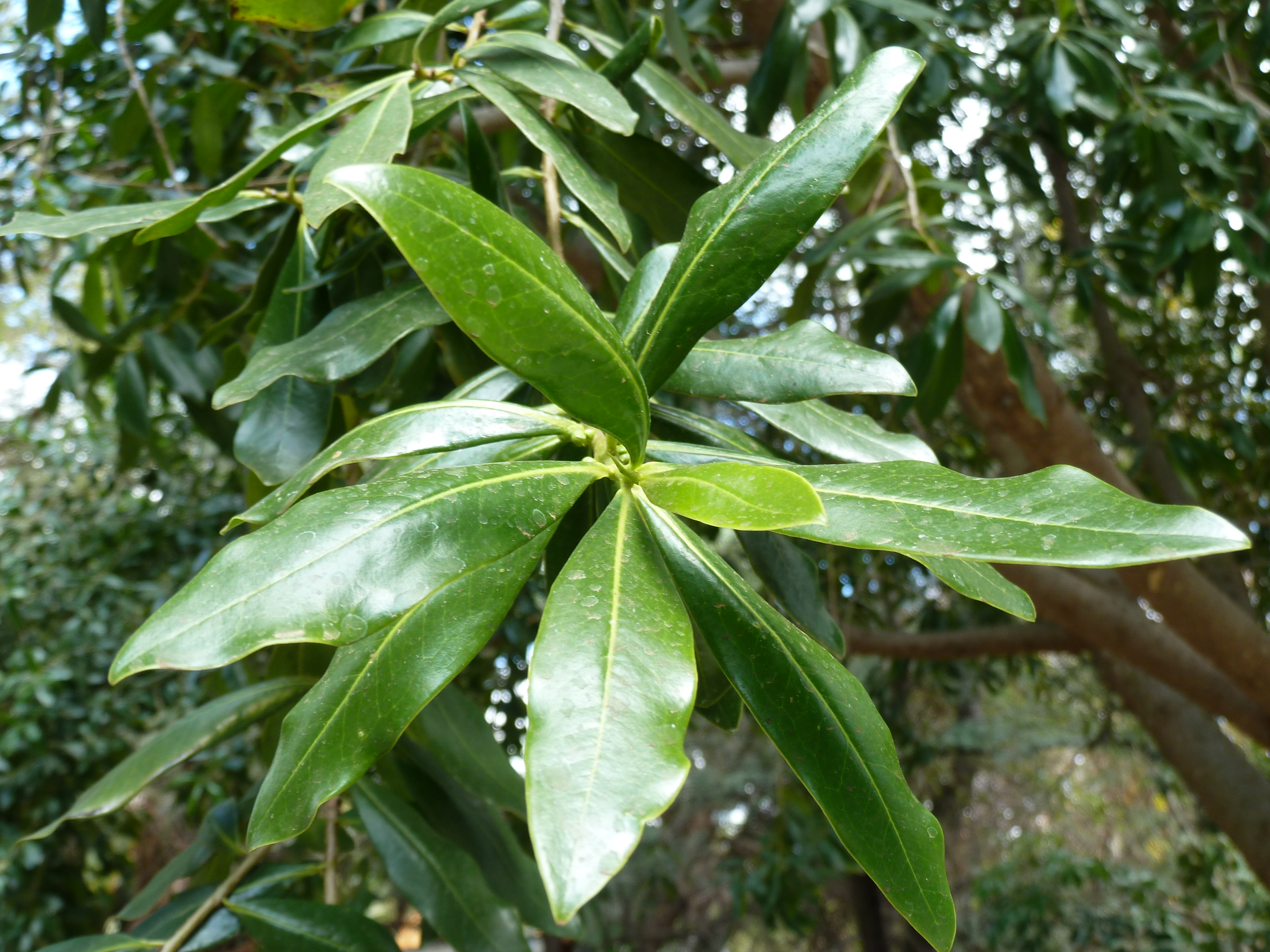
foliage

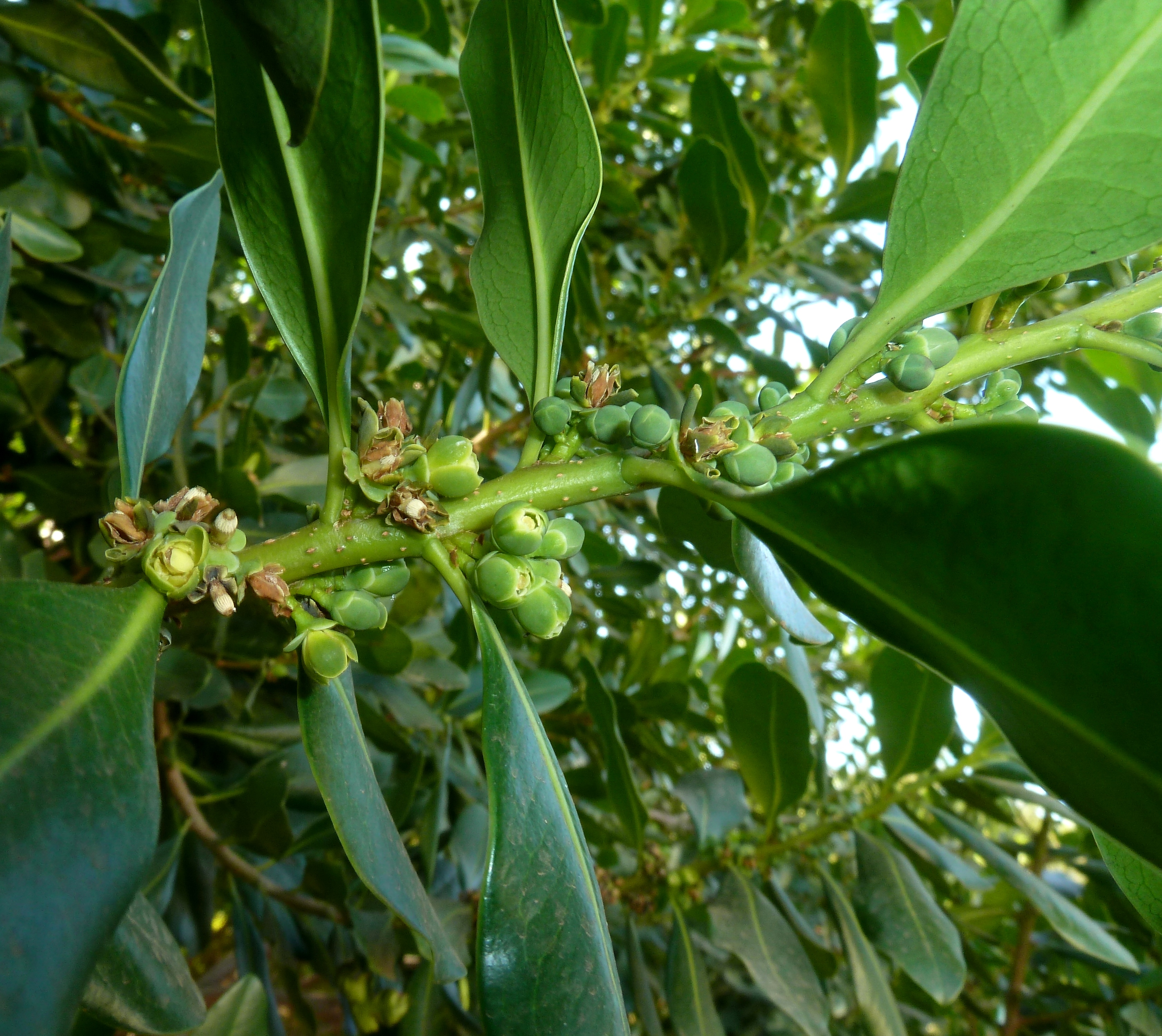
flowering branch

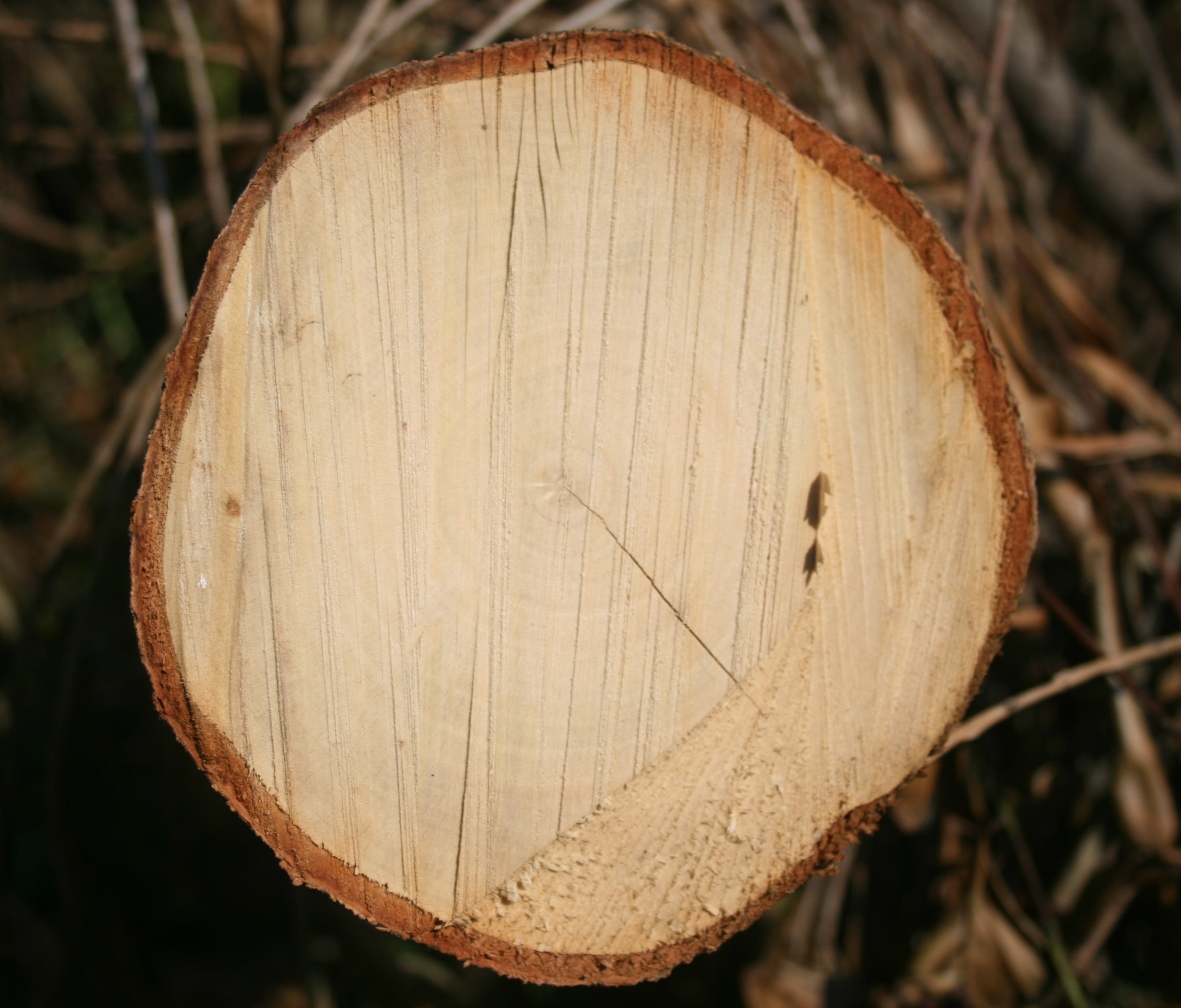
cross-section of wood and bark
