= Cinnamodendron axillare =

Conservation status
- Endangered (IUCN 3.1)

Scientific classification
- Kingdom: Plantae
- Clade: Embryophytes
- Clade: Tracheophytes
- Clade: Spermatophytes
- Clade: Angiosperms
- Clade: Magnoliids
- Order: Canellales
- Family: Canellaceae
- Genus: Cinnamodendron
- Species: C. axillare

Binomial name
- Cinnamodendron axillare (Nees) Endl. ex Walp.

Synonyms
- Canella axillaris Nees; Drimys vascularis P.Parm.

Species of flowering plant

Cinnamodendron axillare is a species of flowering plant in the family Canellaceae. It is a tree endemic to the state of Rio de Janeiro in southeastern Brazil.
