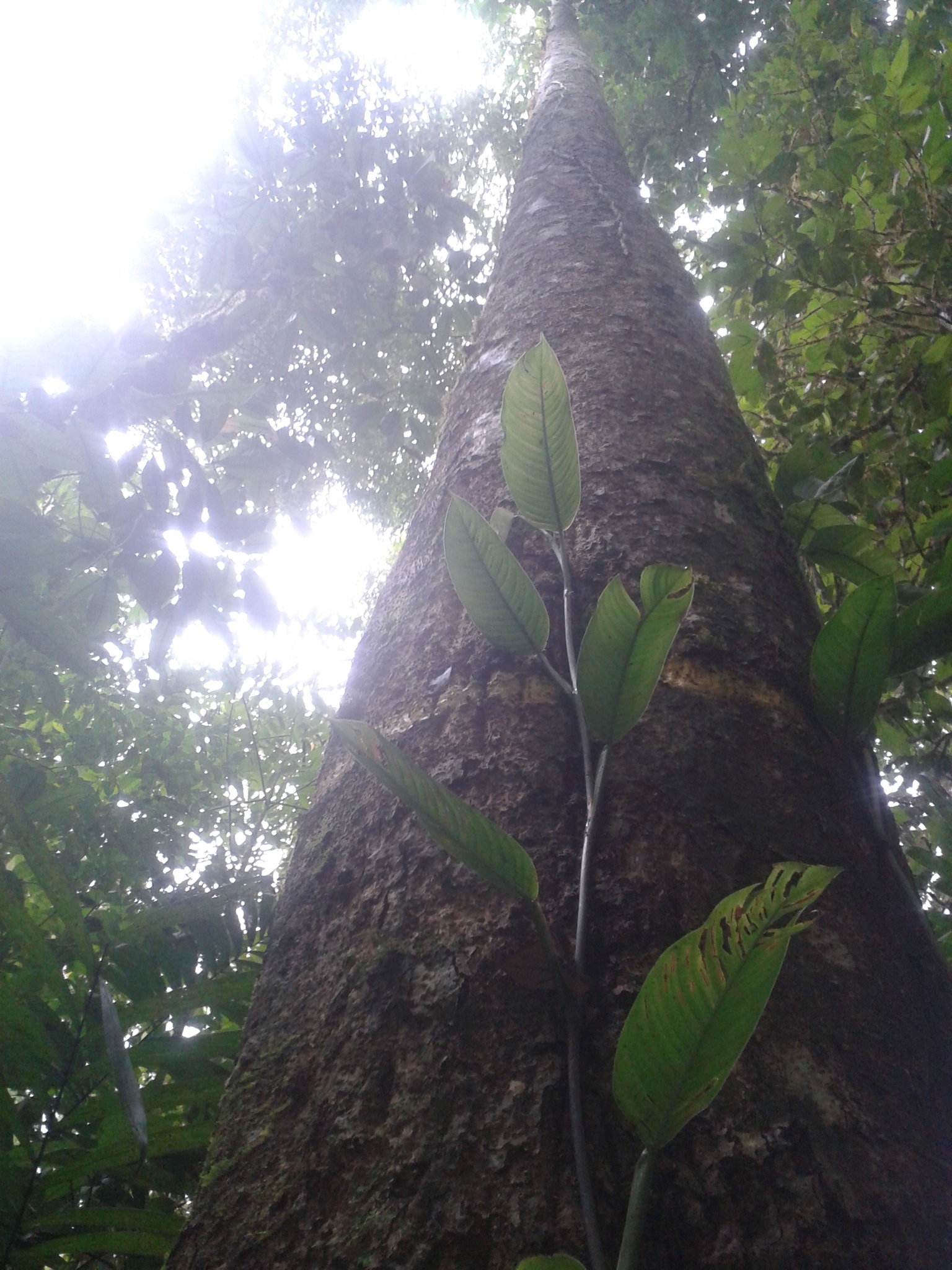
- Pleodendron costaricense

Scientific classification
- Kingdom: Plantae
- Clade: Tracheophytes
- Clade: Angiosperms
- Clade: Magnoliids
- Order: Canellales
- Family: Canellaceae
- Genus: Pleodendron; Tiegh.

= Pleodendron =

Genus of flowering plants

Pleodendron is a genus of plants in family Canellaceae described as a genus in 1899.

Pleodendron is native to Central America and the West Indies.

Species

1. Pleodendron costaricense N.Zamora, Hammel & Aguilar - Costa Rica
2. Pleodendron ekmanii Urb. - Haiti
3. Pleodendron macranthum (Baill.) Tiegh. - Puerto Rico
