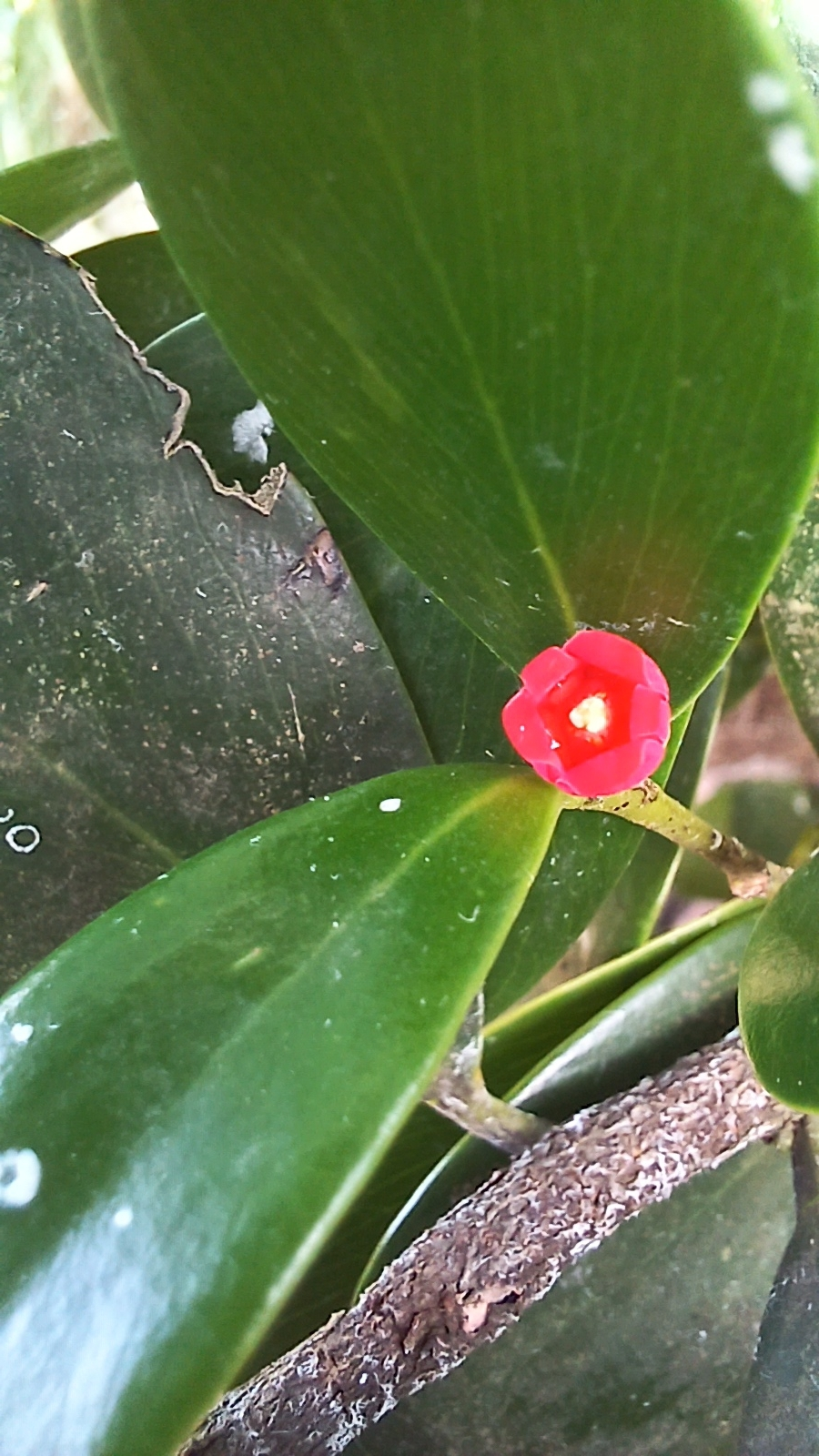
- Cinnamodendron ekmanii

Scientific classification
- Kingdom: Plantae
- Clade: Embryophytes
- Clade: Tracheophytes
- Clade: Spermatophytes
- Clade: Angiosperms
- Clade: Magnoliids
- Order: Canellales
- Family: Canellaceae
- Genus: Cinnamodendron; Endl.

Synonyms
- Capsicodendron Hoehne

= Cinnamodendron =

Genus of flowering plants

Cinnamodendron is a genus of flowering plants in family Canellaceae described as a genus in 1840.

Cinnamodendron is native to South America and the West Indies.

== Species ==
12 species are accepted.

- Cinnamodendron angustifolium Sleumer – Haiti (Massif de la Hotte)
- Cinnamodendron axillare (Nees) Endl. ex Walp. – Brazil (Rio de Janeiro})
- Cinnamodendron brasiliense J.Salazar & F.Barros – Brazil (São Paulo
- Cinnamodendron catarinense J.Salazar & F.Barros – Brazil (Santa Catarina)
- Cinnamodendron corticosum Miers – Jamaica
- Cinnamodendron cubense Urb. – Cuba
- Cinnamodendron dinisii Schwacke – southern Brazil
- Cinnamodendron ekmanii Sleumer – Dominican Republic
- Cinnamodendron occhionianum F.Barros & J.Salazar – Brazil (São Paulo)
- Cinnamodendron sampaioanum Occhioni – Brazil (Rio de Janeiro)
- Cinnamodendron tenuifolium Uittien – Suriname
- Cinnamodendron venezuelense Steyerm. – Venezuela (Monagas)
