= Cinnamodendron corticosum =

Conservation status
- Vulnerable (IUCN 3.1)

Scientific classification
- Kingdom: Plantae
- Clade: Tracheophytes
- Clade: Angiosperms
- Clade: Magnoliids
- Order: Canellales
- Family: Canellaceae
- Genus: Cinnamodendron
- Species: C. corticosum

Binomial name
- Cinnamodendron corticosum Miers

Synonyms
- Heterotypic Synonyms: Cinnamodendron rubrum Griseb.

Species of flowering plant

Cinnamodendron corticosum is a species of flowering plant in the family Canellaceae. It is a tree endemic to Jamaica.

== Distribution and habitat ==
It has been observed growing in rainforests, at elevations between 300 and 1,000 meters.
