= Cinnamosma macrocarpa =

Conservation status
- Vulnerable (IUCN 3.1)

Scientific classification
- Kingdom: Plantae
- Clade: Embryophytes
- Clade: Tracheophytes
- Clade: Spermatophytes
- Clade: Angiosperms
- Clade: Magnoliids
- Order: Canellales
- Family: Canellaceae
- Genus: Cinnamosma
- Species: C. macrocarpa

Binomial name
- Cinnamosma macrocarpa H.Perrier

Species of flowering plant

Cinnamosma macrocarpa is a species of flowering plant in the family Canellaceae. It is endemic to Madagascar.

== Description ==
Cinnamosma macrocarpa is a shrub or small tree, growing 3 to 18 meters tall.

== Range and habitat ==
Cinnamosma macrocarpa is native to eastern and northwestern Madagascar, in the provinces of Antsiranana, Fianarantsoa, Toamasina and Toliara.

it grows in humid and subhumid littoral forests and on rocky soil in lowland and montane forests from sea level to 1,180 meters elevation.

There are ten known subpopulations of the species. It is affected by habitat loss from logging, conversion of land to agriculture, and mining. Its population is declining, and its conservation status is assessed as vulnerable.
