= Frost resistance =

Ability of plants to withstand temperatures below zero degree Celsius

Frost resistance is the ability of plants to survive cold temperatures. Generally, land plants of the Northern Hemisphere have higher frost resistance than those of the Southern Hemisphere. An example of a frost resistant plant is Drimys winteri which is more frost-tolerant than naturally occurring conifers and vessel-bearing angiosperms such as the Nothofagus that can be found in its range in southern South America.

The physiological process of cold acclimatization is induced in fall and early winter by low above- zero temperatures (cold) and includes complex reprogramming of the cellular environment to induce enhanced frost tolerance. Temperate climate fruit trees reach their highest resistance in the middle of winter. Since freezing belongs to dehydration stresses, cold acclimation process is associated with an enhanced accumulation of osmolytes (sugars, proline, polyamines, and hydrophilic proteins). The loss of frost resistance occurs after warming. Rapid temperature fluctuations during winter deharden trees and increase the risk of spring damage. Species that bloom first even before the leaves develop like apricots or peaches, are particularly vulnerable to damage. The reproductive organs, due to their abundant hydration, are easily damaged, leading to large losses in the cultivation of fruit trees and shrubs.
