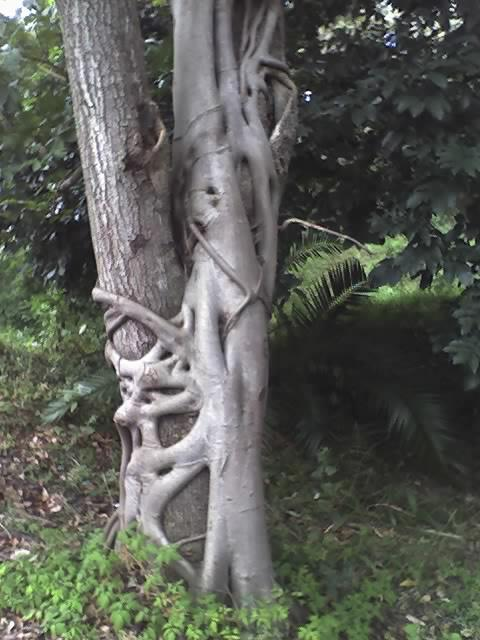
- Ficus stuhlmannii wrapped around Bridelia micrantha

Conservation status
- Least Concern (IUCN 3.1)

Scientific classification
- Kingdom: Plantae
- Clade: Tracheophytes
- Clade: Angiosperms
- Clade: Eudicots
- Clade: Rosids
- Order: Rosales
- Family: Moraceae
- Genus: Ficus
- Species: F. stuhlmannii

Binomial name
- Ficus stuhlmannii Warb.

Synonyms
- Ficus dar-es-salani Hutch.; Ficus homblei De Wild.; Ficus howardiana Sim

= Ficus stuhlmannii =

Species of flowering plant

Ficus stuhlmannii is a tree in the family Moraceae. It is commonly known as the lowveld fig. These trees are distributed from eastern and southeastern tropical Africa to KwaZulu-Natal in South Africa, where they grow in savanna.

The species was described by Otto Warburg in 1894.
