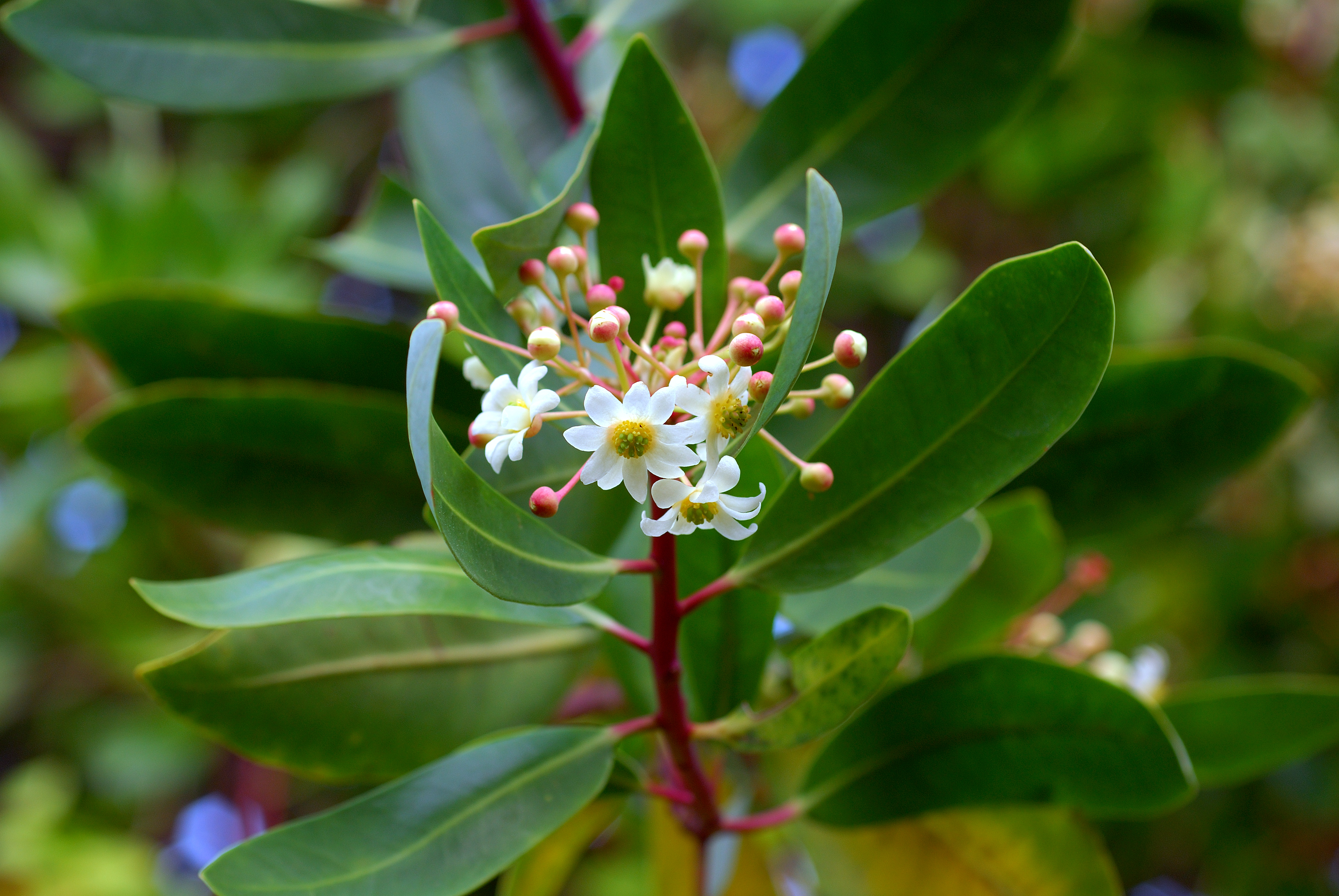

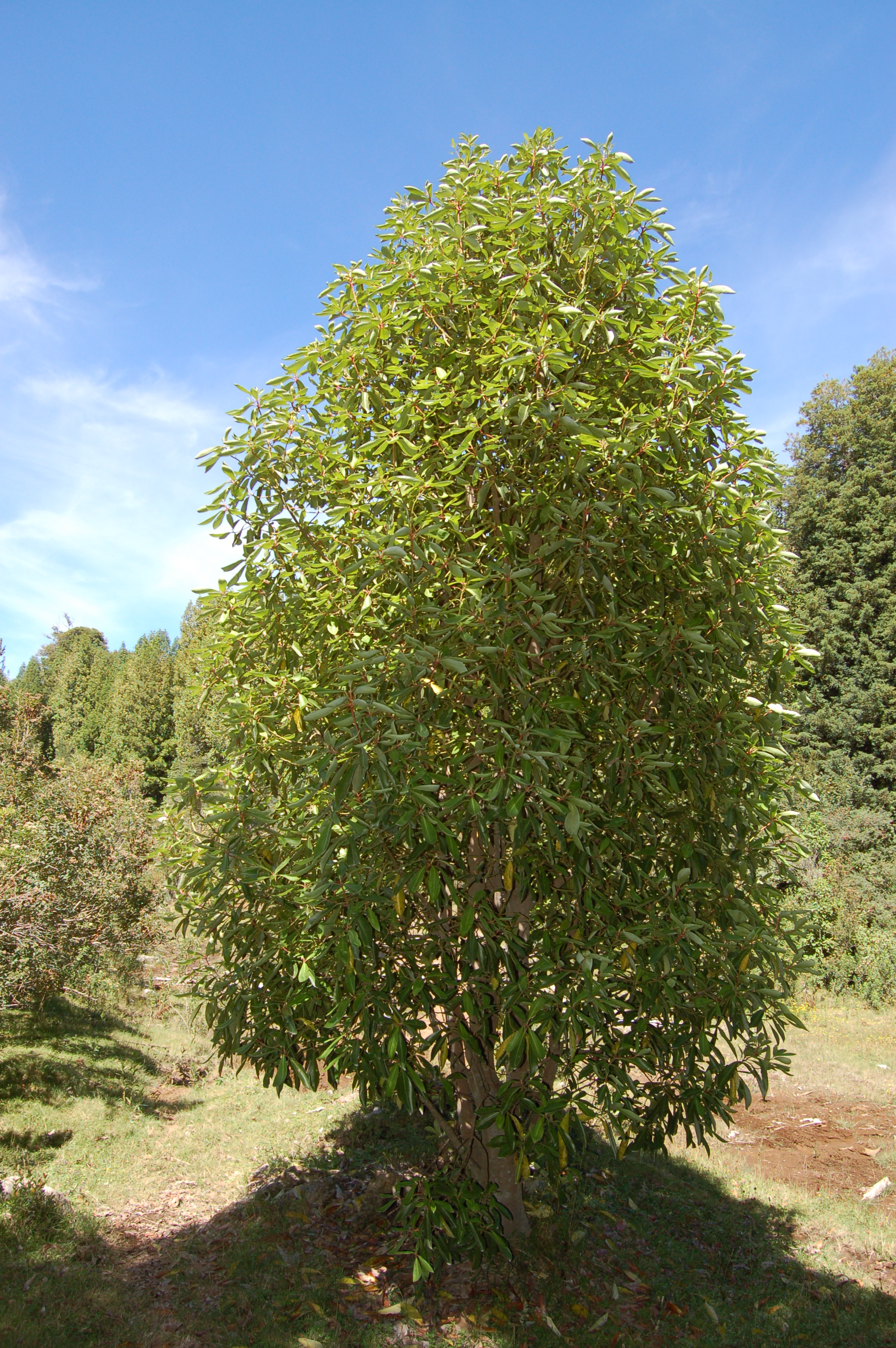
- Young adult

Conservation status
- Least Concern (IUCN 3.1)

Scientific classification
- Kingdom: Plantae
- Clade: Tracheophytes
- Clade: Angiosperms
- Clade: Magnoliids
- Order: Canellales
- Family: Winteraceae
- Genus: Drimys
- Species: D. winteri

Binomial name
- Drimys winteri J.R. Forst. & G. Forst.

Synonyms
- Wintera aromatica Murray

= Drimys winteri =

Species of tree from South America

Drimys winteri, also known as Winter's bark, foye and canelo, is a slender species of tree in the family Winteraceae, growing up to 20 m (66 ft) tall. It is native to the Magellanic and Valdivian temperate forests of Chile and Argentina, where it is a dominant tree in the coastal evergreen forests. It is found below 1,200 m (3,900 ft) between latitude 32° south and Cape Horn at latitude 56°. In its southernmost natural range it can tolerate temperatures down to −20 °C (−4 °F). The plant is renowned for its phenotypic plasticity being able to grow in different sites from "extreme arid zones to wetlands along Chile". The tree does also grow in places with various types and degrees of competition from other plants.

== Description ==
The leaves are lanceolate, glossy green above, whitish below and can measure up to 20 cm (8 in). The flowers are white with a yellow center, and consist of a great number of petals and stamens. The fruit is a bluish berry.

The height–diameter relation of D. winteri varies greatly. There is for example more spread in D. winteri height–diameter relations than for Nothofagus species. Part of the spread can be explained as reflecting higher tree density that correlates with larger heights for a given diameter. Within its range D. winteri is more frost-tolerant than naturally occurring conifers and vessel-bearing angiosperms such as the Nothofagus. This challenged conventional views that plants without vessels such as D. winteri would be biological relicts poorly adapted to cold.

== History ==
The canelo or foye is the sacred tree of the Mapuche, who associated it with "good, peace and justice", often planted in special gatherings. Priests of their native religion were named foyeweye or boquibuye, "servant of the foye".

When Sir Francis Drake sailed round the world in 1577-80, of the four ships accompanying the Golden Hind at the outset, the only ship that successfully reached the entrance to the Strait of Magellan was the Elizabeth, captained by John Wynter. Before entering the Strait, in July 1578, Drake sent Wynter ashore where he learned indigenous people ate the astringent bark. The Elizabeth transversed the Strait. A week later the two ships were separated in a storm and Wynter turned back. Wynter returned in 1580 with a supply of Drimys bark, and for centuries before vitamin C was isolated, "Winter's Bark" was esteemed as a preventive and remedy for scurvy— correctly so, for an infusion of D. winteri sustained Captain James Cook and his crew in the South Pacific, and the naturalist accompanying his voyage of exploration, Johann Reinhold Forster, was the first to officially describe and name D. winteri.

== Cultivation ==
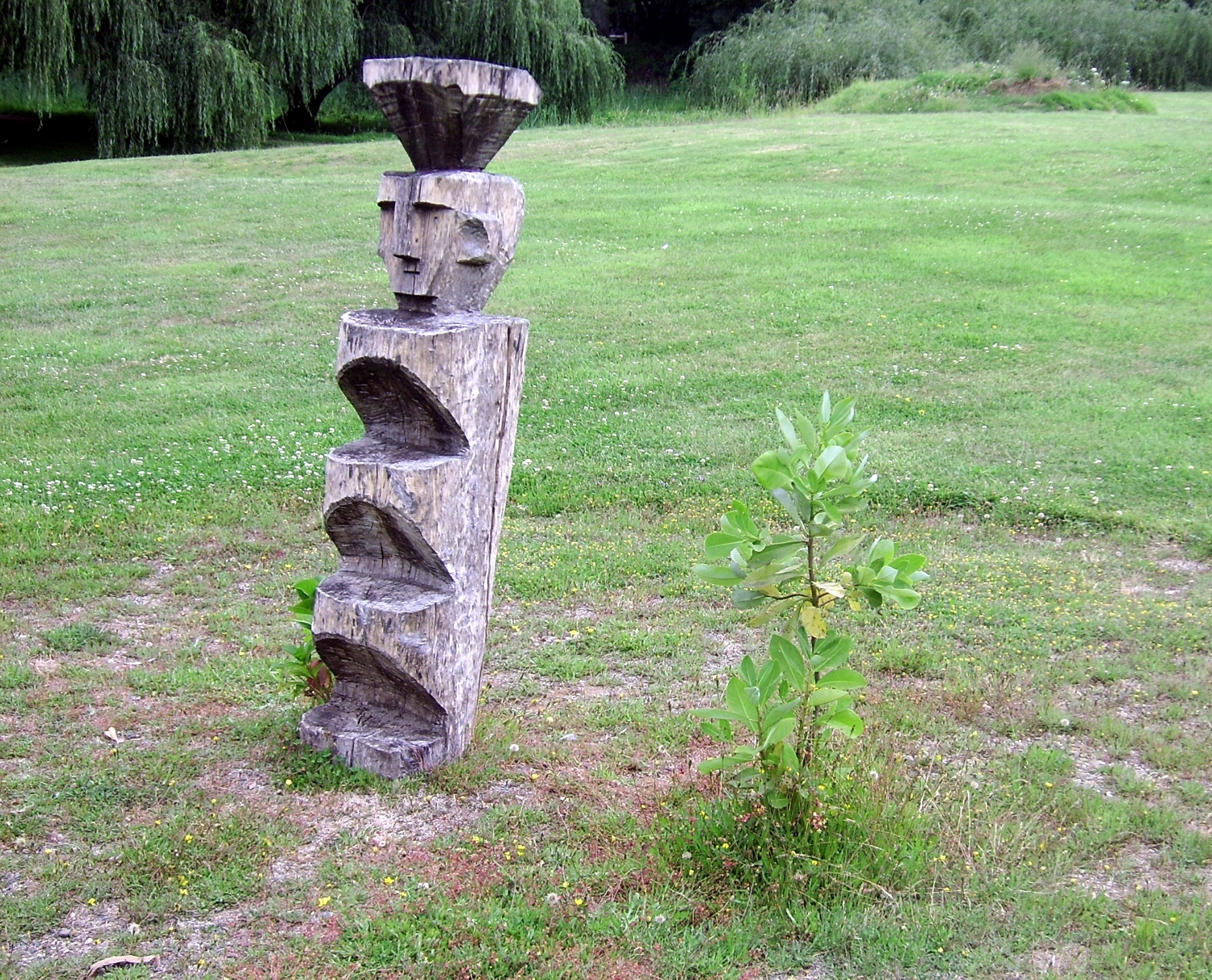
A rewe and canelo tree in the Austral University of Chile.

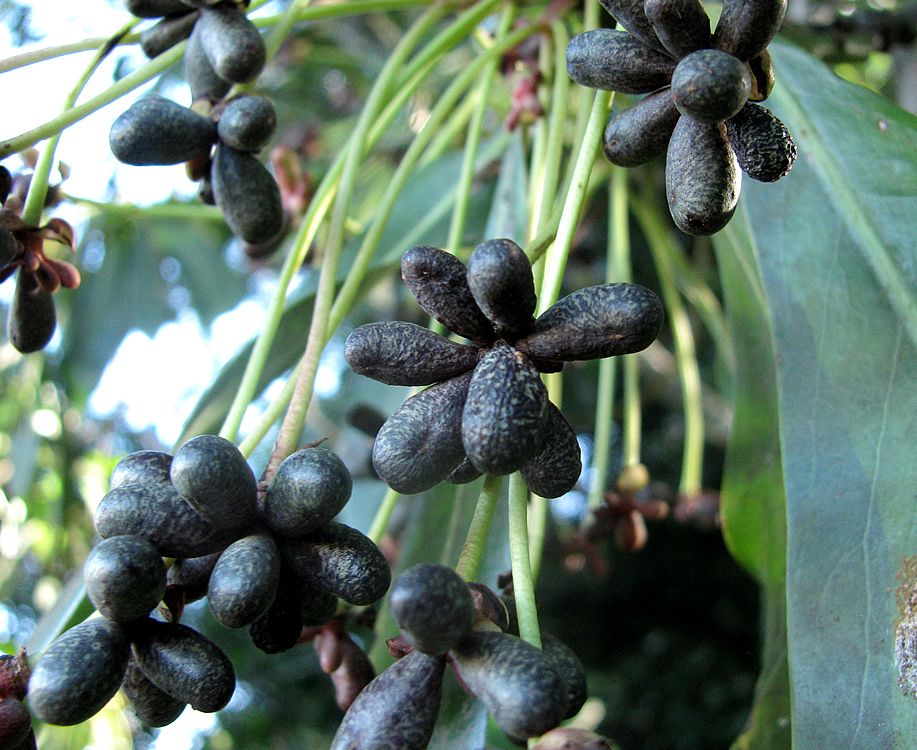
fruits

Drimys winteri is grown in cool moist climates as an ornamental plant for its red-brown bark, bright green fragrant leaves and its clusters of creamy white jasmine-scented flowers.

The species grows well in southern Great Britain, flourishing as far north as Anglesey. Specimens brought from the southern forests of Tierra del Fuego and planted in the Faroe Islands have proven to be especially hardy.

This plant has gained the Royal Horticultural Society's Award of Garden Merit.

It has been planted in the North Pacific Coast of the United States.

The species is considered to have a potential for flood mitigation in northern Chile if planted in valleys.

== Other uses ==
Canelo wood is reddish in color and heavy, with a very beautiful grain. It is used for furniture and musical instruments. The wood is not durable outdoors because continuous rainfalls damage it. The wood is not good for making bonfires because it gives off a spicy smoke.

The bark is gray, thick and soft and is used as a pepper replacement in Argentina and Chile. The peppery compound in canelo is polygodial.

D. winteri is an insect repellent and fumigant. Zapata & Smagghe 2010 tested the essential oils of bark and leaves and find that both are repellent and usable as a fumigant against Tribolium castaneum.
