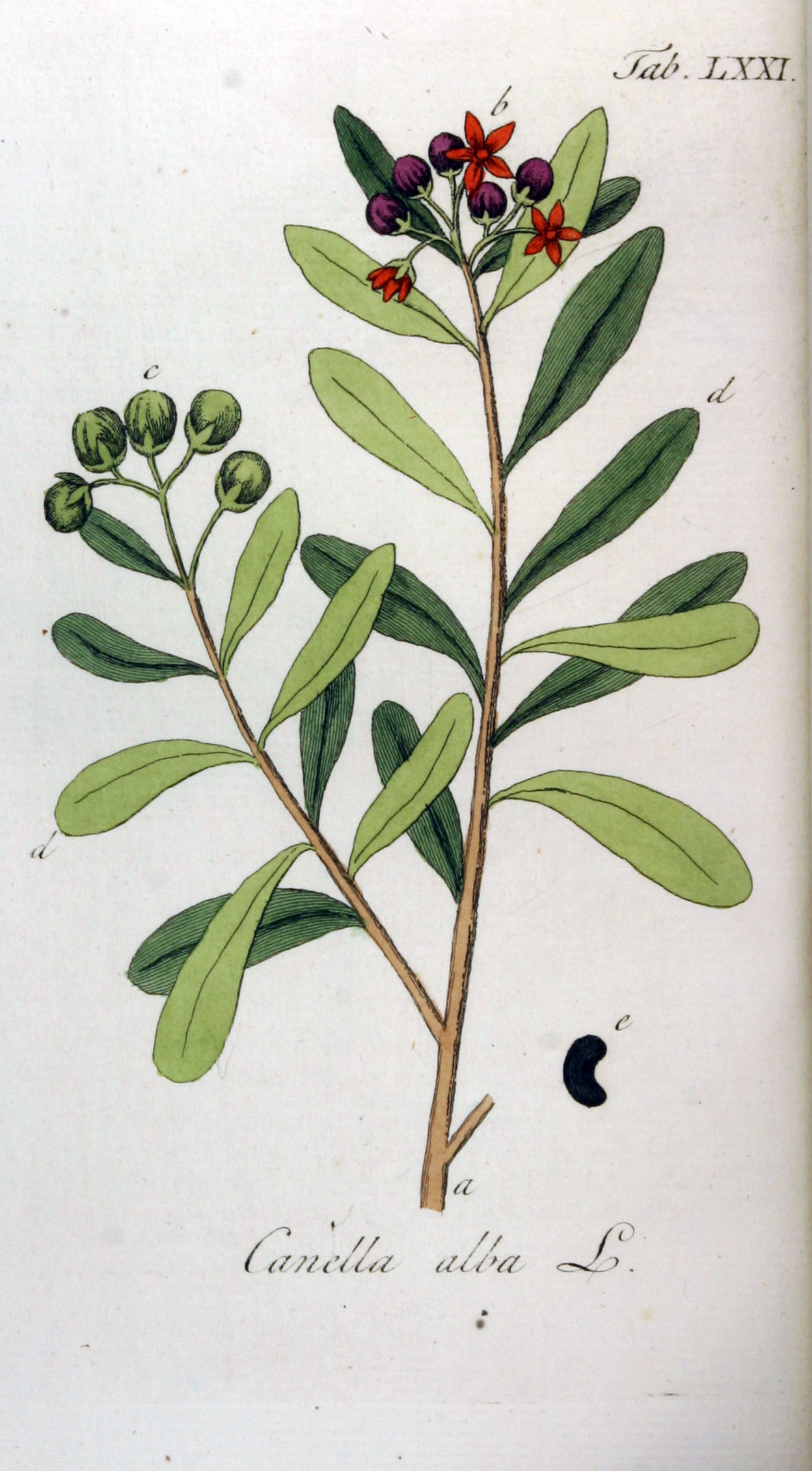
- Canella winterana

Scientific classification
- Kingdom: Plantae
- Clade: Embryophytes
- Clade: Tracheophytes
- Clade: Angiosperms
- Clade: Magnoliids
- Order: Canellales
- Family: Canellaceae; Mart.

Genera
- Canella; Cinnamodendron; Cinnamosma; Pleodendron; Warburgia

= Canellaceae =

Family of flowering plants

The Canellaceae are a family of flowering plants in the order Canellales. The order includes only one other family, the Winteraceae. Canellaceae is native to the Afrotropical and Neotropical realms. They are small to medium trees, rarely shrubs, evergreen and aromatic. The flowers and fruit are often red.

Several species of Canellaceae are important in herbal medicine or as a substitute for cinnamon, which is obtained from genus Cinnamomum in family Lauraceae. Canella winterana is the only species known in cultivation.

The family is divided into five genera, but studies of DNA sequences have indicated one of these genera should be split. These genera together comprise about 25 species. In the Greater Antilles, many of these species are rare and restricted to small ranges. As of 2008, five of the species were newly recognized and not yet named.

== Description ==
Some common properties include:

- These trees, rarely shrubs, are evergreen and glabrous.
- The stems have nodes with three (rarely two) leaf gaps and three leaf traces. The xylem has narrow rays. The bark is aromatic, with prominent and unusual appearing lenticels.
- The leaves have a peppery taste, are alternate, spiral, or distichous in arrangement, simple, entire, coriaceous, petiolate, pinnately nerved, without stipules, with translucent (pellucid) glands. The parenchyma is without palisade layer in Pleodendron and Canella. The stomata are paracytic in American genera, and anomocytic in the Old World.
- The inflorescences are terminal or axillary, in a panicle (Canella) or a raceme; otherwise, the flowers are solitary (by reduction) and axillary.
- The flowers are actinomorphic, hypogynous, and usually trimerous. The receptacles are barely excavated, and the hypogynous disc is absent.
- The three (rarely 2) sepals are thick, coriaceous, and imbricate.
- The petals number (4-)5-12, in 1-2 (-4) unlike whorls or spirally arranged, slender, imbricate in bud, usually free (connate at the base in Canella and halfway to the apex in Cinnamosma).
- The androecium is monadelphous, adnate to the ovary. Stamens number 6-12, apparently derived from the fusion of two whorls in Warburgia and Canella. Anthers are extrorse and bithecal, with two sporangia per theca, attached to the outside of the staminal tube, and sessile; dehiscence is by a longitudinal slit, connective not projecting beyond thecae or only slightly so.
- The gynoecium is syncarpous. The ovary has two to six carpels, unilocular and superior. The style is short and thick; the stigma is apical and capitate, with two to six lobes. Placentation is parietal. Ovules number from two to many in one or two rows on each of the two to six placentas; they are hemianatropous to campylotropous, bitegmic, and crassinucellate.
- The fruit is a berry with a persistent calyx, with two or more seeds. Cinnamosma macrocarpa, in the Madagascan genus Cinnamosma, has the largest fruit in the family, sometimes reaching 6 cm (2.4 in) by 9 cm (3.5 in).
- Seeds have exotestae (the outer layer of the testa) only; the tegmen (the inner layer of the testa) is collapsed. The seed coat has oily idioblasts; the endosperm is abundant and oily (ruminate in Cinnamosma). The embryo is small and straight to slightly curved, with two cotyledons.
- Pollen occurs in monads, and is delicate and monosulcate (usually with 10% of the grain trichotomosulcate); apertures are distal, exine, generally tectate, and granular, intectate, and reticulate in Cinnamosma; grains are small and hardly ornamented in Cinnamodendron and Warburgia, largest and most highly decorated in Canella and Pleodendron. The pollen is generally similar to that of the Myristicaceae, which had at one time caused some systematists to believe the two families were closely related.
- The chromosome number 2n is 22, 26, or 28.

Synapomorphies for Canellaceae include monadelphous stamens, parietal placentation, and campylotropous ovules.

Other notable traits include the conspicuous lenticels, the aromatic bark, the peppery taste of the leaves, the three (rarely two) fleshy sepals, and the berry with reniform seeds.

Some sources indicate Cinnamodendron has 20-40 stamens, contrary to the sources that are regarded here as reliable. The very large stamen numbers (20 to 40), are probably counts of thecae or microsporangia.

== Ecology ==
Canellaceae has species in both xeric and wet forests.

In Canella winterana, the flowers are protogynous. The berries are usually red, and probably eaten by birds, which contribute to seed dispersal (ornithochory). The trees are attacked by larvae of different insects, including dipterans.

== Phytochemistry ==
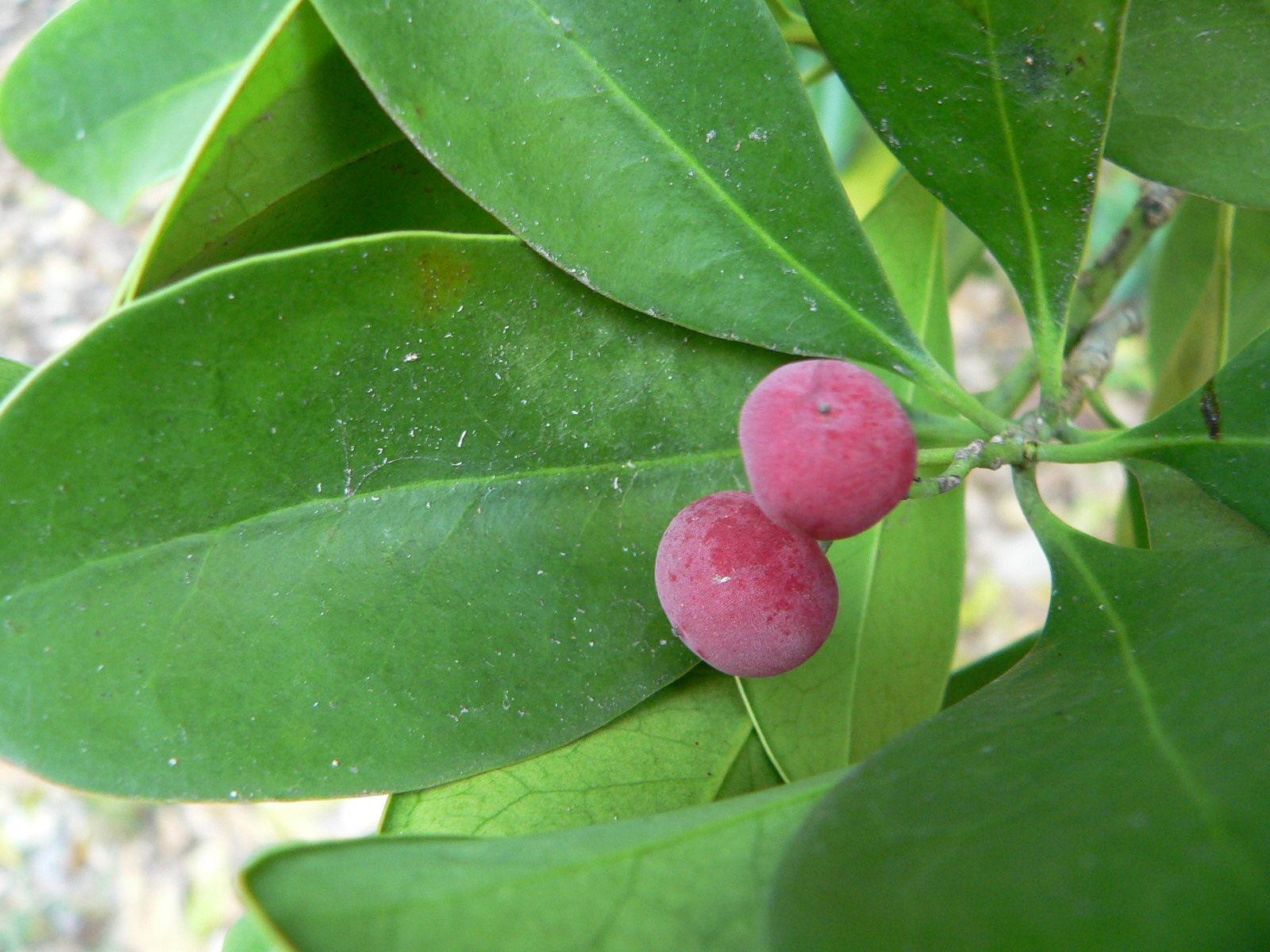
Fruit of Canella winterana, at Pointe des Châteaux, Guadeloupe, October 2008

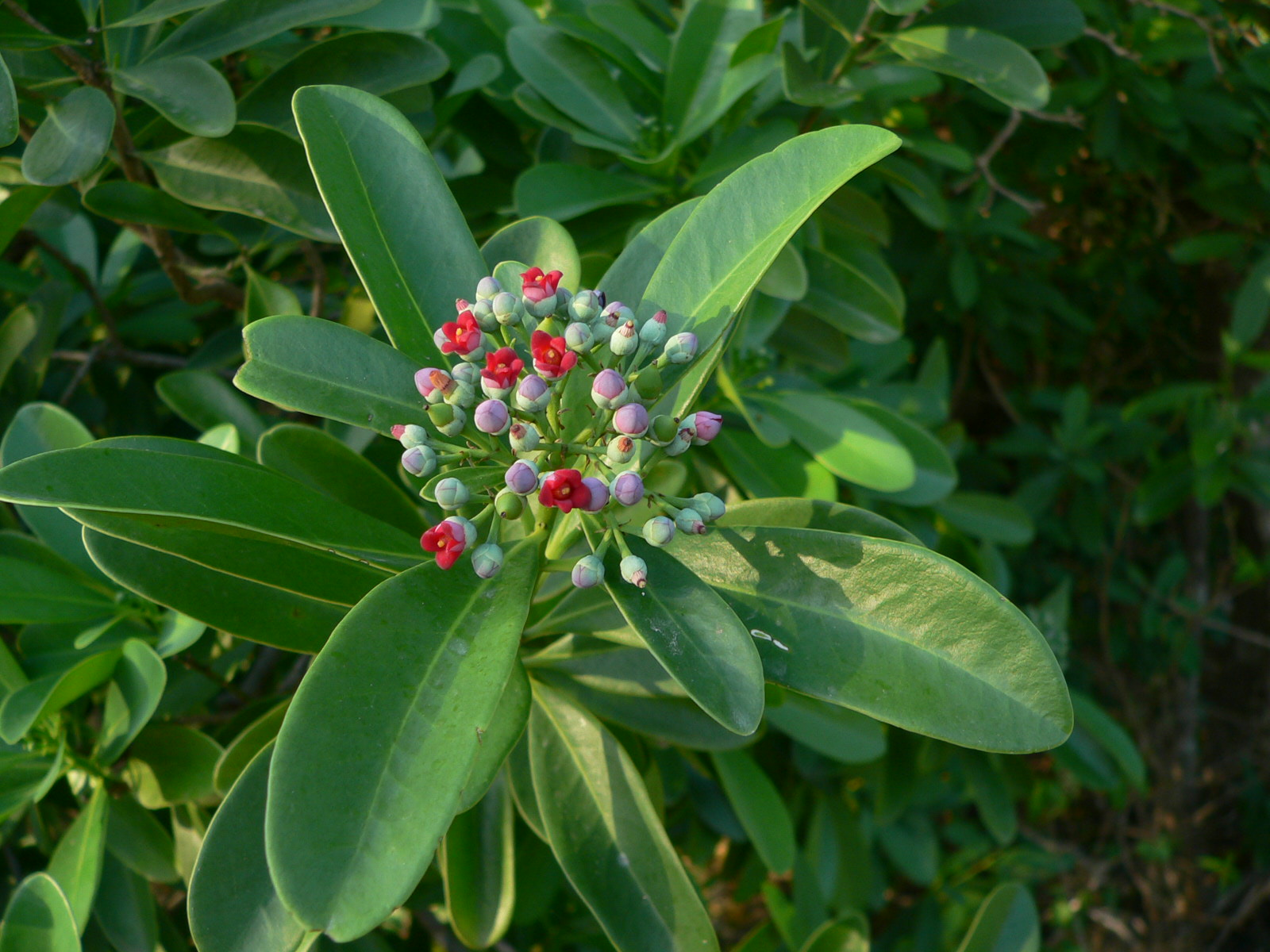
Flowers of C. winterana, at Pointe des Châteaux, Guadeloupe, October 2008

Monoterpenes are common, as are drimane-type sesquiterpenes, including cinnafragrins, cinnamodial, and capsicodendrin. These three sesquiterpenes are shared with only the Winteraceae in angiosperms. Canellaceae also have alkaloids of the aporphine type, such as N-(cinnamoyl)-tryptamine, lignans of the aryl-tetralin type, cinnamaldehydes, and allylphenols. Crystals of calcium oxalate are in the leaf mesophyll. Most species are cyanogenetic. Protocyanidins, flavonols, saponins, sapogenins, and ellagic acid are absent.

== Uses ==
The saro, or green sandalwood, (also known locally as mandravasarotra), Cinnamosma fragrans, is native to Madagascar and is exported from there to India to be burned in ceremonies. It is not related to the true sandalwoods, which are in the family Santalaceae.

Most species of Canellaceae produce bark that is similar in odor and flavor to cinnamon, but they are closely related to the family Piperaceae including black pepper (Piper nigrum) than to true cinnamons, which are in the family Lauraceae (still within Magnoliids).

The white cinnamon, Canella winterana, a native of Florida and the Antilles, is used as a condiment, with tonic properties.

Commercial production of "white cinnamon" from C. winterana has ceased, but small-scale, local production continues. The Canellaceae have long had local use as aromatic plants and as herbal medicines.

The bark of the red cinnamon or false Winter's bark, Cinnamodendron corticosum, is used as a substitute for Winter's bark (Drimys winteri, a member of Winteraceae) in Chile and Argentina, where it is called canelo, a name that is also applied to cinnamon. In Africa, several species of Warburgia have medicinal uses. The barks of Warburgia salutaris and Warburgia ugandensis are used to treat fevers, colds, and malaria. Other species are used for timber or in the production of resins used as glue.

== Fossils ==
Fossil leaves of Canella are known from the Pliocene of Bahia (Brazil). Pollen of Pleodendron is known from the Oligocene of Puerto Rico.

== Systematic position ==
Depending on the classification system and the characters considered, Canellaceae has been placed close to Annonaceae, Myristicaceae or Winteraceae. In his last book, Armen Takhtajan defined the order Canellales as consisting of Canellaceae and Winteraceae. This circumscription is followed in the APG IV system, in which the order Canellales is sister to another small order, the Piperales. These two orders combined with another two sister-orders Laurales and Magnoliales form together the clade Magnoliids.

== Included taxa ==
Theoretical introduction to Taxonomy

In this article, the genus Capsicodendron is maintained in synonymy with Cinnamodendron, although preliminary molecular phylogenetic studies separate Capsicodendron from Cinnamodendron and place Capsicodendron closer to Cinnamosma and Warburgia than to Cinnamodendron. This placement is not corroborated by morphology. The currently recognized genera in Canellaeae can be distinguished as follows:

- Canellaceae
  - Cinnamosma
  - - Canella
    - - Pleodendron
      - - Cinnamodendron
        - Warburgia

- Petals fused into a tube to the middle of their length

Cinnamosma Baill., 1867, Madagascar

- Petals free or slightly connate at the base

* Petals 5, slightly connate at the base, inflorescence a terminal panicle

Canella P. Browne, 1757, Florida, Antilles, northern South America

* Petals 6-12, free, flowers solitary, terminal or axillary, or in axillary inflorescences

* Petals 12, in 3-4 whorls, stamens 12, carpels 6

Pleodendron Tiegh., 1899, Greater Antilles, Costa Rica

* Petals 6-10, in two whorls, stamens 6-10, carpels 2-5(-6)

* Petals 6-10, stamens 6-10, carpels 2-4(-6), leaves elliptic to obovate, ripe fruit up to 2 cm in length

Cinnamodendron Endl., 1840 (including Capsicodendron Hoehne, 1933), Greater Antilles to southern Brazil

* Petals 10, stamens 10, carpels 5, leaves oblanceolate-spatulate to elongate, ripe fruit 3-6 cm long

Warburgia Engl., 1895, eastern and southern Africa

== History ==
Canella winterana was an important medicinal plant of the natives of the American tropics, and it was soon adopted as such by the Europeans, as well. Dr. Diego Álvarez Chanca accompanied Christopher Columbus on his second voyage, after which he wrote of a cinnamon (canela in Spanish) which was unlike any of the species of cinnamon used in Europe. He had probably reported the use of C. winterana.

In 1737, in his Hortus Cliffortianus, Linnaeus combined Canella with Drimys, a genus now in Winteraceae, and Cinnamomum, now in Lauraceae, to form a taxon which he called Winterania. In 1753, in the first edition of Species Plantarum, Linnaeus divided Winterania into four species. Three of these are now in Cinnamomum, and the fourth, which he called Laurus winterana, consisted of what are now Canella winterana and Drimys winteri. These four species were included in a broadly defined Laurus.

In 1756, Patrick Browne applied the name Canella to the species now known as Canella winterana. He did not add a specific epithet to create a binomial. The generic name is derived from canela, the Spanish word for cinnamon, but the Spanish word is derived from the Latin canna, meaning "a reed", or from the related Greek kanna, which refers to a piece of rolled bark.

The genus Canella was not adopted by Linnaeus, who resurrected Winterania in the second edition of Species Plantarum in 1762. He assigned to Winterania a single species, Winterania canella, which was equivalent to the species he had previously called Laurus winterana.

In 1784, Johan Andreas Murray divided Winterania into two monospecific genera, the constituent species of which were Canella alba and Wintera aromatica. The name Canella alba was validated by Murray in 1784, but it had long been in use. Linnaeus attributed the name to Samuel Dale, who used it in his Pharmacologia, the first edition of which was published in 1693. Patrick Browne mentions its use by Mark Catesby. Canella alba was renamed as Canella winterana by Joseph Gaertner in 1788 in his classic work De Fructibus et Seminibus Plantarum (The Fruits and Seeds of Plants). The name change was required by the rules of botanical nomenclature. Wintera aromatica is now known as Drimys winteri and is in the family Winteraceae.

The family Canellaceae was established by Carl von Martius in 1832 and was defined as consisting of only the genus Canella. Stephan Endlicher divided Canella in 1840, creating the new genus Cinnamodendron. Cinnamosma was erected in 1867, Warburgia in 1895, and Pleodendron in 1899. Capsicodendron was erected in 1933. Some authors accept Capsicodendron and assign to it two species, Capsicodendron pimenteira and Capsicodendron dinisii. Other authors subsume Capsicodendron into Cinnamodendron and C. pimenteira into C. dinisii.

Molecular phylogenetic studies of DNA sequences have shown Cinnamodendron, as traditionally circumscribed, is polyphyletic, consisting of two distinct groups. These groups are morphologically different and their ranges do not overlap.

One of these groups is related to the African genera Cinnamosma and Warburgia, and might be paraphyletic over them. It consists of eight species, one of which was named in 2005. Two other species in this group have not been formally named and described in the scientific literature. This group is restricted to South America. Since it includes the type species, Cinnamodendron axillare, it will retain the name Cinnamodendron.

The other group of Cinnamodendron species is most closely related to Pleodendron and is restricted to the Greater Antilles. It consists of six species, two of which remain unnamed. The name Antillodendron has been proposed for this group, but this name is considered by some to be invalid because it was not effectively published.
