= 膾 =

膾 may refer to:

- Kuai (dish), a Chinese dish
- Namasu, a Japanese dish
- Hoe (dish), a Korean dish
