= Yusheng =

Cantonese-style raw fish salad

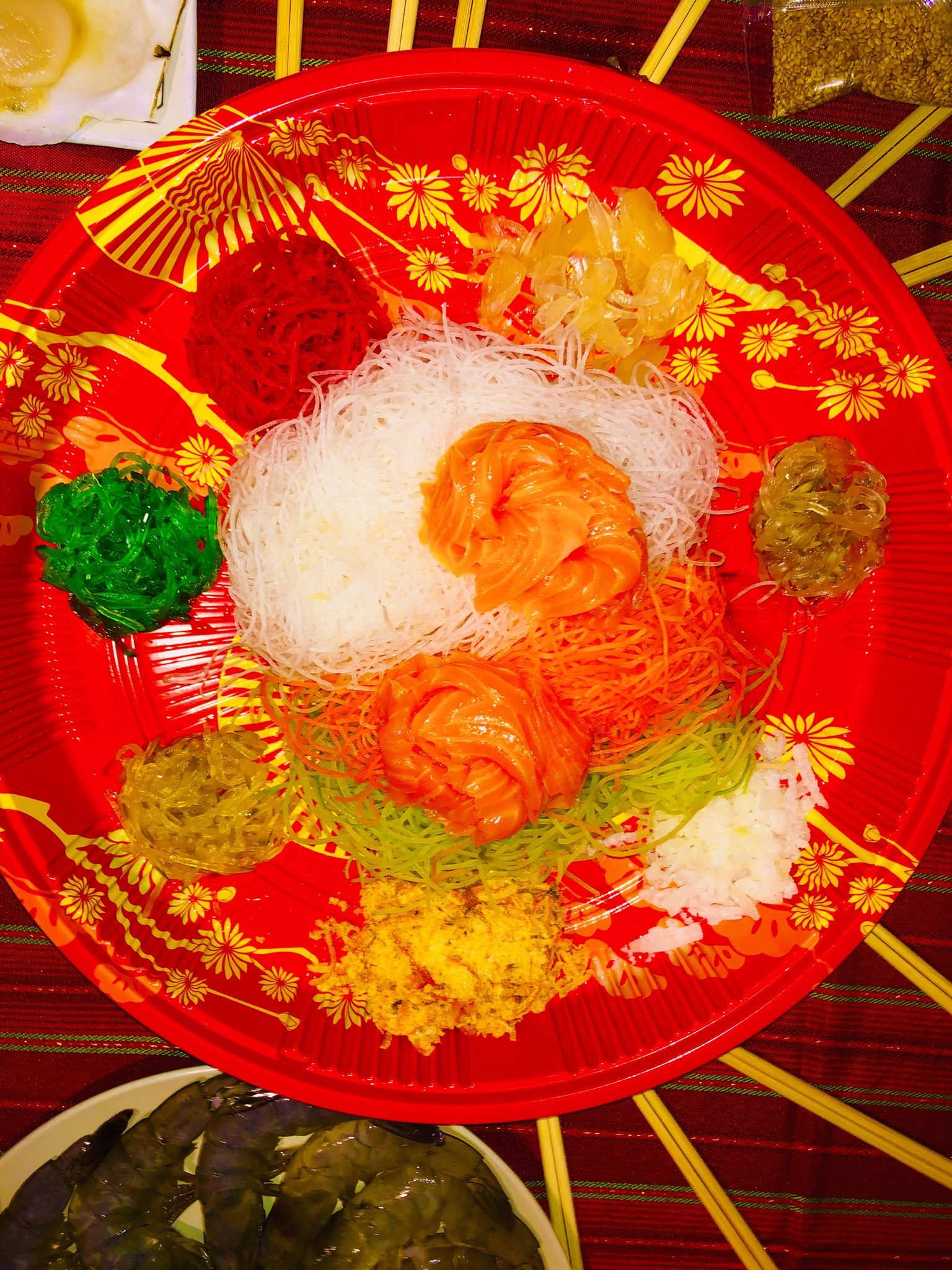
- Qicai yusheng prior to mixing
- Alternative names: Lou sang, yee sang, lo hei, Prosperity Toss
- Type: Salad
- Course: Traditionally consumed during Chinese New Year
- Region or state: East and Southeast Asia
- Associated cuisine: Malaysia and Singapore (historical origins); Brunei, Indonesia, Hong Kong and Thailand (recent trend)
- Main ingredients: Raw fish (or soy fish for the vegetarian version), shredded vegetables and a variety of sauces and condiments

Yusheng
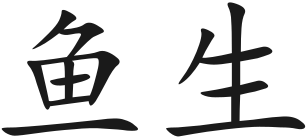
- Yusheng in Simplified Chinese (top) and Traditional Chinese character (below)
- Traditional Chinese: 魚生
- Literal meaning: "raw fish"
Transcriptions
Standard Mandarin
- Hanyu Pinyin: yúshēng
- Bopomofo: ㄩˊ ㄕㄥ
- Gwoyeu Romatzyh: yusheng
- Wade–Giles: yü^{2}-shêng^{1}
- Tongyong Pinyin: yúsheng
Hakka
- Pha̍k-fa-sṳ: ng-sâng
Yue: Cantonese
- Yale Romanization: yùh sāang
- Jyutping: jyu^{4} saang^{1}
Southern Min
- Hokkien POJ: hî-sang
- Tâi-lô: hî-sang
- Teochew Peng'im: he^{5} cên^{1}

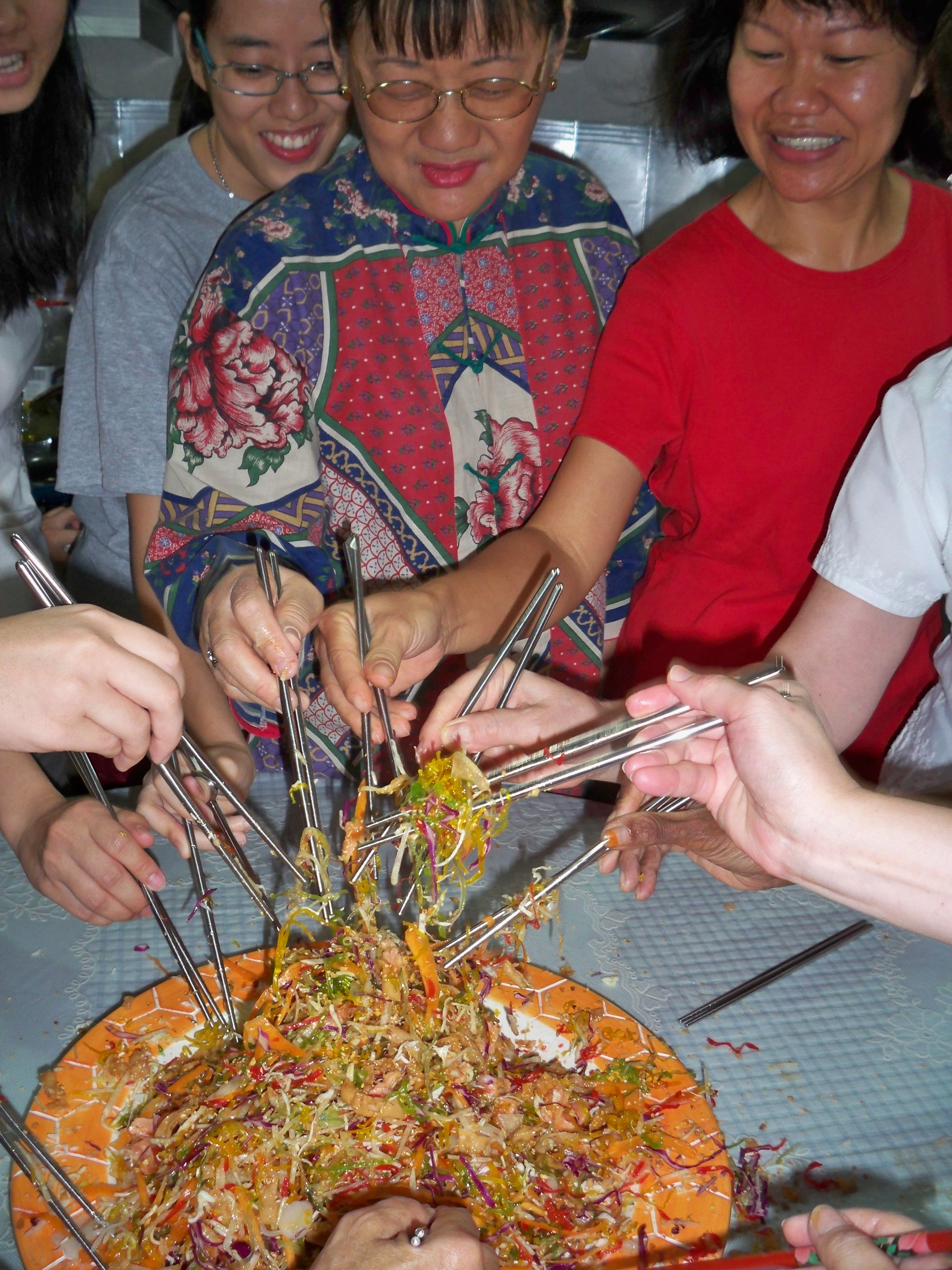
Ceremonial tossing of ingredients

Yusheng, yee sang or yuu sahng (Chinese: 魚生; pinyin: yúshēng; Jyutping: jyu4saang1), or Prosperity Toss, also known as lo sahng (Cantonese for 撈生) is a Chinese raw fish salad that is popular among the Chinese communities of Malaysia and Singapore. It has become a trend in the neighbouring countries, especially the Chinese diaspora in Indonesia, Brunei, Thailand and even Hong Kong. It usually consists of strips of raw fish (sometimes salmon), mixed with shredded vegetables and a variety of sauces and condiments, among other ingredients. There is also a vegetarian version of this dish, where the fish is replaced with soy "fish", which resembles salmon. Yusheng literally means "raw fish" but since "fish" (魚) is commonly conflated with its homophone "abundance" (余), Yúshēng (鱼生) is interpreted as a homophone for Yúshēng (余升), meaning an increase in abundance. Therefore, yusheng is considered a symbol of abundance, prosperity and vigor.

The dish is believed to have been derived in Southeast Asia by the Chinese communities (particularly the Cantonese) who moved from China to the modern-day states of Malaysia and Singapore. Modern takes of the dish existed in both Malaysia and Singapore with both countries having competitive claims over who first modified the dish to its modern version. Today, the common form of yusheng is the qicai yusheng (七彩鱼生; "rainbow raw fish salad") served in local restaurants during the Chinese New Year period. Also referred to as facai yusheng (发财鱼生; "prosperity raw fish salad") or xinnian yusheng (新年魚生; "Chinese New Year raw fish salad"). The recipe generally includes ingredients such as shredded radish (or daikon) and carrots, ginger slices, onion slices, crushed peanuts, pomelo, pepper, essence of chicken, oil, salt, vinegar, sugar and more.

Yusheng during Chinese New Year is a cultural activity for the Chinese population in Malaysia and Singapore and recently become popular although not historically practiced in Indonesia, Thailand and Hong Kong over the last few decades.

== Origins ==
The Chinese Cuisine Association mentions the tradition coming from Malaysia and Singapore before the dishes were brought to Southeast Asia by Chinese immigration. However, the statement only mentions the tradition of having raw fish during Chinese New Year, which was served very differently from today's Yusheng.

=== Dispute ===
The dish originated in Malaysia and Singapore but modern takes of the dish existed in both Malaysia and Singapore with both countries having competitive claims over who invented or modified the dish first. In 2020, a descendant of Lu Zhen Ji stated that the origin of the claim was hard to prove and meaningless to insist on an origin, ending the dispute.

==== Singapore ====
In Singapore, the claim was that the dish was modified by four chefs, Than Mui Kai (Tham Yu Kai, co-head chef of Lai Wah Restaurant), Lau Yoke Pui (co-head chef of Lai Wah Restaurant), Hooi Kok Wai (founder of Dragon-Phoenix Restaurant) and Sin Leong (founder of Sin Leong Restaurant), in a restaurant kitchen in Singapore.

In the 1970s, the Lai Wah Restaurant located at Bendemeer started the modern-day method of serving yusheng with a pre-mixed special sauce comprising plum sauce, rice vinegar, kumquat paste and sesame oil – instead of customers mixing inconsistently-concocted sauce.

In 2012, Chris Hooi, son of Hooi Kok Wai, one of the four chefs, clarified that the four chefs never claimed they invented the dish and their modified dish only took off in Singapore in the 1960s.

==== Malaysia ====
Malaysian historians and news media propose that the present yusheng originated from modifying an earlier fish noodle dish, served during Renri by Loke Ching Fatt (pinyin: Lù Zhēnfā; Jyutping: Luk6 Zing1 Faat3), who at the time owned Loke Ching Kee (Chinese: 陆祯记; pinyin: Lù Zhēn Jì; Jyutping: Luk6 Zing1 Kei3), a Chinese restaurant in the city of Seremban. One of Loke's grandchildren, statesman Anthony Loke launched a history book on the food's origins on their family side on 31 January 2020.

In 2009, the Malaysian Department of National Heritage claimed Yusheng, alongside other Malaysian food dishes, as an "Intangible Heritage Object of Malaysia".

== Ingredients and their symbolism ==
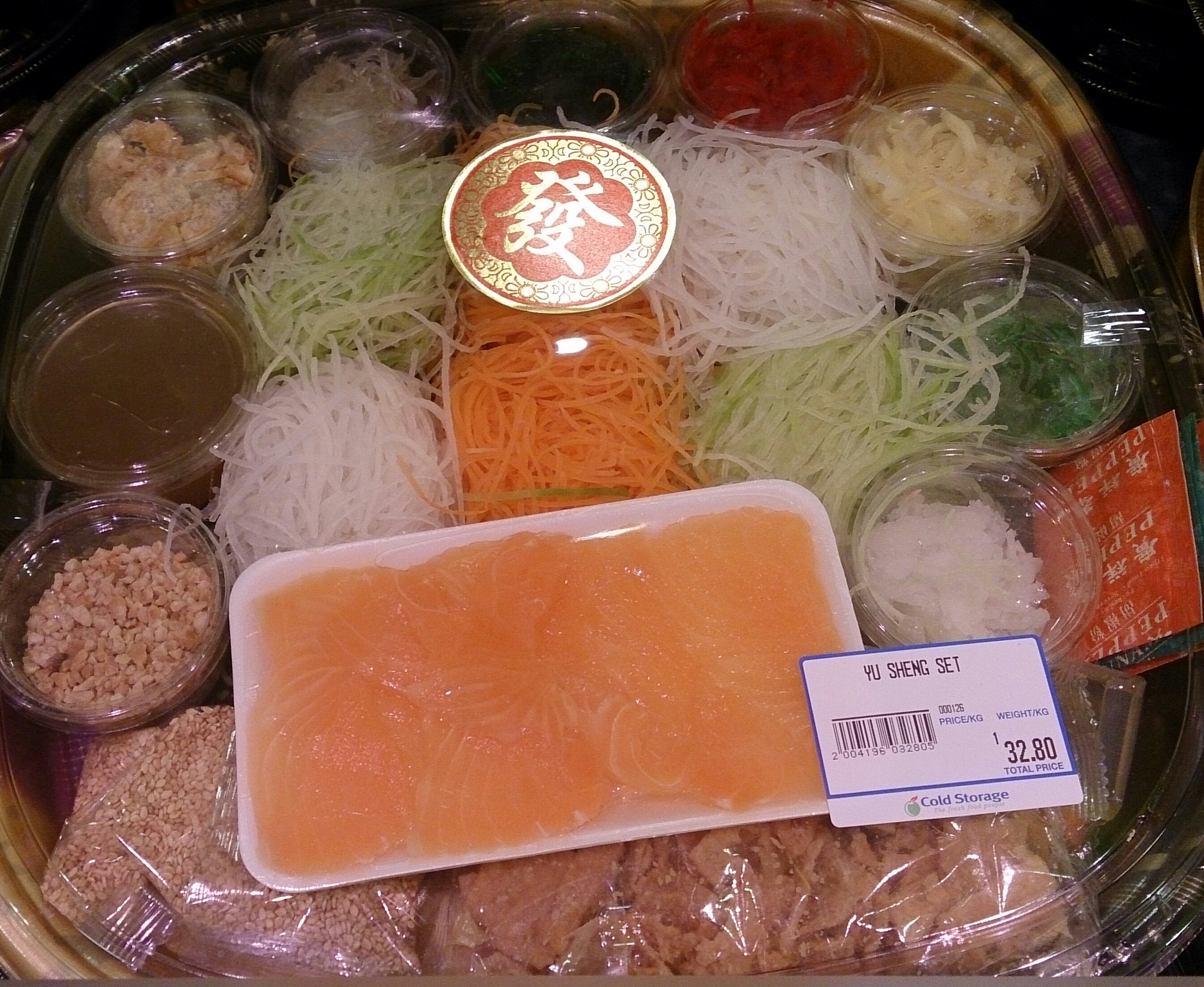
Yu sheng set at a supermarket in Singapore

When putting the yusheng on the table, New Year greetings are offered. Some of the phrases commonly used are:

- 恭喜发财 (pinyin: gōng xǐ fā cái; Jyutping: gung1 hei2 faat3 coi4) meaning "Congratulations and be wealthy"
- 万事如意 (pinyin: wàn shì rú yì; Jyutping: maan6 si6 jyu4 ji3) meaning "May all your wishes be fulfilled"

The fish is added – its Mandarin word, "鱼" (pronounced "yu") corresponds to a homophone of it "余" meaning "abundance", thus 年年有余 (pinyin: nian nian you yu; Jyutping: nin4 nin4 jau5 jyu4), "abundance through the year". Pomelo or lime (大利, da li / daai lei) is added to the fish, adding luck and auspicious value (大吉大利 pinyin: dà jí dà lì; Jyutping: daai6 gat1 daai6 lei6, meaning "good luck and smooth sailing"). Pepper is then dashed over in the hope of attracting more money and valuables. 招财进宝 (pinyin: zhao cai jin bao; Jyutping: ziu1 coi4 zeon3 bou2) meaning "Attract wealth and treasures". Then oil is poured out, circling the ingredients and encouraging money to flow in from all directions – referring to 一本万利 (pinyin: yī běn wàn lì; Jyutping: jat1 bun2 maan6 lei6), meaning "make 10,000 times of profit with your capital", and 财源广进 (pinyin: cai yuan guang jin; Jyutping: coi4 jyun4 gwong2 zeon3) meaning "numerous sources of wealth".

Carrots are added indicating blessings of good luck: the first word in the compound word representing the ingredient, "红萝卜" (pinyin: hóng luó bo; Jyutping: hung4 lo4 baak6 pong6), 红 (hong / hung) has a homophone in 鸿 referring to 鸿运当头 (pinyin: hong yun dang tou; Jyutping: hung4 wan6 dong1 tau4) meaning "good luck is approaching". Shredded green radish is later added symbolising eternal youth – 青春常驻 (pinyin: qing chun chang zhu; Jyutping: cing1 ceon1 soeng4 zyu3), "forever young". After which the shredded white radish is added – prosperity in business and promotion at work (风生水起 pinyin: feng sheng shui qi; Jyutping: fung1 saang1 seoi2 hei2 – "progress at a fast pace", 步步高升 (pinyin: bu bu gao sheng; Jyutping: bou6 bou6 gou1 sing1) – "reaching higher level with each step".

The condiments are finally added. First, peanut crumbs are dusted on the dish, symbolising a household filled with gold and silver (金银满屋 pinyin: jin yin man wu; Jyutping: gam1 ngan4 mun5 uk1, meaning "household filled with gold and silver"). Sesame seeds quickly follow symbolizing a flourishing business (生意兴隆 pinyin: sheng yi xing long; Jyutping: saang1 ji3 hing1 lung4, meaning "prosperity for the business") Yu Sheng sauce, usually made from plum sauce, is generously drizzled over everything – a reference to 甜甜蜜蜜 pinyin: tian tian mi mi; Jyutping: tim4 tim4 mat6 mat6, meaning "may life always be sweet" Deep-fried flour crisps in the shape of golden pillows is then added with wishes that literally the whole floor would be filled with gold (遍地黄金 pinyin: bian di huang jin; Jyutping: pin3 dei6 wong4 gam1, "floor full of gold").

=== Modern version of the dish ===
The yusheng had fish served with daikon (white radish), carrots, red pepper (capsicum), turnips, red pickled ginger, sun-dried oranges, key lime leaves, coriander, chilli, jellyfish, chopped peanuts, toasted sesame seeds, Chinese shrimp crackers (or fried dried shrimp), five spice powder and other ingredients, laced with a sauce using plum sauce, rice vinegar, kumquat paste and sesame oil, for a total of 27 ingredients. Originally, the dish used raw wolf herring, although salmon was later offered as an alternative due to said species' growing popularity with customers.

== Serving ==
Yusheng being prepared and tossed during the 2015 Chinese New Year season in Singapore.

Yusheng is often served as part of a multi-dish dinner, usually as the appetizer due to its symbolism of "good luck" for the new year. Some would consume it on Renri, the seventh day of the Chinese New Year, although in practice it may be eaten on any convenient day during the Chinese New Year period (the first to the 15th day of the first lunar month).

The base ingredients are first served. The leader amongst the diners or the restaurant server proceeds to add ingredients such as the fish, the crackers and the sauces while saying auspicious wishes as each ingredient is added, typically related to the specific ingredient being added. For example, phrases such as 年年有余 (pinyin: niánnián yǒuyú; Jyutping: nin4 nin4 jau5 jyu4; "may there be abundance year after year") are uttered as the fish is added.

All diners at the table then stand up and proceed to toss the shredded ingredients into the air with chopsticks while saying various "auspicious wishes" out loud, or simply "lo hei, lo hei" (撈起, pinyin: lāoqǐ, lāoqǐ meaning "scoop it up, scoop it up"). It is believed that the height of the toss reflects the height of the diners' growth in fortunes, thus diners are expected to toss enthusiastically.

== See also ==
- Ceviche
- Gujeolpan
- Hoe (dish)
- Kuai (dish)
- List of salads
- Namasu
- Sashimi
