= Salmon tartare =

Appetizer

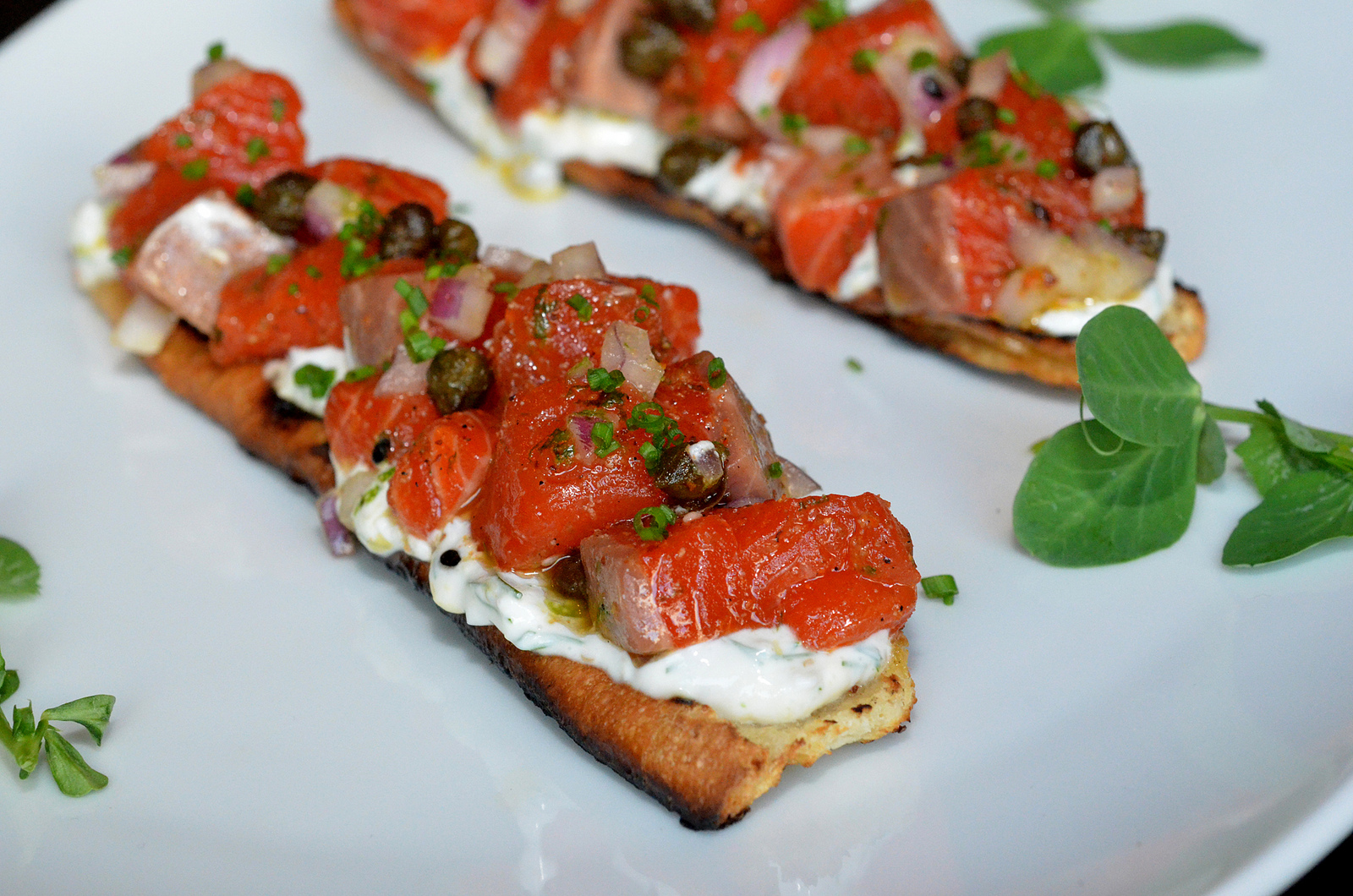
- Course: Hors d'oeuvre
- Main ingredients: Raw salmon, seasonings

Salmon tartare is prepared with fresh raw salmon and seasonings. It is commonly spread on a cracker or bread and eaten as an appetizer. For the usual preparation in Germany, the chopped salmon fillet is salted and peppered, mixed with finely diced shallots or onions, possibly chives or basil and seasoned with vinegar or lemon juice, oil and spices such as dill or coriander.

== See also ==
- List of hors d'oeuvre
- Sashimi
- Sushi
- Steak tartare
- Rui-be
