= Namasu =

Japanese dish of thinly sliced uncooked vegetables

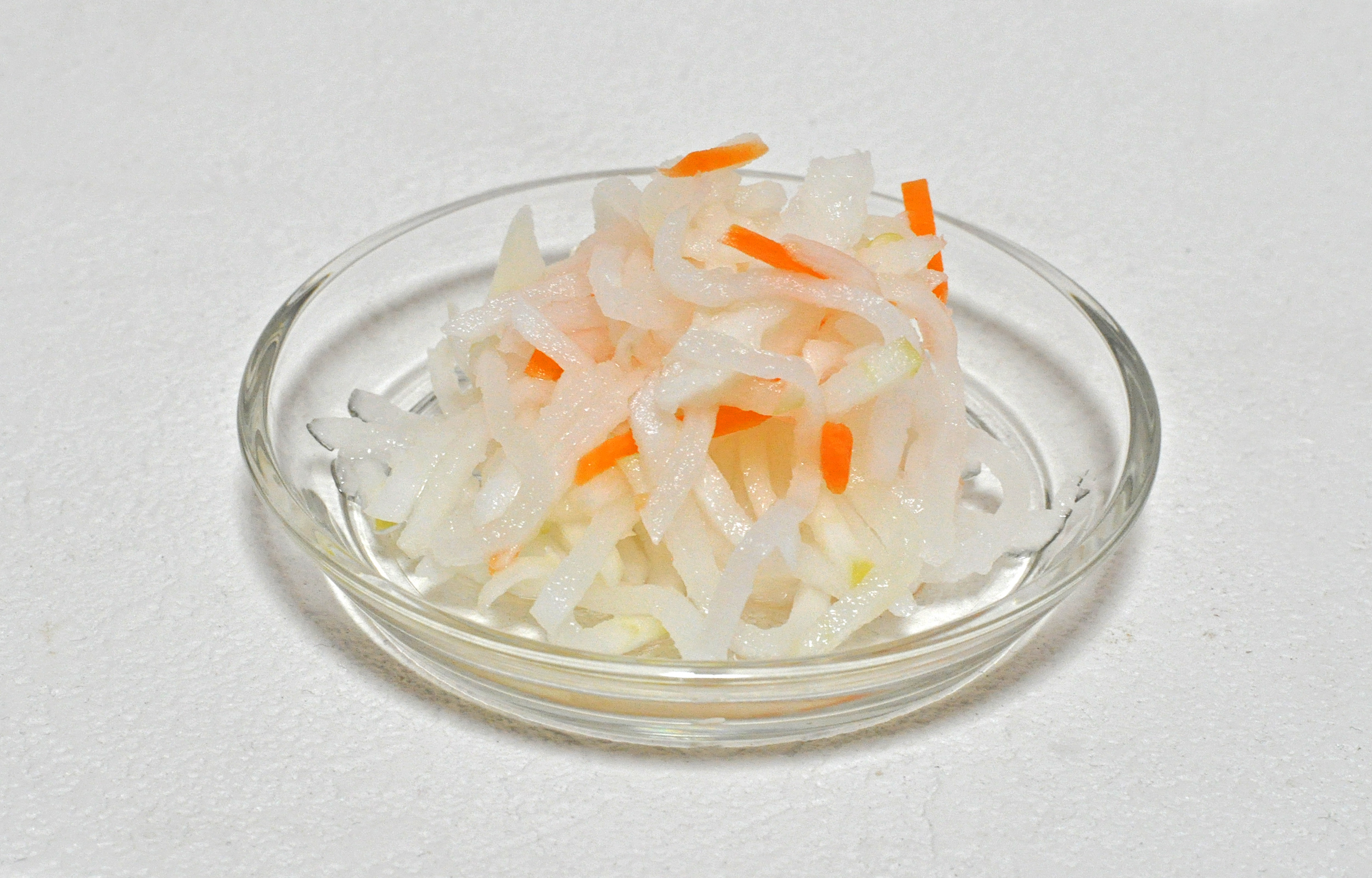
Kōhaku namasu Thin strips of pickled daikon radish and carrot

Namasu (膾) is a Japanese dish consisting of thinly sliced uncooked (nama) vegetables and seafood, marinated in rice vinegar (su) for several hours, pickling them slightly. Namasu was brought to Japan from China during the Nara period (710-794).

Namasu may also be called namasu-kiri (kiri means "sliced").

Sunomono and other vinegared salads are related to namasu. Sunomono dishes are closely related to namasu, which is a Japanese dish consisting of uncooked vegetables or seafood that has been thinly sliced and marinated in su, or vinegar. Marinating the foods in vinegar often leaves them with an acidic, pickled taste. Sunomono refers to food that has been dressed with vinegar, whereas namasu refers to food that has been marinated in vinegar.

== See also ==
- Ceviche
- Hoe
- Kuai
- Sashimi
- Yusheng
