= Polygodial =

Names
- IUPAC name Drim-7-ene-11,12-dial
- Systematic IUPAC name (1R,4aS,8aS)-5,5,8a-Trimethyl-1,4,4a,5,6,7,8,8a-octahydronaphthalene-1,2-dicarbaldehyde
- Other names: Poligodial; Tadeodal; Tadeonal

Identifiers
CAS Number	6754-20-7
3D model (JSmol)	Interactive image
ChEMBL	ChEMBL254550
ChemSpider	65414
PubChem CID	72503
UNII	5FAF7T66M7
CompTox Dashboard (EPA)	DTXSID901027214
- InChI: InChI=1S/C15H22O2/c1-14(2)7-4-8-15(3)12(10-17)11(9-16)5-6-13(14)15/h5,9-10,12-13H,4,6-8H2,1-3H3/t12-,13-,15+/m0/s1 Key: AZJUJOFIHHNCSV-KCQAQPDRSA-N; InChI=1/C15H22O2/c1-14(2)7-4-8-15(3)12(10-17)11(9-16)5-6-13(14)15/h5,9-10,12-13H,4,6-8H2,1-3H3/t12-,13-,15+/m0/s1 Key: AZJUJOFIHHNCSV-KCQAQPDRBV
- SMILES: CC1(CCC[C@]2([C@H]1CC=C([C@@H]2C=O)C=O)C)C

Properties
Chemical formula	C_{15}H_{22}O_{2}
Molar mass	234.339 g·mol^{−1}
- Except where otherwise noted, data are given for materials in their standard state (at 25 °C [77 °F], 100 kPa). verify (what is ?) Infobox references

Polygodial a is chemical compound found in dorrigo pepper, mountain pepper, horopito, canelo, paracress, water-pepper, and Dendrodoris limbata. It is a drimane-type sesquiterpene dialdehyde with the chemical formula C_{15}H_{22}O_{2}.

Polygodial elicits a warm and pungent flavour. The compound activates the TRPA1 pain receptor in nerve endings in the mouth that mediate the sensation of pungency.

== Biological activity ==
The in vitro biological activity of polygodial has been reported in the scientific literature to include antifungal and antimicrobial activities, antihyperalgesia, potent attachment-inhibitory activity, insect antifeedant activity, antinociception, vasorelaxing action in vessels of rabbit and guinea pig, anti-inflammatory and antiallergic activities.

Polygodial's primary antifungal action is as a nonionic surfactant, disrupting the lipid-protein interface of integral proteins nonspecifically, denaturing their functional conformation. It is also likely that polygodial permeates by passive diffusion across the plasma membrane, and once inside the cells may react with a variety of intracellular compounds.

It is also an insecticide with antifeedant properties, which causes insects to starve.

Polygodial is produced for chemical defense by Doridoidea (dorid nudibranchs), a superfamily of shell-less sea slugs. Polygodial was found to activate chemotactile receptors in the tentacles of cephalopods (octopus, squid) that prey on sea slugs, triggering avoidance behavior.
