= Renri =

7th day of the traditional Chinese calendar

- Also called: People's Day
- Observed by: Chinese people
- Type: Cultural, religious (Chinese folk religion)
- Date: Seventh day of the first Chinese lunisolar month
- 2025 date: 4 February
- 2026 date: 23 February
- 2027 date: 12 February
- Frequency: Annual
- Related to: Chinese New Year, Jinjitsu

Renri
- Chinese: 人日
- Literal meaning: People's Day; Humans' Day
Transcriptions
Standard Mandarin
- Hanyu Pinyin: Rénrì
- Wade–Giles: Jen jih
Yue: Cantonese
- Yale Romanization: Yàhnyat
- Jyutping: Jan4 jat6

Renri (Chinese: 人日; pinyin: Rénrì; Cantonese Yale: Yàhnyaht) is the 7th day of Zhengyue, the first month in the traditional Chinese calendar. According to Chinese customs, Renri was the day human beings were created. It is celebrated not only in China, but also in the surrounding region influenced by Chinese culture.

== Origin ==
In Chinese mythology, Nüwa was the goddess who created the world. She created the animals on different days, and human beings on the seventh day after the creation of the world. Questions and Answers on Rites and Customs (答問禮俗說) by Dong Xun (董勛) of the Jin dynasty and the Book of Divination (占書), an earlier of publication by Dongfang Shuo in the Western Han dynasty, both specify the order of creation:

First of Zhengyue: Chickens
Second of Zhengyue: Dogs
Third of Zhengyue: Pigs
Fourth of Zhengyue: Sheep
Fifth of Zhengyue: Cows
Sixth of Zhengyue: Horses
Seventh of Zhengyue: Humans

Hence, Chinese tradition has set the first day of Zhengyue as the "birthday" of the chicken, the second day of Zhengyue as the "birthday" of the dog, etc. And the seventh day of Zhengyue is viewed as the common "birthday" of all human beings.

== Celebration ==
=== Chinese ===
According to legend, the custom dates back to the Han dynasty, and gained importance after the Three Kingdoms period and Jin dynasty. Ancient Chinese had a tradition of wearing head ornaments called rensheng (人勝), which were made of ribbon or gold and represented humans. People also climbed mountains and composed poems. Emperors after the Tang dynasty granted ribbon rensheng to their subjects and held festivities with them. If there were good weather on Renri, it was considered that people will have a year of peace and prosperity.

Fireworks and huapao (花炮) are lit, so Renri celebrates the "birthday" of fire as well.

Since the first days of Zhengyue are considered "birthdays" of different animals, Chinese people avoid killing the animals on their respective birthdays and punishing prisoners on Renri.

Nowadays during Zhengyue, Renri is celebrated as part of the Chinese New Year. Chinese people prepare lucky food in the new year, where the "seven vegetable soup" (七菜羹), "seven vegetable congee" (七菜粥) and "jidi congee" (及第粥) are specially prepared for Renri. Malaysian and Singaporean Chinese use the "seven-coloured raw fish" (七彩魚生) instead of the "seven vegetable soup".

=== Japanese ===
In Japan, Renri is called Jinjitsu (人日, jinjitsu). It is one of the five seasonal festivals (五節句, gosekku). It is celebrated on January 7. It is also known as Nanakusa no sekku (七草の節句, nanakusa no sekku), "the feast of seven herbs", from the custom of eating seven-herb kayu (七草粥, nanakusa-gayu) to ensure good health for the coming year.

The celebration of the feast in Japan was moved from the seventh day of the first lunar month to the seventh day of January during the Meiji period, when Japan adopted the Gregorian calendar.

== See also ==
- Genesis creation narrative
