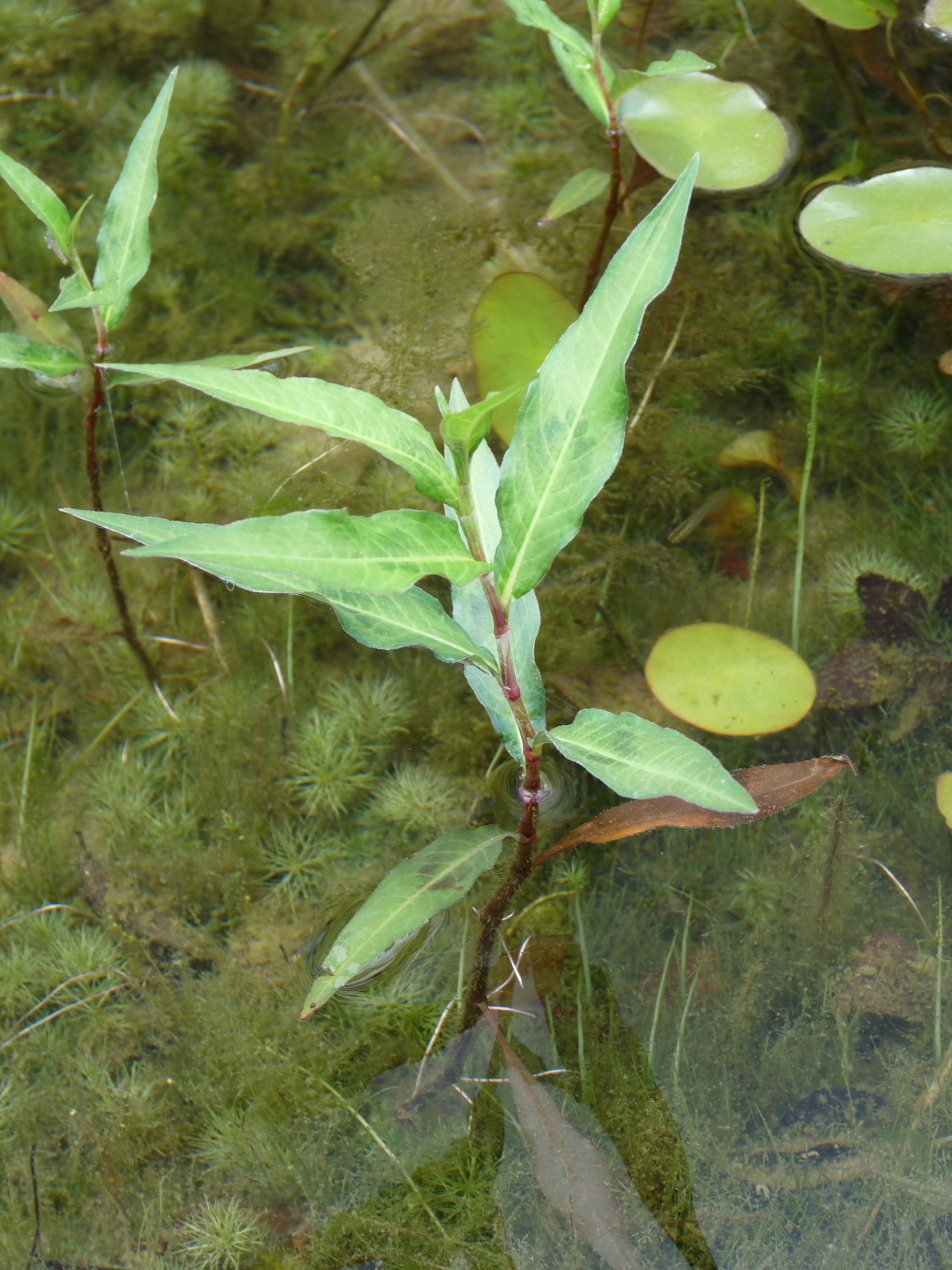

Conservation status
- Least Concern (IUCN 3.1)

Scientific classification
- Kingdom: Plantae
- Clade: Tracheophytes
- Clade: Angiosperms
- Clade: Eudicots
- Order: Caryophyllales
- Family: Polygonaceae
- Genus: Persicaria
- Species: P. hydropiper

Binomial name
- Persicaria hydropiper (L.) Delabre

Synonyms
- List: Persicaria acris Gray; Persicaria acris Gilib.; Persicaria fastigiatoramosa (Makino) Nakai; Persicaria koreana Nakai; Persicaria koreensis (Nakai) Nakai; Persicaria leblebicii (Yıld.) Raus; Persicaria maximowiczii (Regel) Nakai; Persicaria urens Garsault; Persicaria urens Montandon; Persicaria vernalis Nakai; Peutalis hydropiper (L.) Raf.; Polygonum acre Lam.; Polygonum chloroleucon Gand.; Polygonum ciliare Kitt.; Polygonum fallacinum Gand.; Polygonum fastigiatoramosum Makino; Polygonum flexuosum Gand.; Polygonum glandulosum Subba Rao; Polygonum glandulosum Poir.; Polygonum gracile Salisb.; Polygonum gracile R.Br.; Polygonum gramineum Meisn.; Polygonum hecasanthum Schur; Polygonum hispidum Buch.-Ham. ex D.Don; Polygonum hydropiper L.; Polygonum kinashii H.Lév. & Vaniot; Polygonum koreense Nakai; Polygonum leblebicii Yıld.; Polygonum maximowiczii Regel; Polygonum mite Wall.; Polygonum obtusifolium Schur; Polygonum pallidium Gand.; Polygonum podophyllum Gand.; Polygonum punctatum H.Lév.; Polygonum purpuratum Gand.; Polygonum sarbhanganicum Subba Rao; Polygonum schindleri Danser; Polygonum schinzii J.Schust.; Polygonum vernale (Nakai) Makino & Nemoto

= Persicaria hydropiper =

Water pepper

Plant species in the buckwheat family

Persicaria hydropiper (syn. Polygonum hydropiper), also known as water pepper, marshpepper knotweed, arse smart or tade, is a plant of the family Polygonaceae. A widespread species, Persicaria hydropiper is found in Australia, New Zealand, temperate Asia, Europe and North America. The plant grows in damp places and shallow water. Cultivated varieties are eaten in East Asia for their pungent flavor.

== Description ==
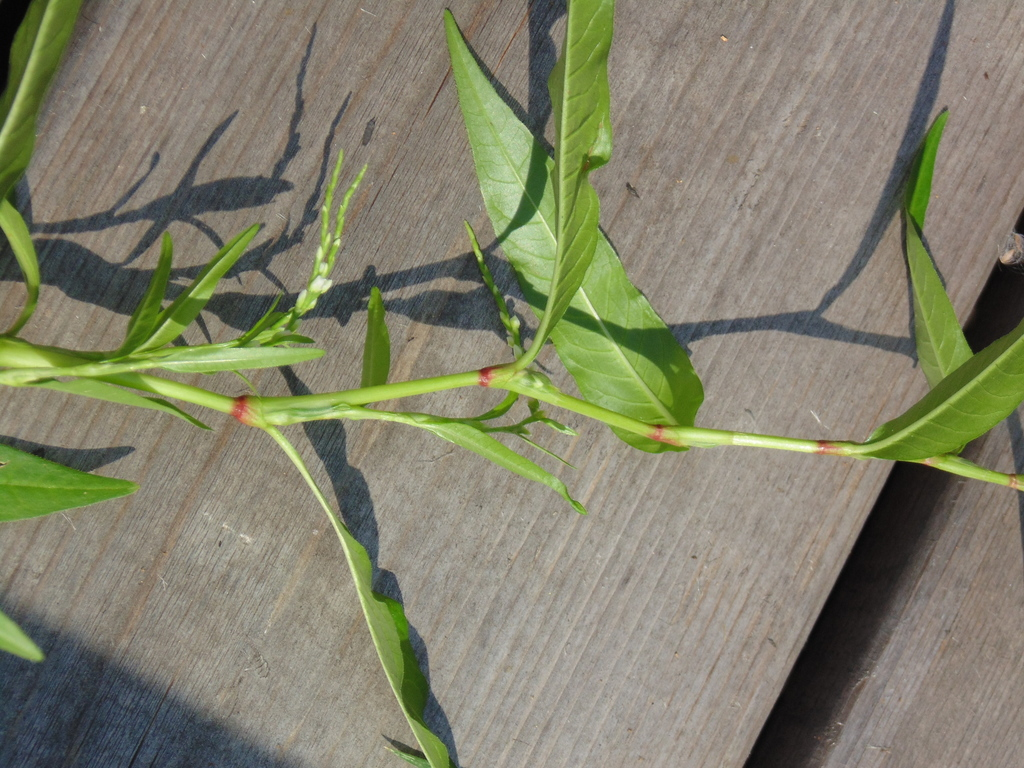
Stem of Persicaria hydropiper, showing sheathed 'nodes' at base of leaves

Water pepper is an annual herb with an erect stem growing to a height of 20 to 70 cm (8 to 28 in). The leaves are alternate and almost stalkless. The leaf blades are narrowly ovate and have entire margins fringed by very short hairs. They are tapering with a blunt apex. Each leaf base has stipules which are fused into a stem-enclosing sheath that is loose and fringed at the upper end. The inflorescence is a nodding spike. The perianth of each tiny flower consists of four or five segments, united near its green base and white or pink at the edges. There are six stamens, three fused carpels and three styles. The fruit is a dark brown oval, flattened nut.

P. hydropiper is an annual, and prefers damp environments for optimal growth; it will readily grow in riparian zones on the banks of streams and rivers, but can also grow in other areas where water collects, such as on the banks of canals, tyre and hoof tracks in woodlands, waterlogged soil, and around gates in fields. P. hydropiper is also tolerant of partial shade and base-poor soil. In the United Kingdom, where the plant is native, it can grow at any altitude between sea level and 505 metres.

== Biochemistry ==
Water pepper has several active ingredients. Two bicyclic sesquiterpenoids are present, polygodial (tadeonal, an unsaturated dialdehyde with a drimane backbone), and warburganal, which gives it its pungent taste. The plant also contains rutin, a source of the bitter taste impression.

Water pepper contains an essential oil (0.5%) which consists of monoterpenoids and sesquiterpenoids: α-pinene, β-pinene, 1,4-cineol, fenchone, α-humulene, β-caryophyllene, trans-β-bergamotene. Carboxylic acids (cinnamic, valeric and caproic acid) and their esters were present in traces. The composition depends strongly on genetic factors.

Wild water pepper produces oils that cause skin irritation.

== Taxonomy ==
In 1753 Carl Linnaeus named this species Polygonum hydropiper. It was moved to Persicaria in 1800 by Antoine Delarbre (1724-1813). Alongside the other species in its genus it is classified in the Polygonaceae family. It has five homotypic synonyms.

Table of Synonyms
Name	Year	Notes
Persicaria acris Gray	1821	nom. illeg. superfl.
Peutalis hydropiper (L.) Raf.	1837	
Polygonum acre Lam.	1779	nom. illeg. superfl.
Polygonum gracile Salisb.	1796	nom. illeg. superfl.
Polygonum hydropiper L.	1753	nom. cons.

== Range ==
The native range of water pepper includes all of Europe except for Iceland. Similarly it is native to almost all of Asia other than the Middle East, a few parts of northern China, Turkmenistan, and much of Indonesia. It is also a native plant of Australia except for the Northern Territory. In Africa it is native in Morocco and Algeria, but introduced to parts of South Africa. It is a widespread introduced plant in the United States and much of southern Canada. In South America it is found in Chile.

== Uses ==
Water pepper is eaten in Japan, where it is known as tade (蓼), or more specifically, yanagi tade (柳蓼). The leaves of cultivated plants are used as a vegetable, as the wild type has a far more pungent taste. The herb is usually sold in markets as seedlings. Young red sprouts are known as beni-tade (紅蓼), and are used to garnish sashimi, tempura, and sushi. It is popular for summer cooking. The seeds may also be added to wasabi.

Water pepper sauce, known as tade-zu (蓼酢), is a sauce traditionally made from finely chopped water pepper leaves, soaked in vinegar, and a small amount of steamed rice. Occasionally, the juice from a squeezed kabosu is added. In Japanese cuisine it is traditionally used as a complement to grilled freshwater fish, but not saltwater fish.

In China, water pepper is known as là liǎo (辣蓼) or shuǐ liǎo (水蓼), and used in traditional Chinese medicine.

In Indian traditional medicine, leaves of P. hydropiper are used against intestinal helminth infections. A study has proved that P. hydropiper leaves possess noteworthy anthelmintic efficacy and justify their use in traditional medicine against intestinal worms.

In Europe, water pepper was once cultivated and eaten during war time as a substitute for pepper.

The plant contains many acids, including formic acid, which makes it unpalatable to livestock. Though mammals do not eat wild water pepper, some insects do, giving rise to the Japanese saying "Tade kuu mushi mo sukizuki" (蓼食う虫も好き好き "Some insects eat water pepper and like it"), which may be translated as "There is no accounting for taste" or "Each to his own."

== Gallery ==
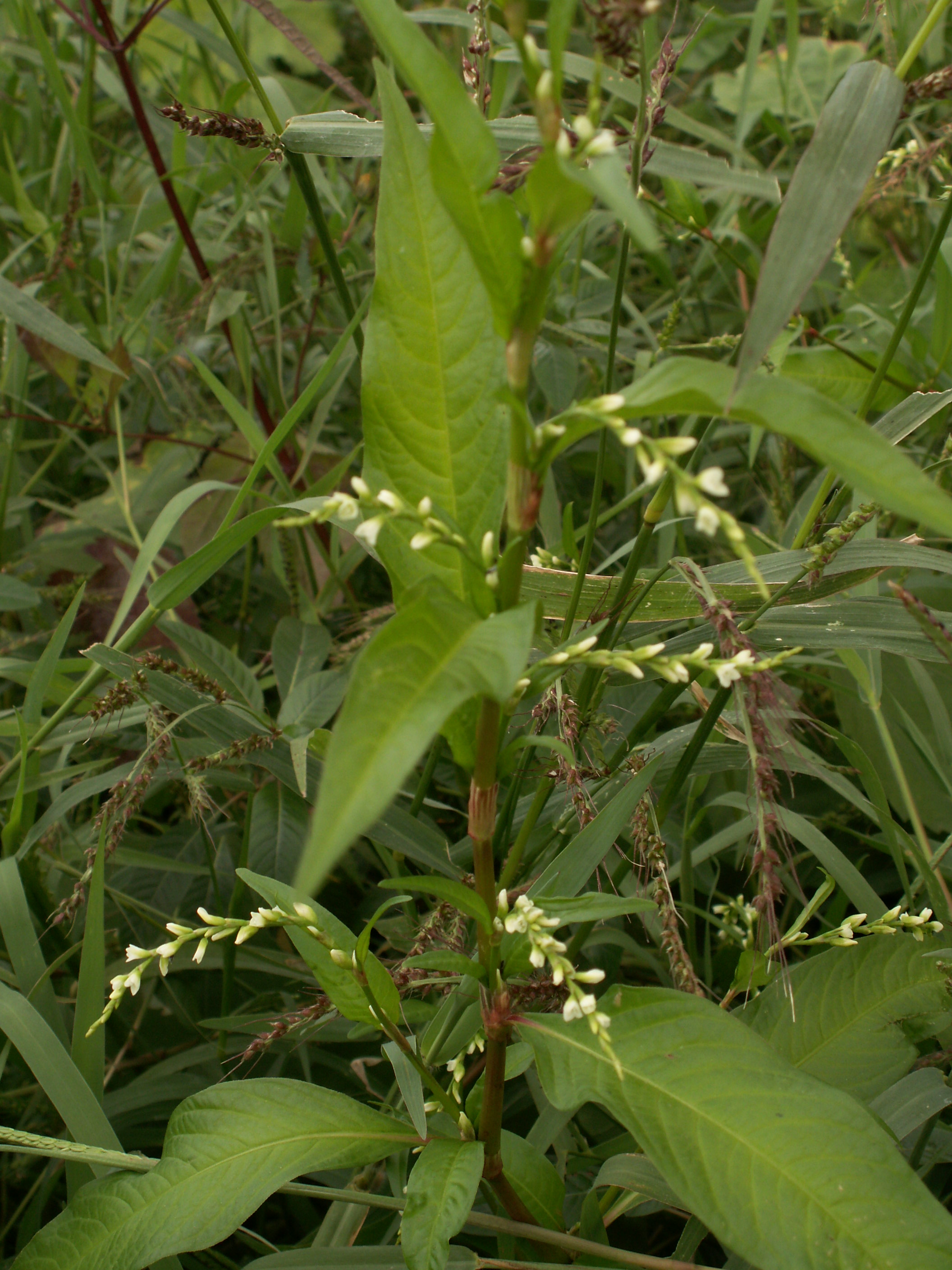

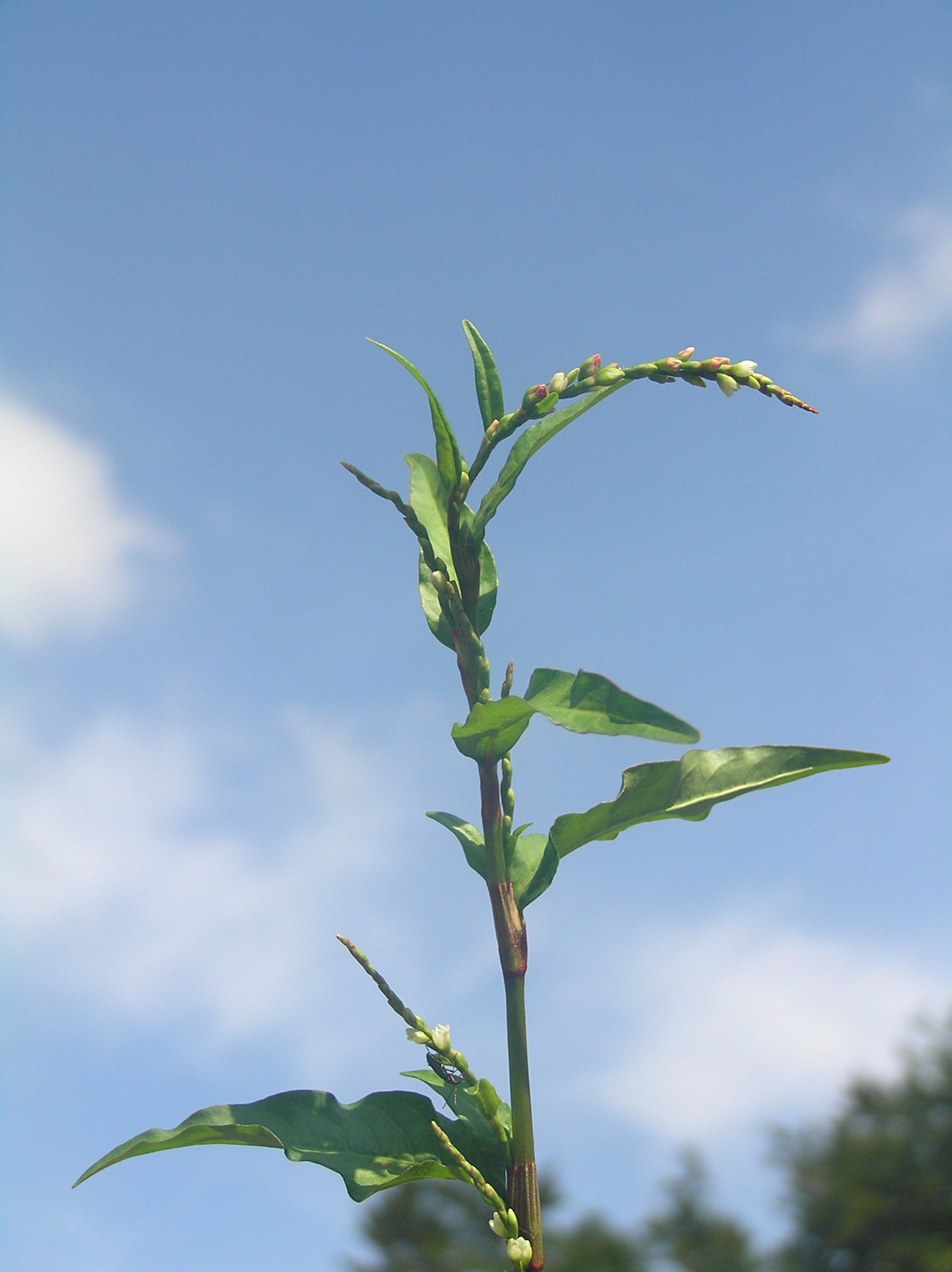

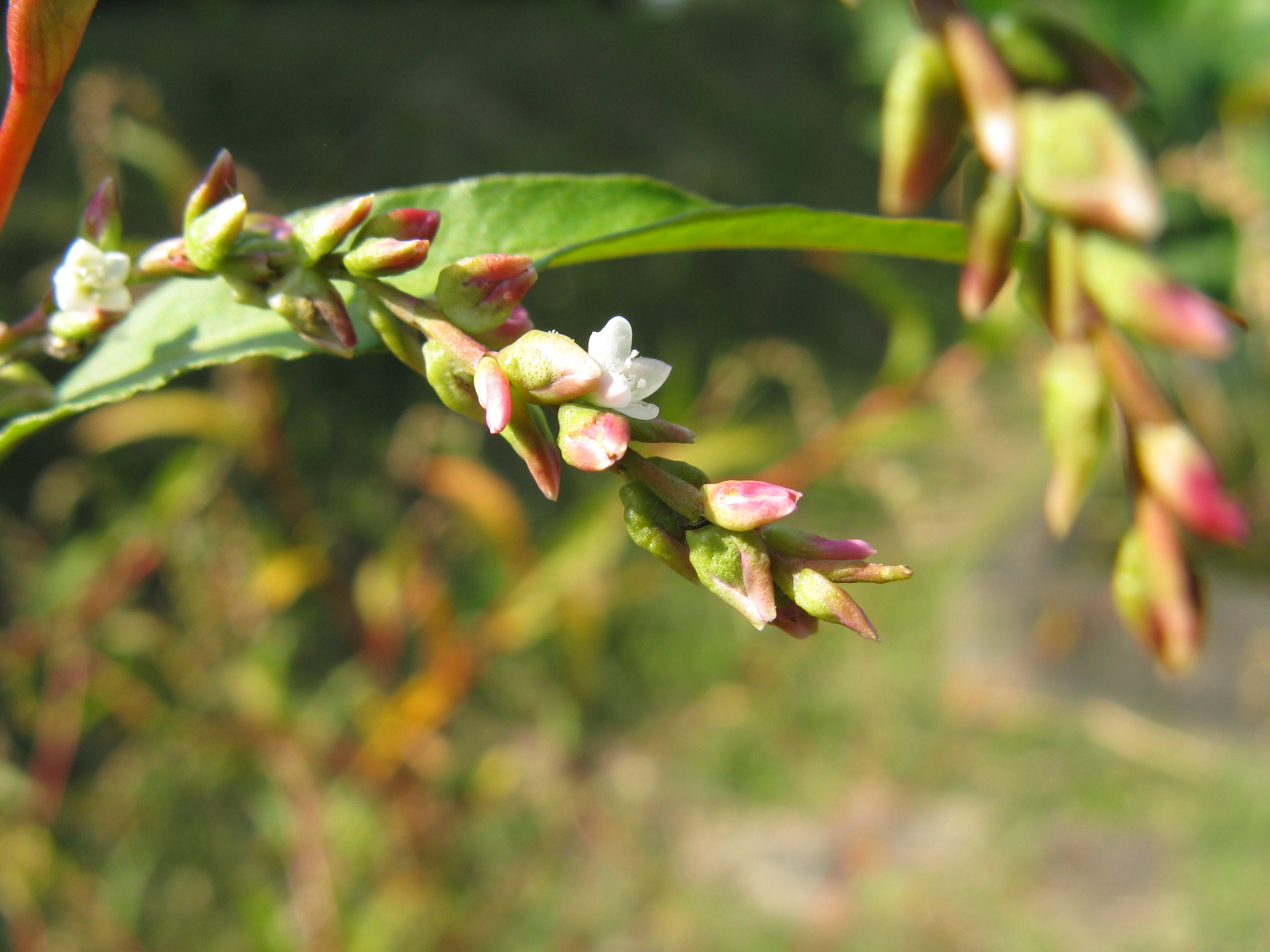

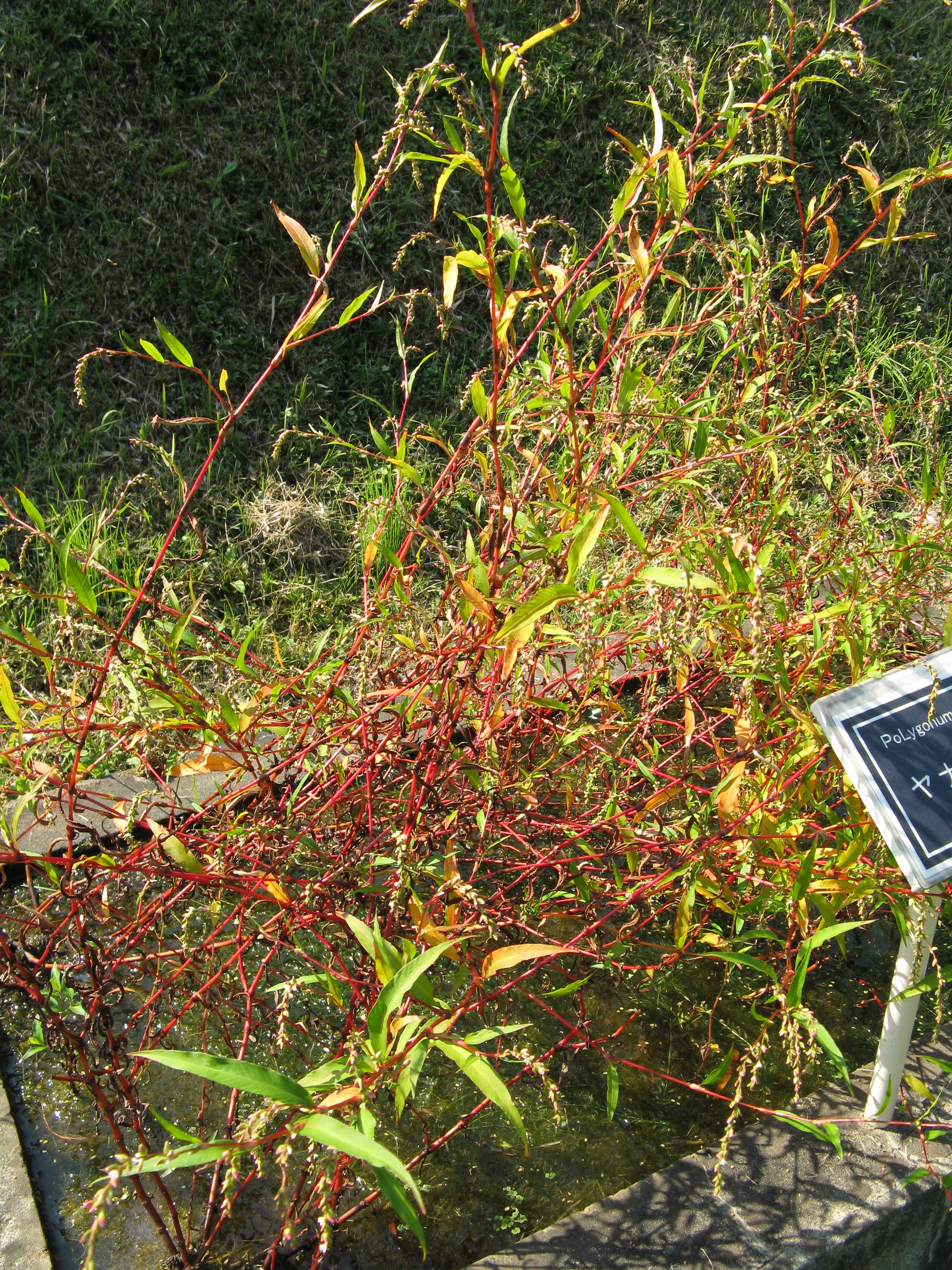

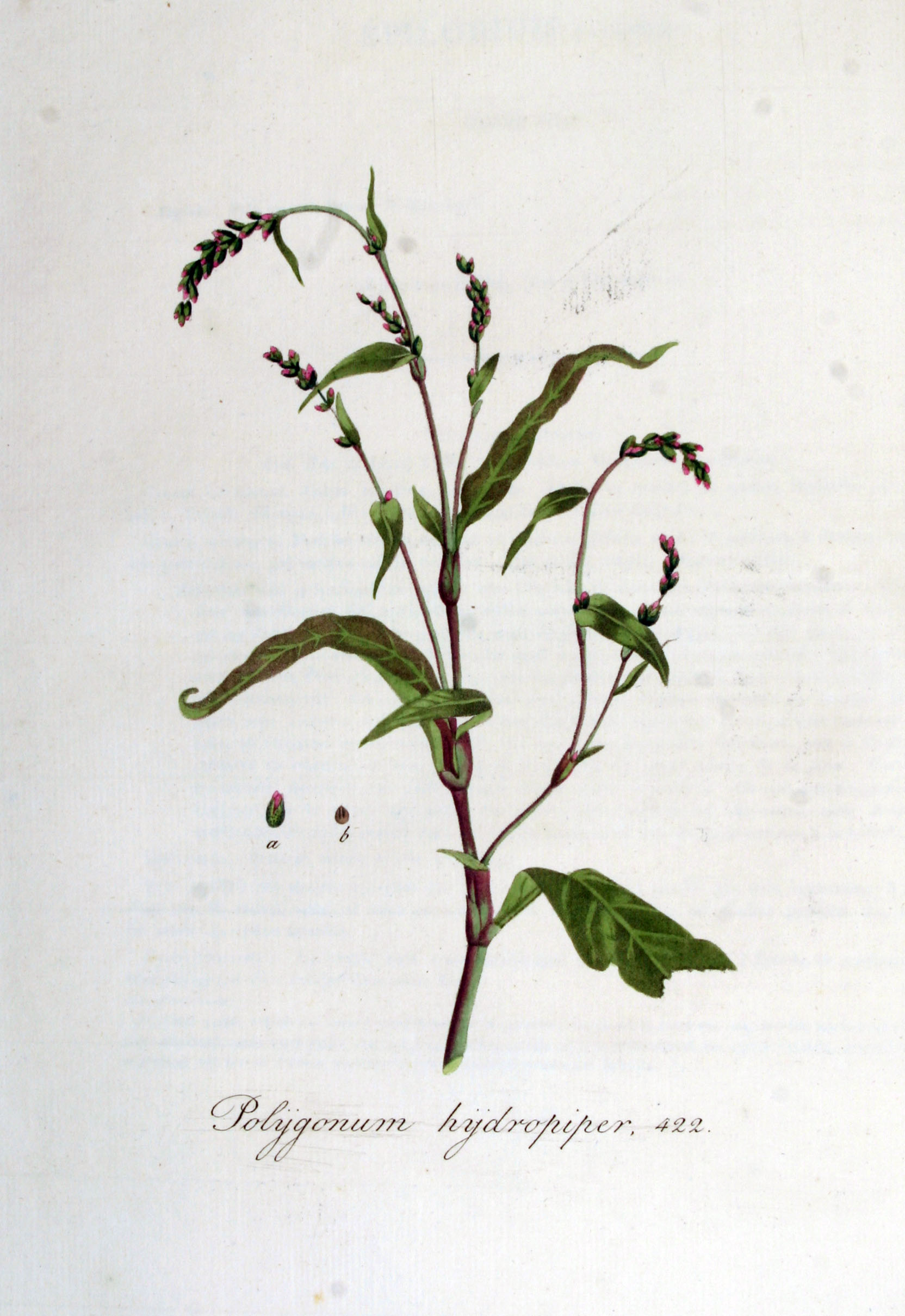
Illustration from Jan Kops' Flora Batava (1832)

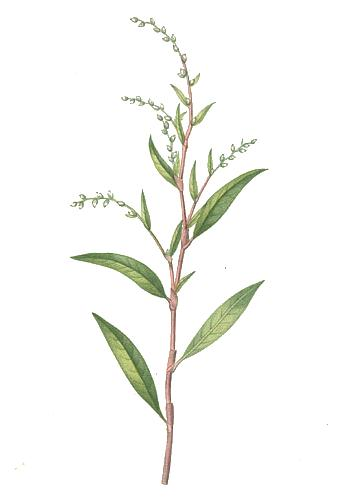
Illustration from La flore et la pomone françaises (1832)

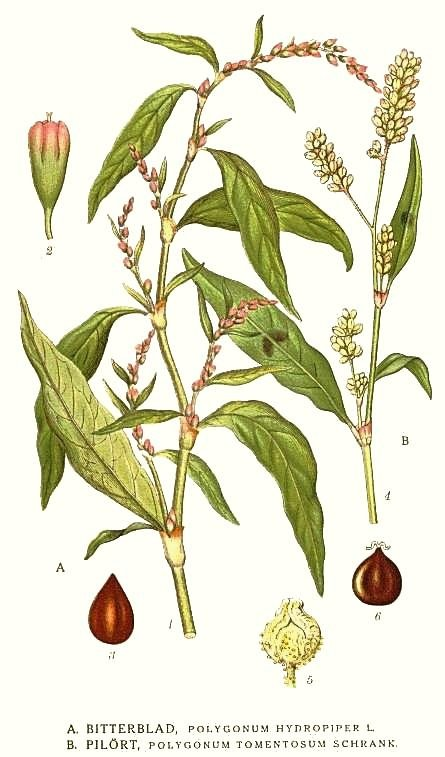
Illustration from Bilder ur Nordens Flora (1917–1926)

== See also ==
- Rui-be
