= Jinjitsu =

Japanese seasonal festival

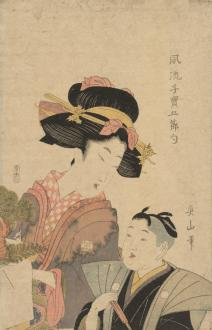

Jinjitsu (人日, "Human Day") is one of the five seasonal festivals (五節句 gosekku) that were integrated into the Japanese Imperial calendar over 1,000 years ago. Sekku is the term given meaning special day of observance. The festival is now celebrated on the seventh day of the first month and is considered a part of the New Year observances that are celebrated during this time.

It is also known as Nanakusa-no-sekku, the "Feast of Seven Herbs", from the custom of eating seven-herb kayu (七草粥 nanakusa-gayu) to ensure good health and to ward off away evil spirits in the coming new year. The name "Day of Mankind" generates from the stipulation of no harm coming to humans on this day and the name "Festival of The Seven Herbs" comes from a tradition of store owners gathering and providing the seven lucky herbs to the emperor as nanakusagayu. The typical herbs used for the creation of nanakusagayu are nazuna, seri, gogyo, hotokenza, suzushiro, and hakobe. However, in some regions other variations are used.

The tradition of eating nanakusagayu on the seventh day spread during the Heian period and by the Edo period those below the shōgun would consume it the morning of this day prior to coming together to address the shōgun. Another piece of reasoning behind the Japanese people eating nanakusagayu on the seventh day, Jinjitsu, is because it is also used as a day of rest. The soup mixture is easy on the stomach and is consumed to rest the digestive system that may have been weakened by the food that is consumed during the first days of the New Year.

The name and tradition are derived from an ancient Chinese custom called Renri which means the day humans were born, whereby each of the opening days of the first lunar month were assigned to a particular creature or animal, which it was forbidden to kill or lay harm to on that day: thus the first seven days of the month were Chicken Day, Dog Day, Boar Day, Sheep Day, Cow Day, Horse Day, and Human Day. On these days, no harm was caused to these animals and on the seventh day there were no punishments handed out to criminals. It is also a legend that the goddess Nüwa created the world and created animals on different days and humans were on the 7th day.

The celebration of the feast in Japan was moved from the 7th day of the first lunar month to the 7th day of January during the Meiji period, when Japan adopted the solar calendar during its time of reform from isolationism to a more modern, global form of government. Also included in some the celebrations are the singing of folk songs or nanakusabayashi which are performed in some areas throughout Japan. Tradition runs strong throughout Japan and this is one of many that have stuck around over the centuries.
