= Drimane =

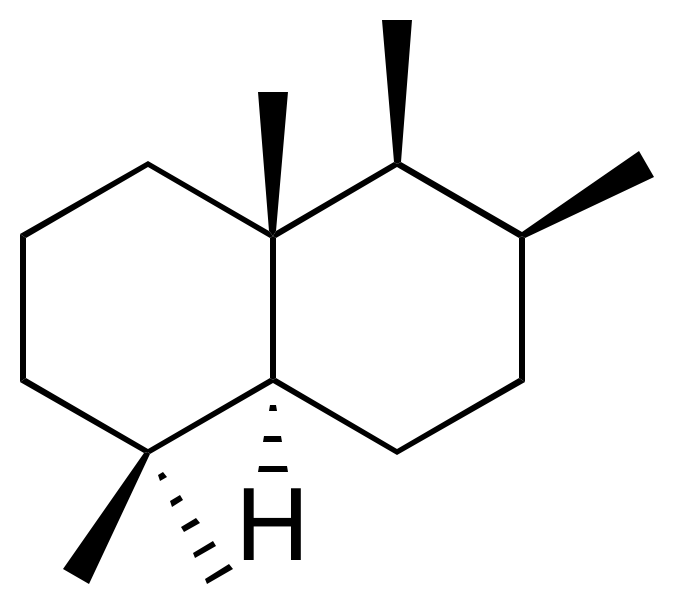

Names
- IUPAC name Drimane
- Systematic IUPAC name (4aR,5S,6S,8aS)-1,1,4a,5,6-Pentamethyldecahydronaphthalene

Identifiers
CAS Number	5951-58-6
3D model (JSmol)	Interactive image
Beilstein Reference	2959385
ChemSpider	7827642
PubChem CID	606283
UNII	B6L7EVH458
CompTox Dashboard (EPA)	DTXSID70974921
- InChI: InChI=1S/C15H28/c1-11-7-8-13-14(3,4)9-6-10-15(13,5)12(11)2/h11-13H,6-10H2,1-5H3 Key: CVRSZZJUWRLRDE-UHFFFAOYSA-N
- SMILES: C[C@H]1CC[C@@H]2[C@@]([C@H]1C)(CCCC2(C)C)C

Properties
Chemical formula	C_{15}H_{28}
Molar mass	208.389 g·mol^{−1}
- Except where otherwise noted, data are given for materials in their standard state (at 25 °C [77 °F], 100 kPa). Infobox references

Drimane is a bicyclic sesquiterpene. It is the parent structure of many natural products with various biological activity.

Among the notable drimanes are:

- Polygodial, found in several different plants
- Multiple compounds found in several members of the family Canellaceae
