= Rui-be =

Japanese frozen raw salmon dish

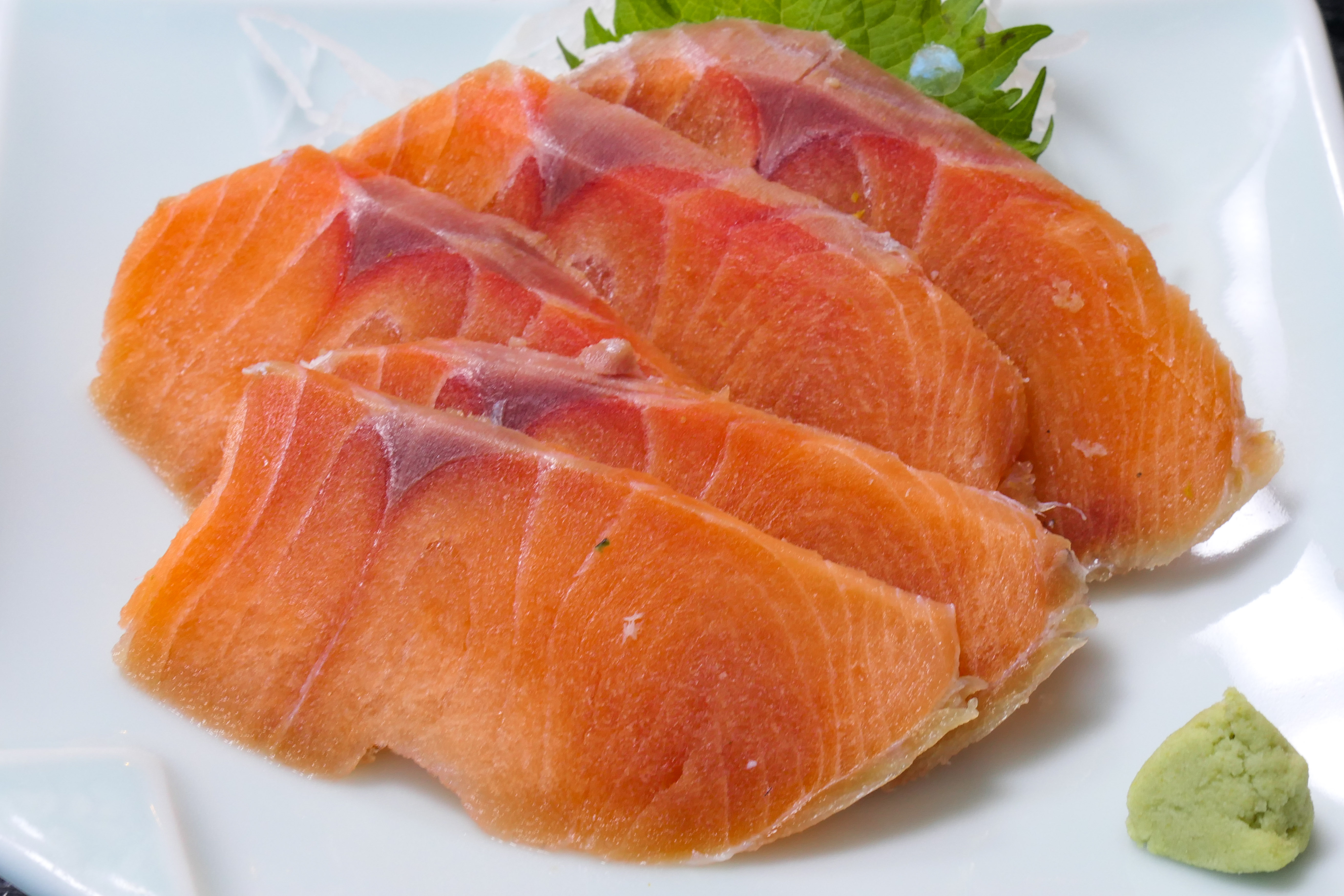
Salmon rui-be

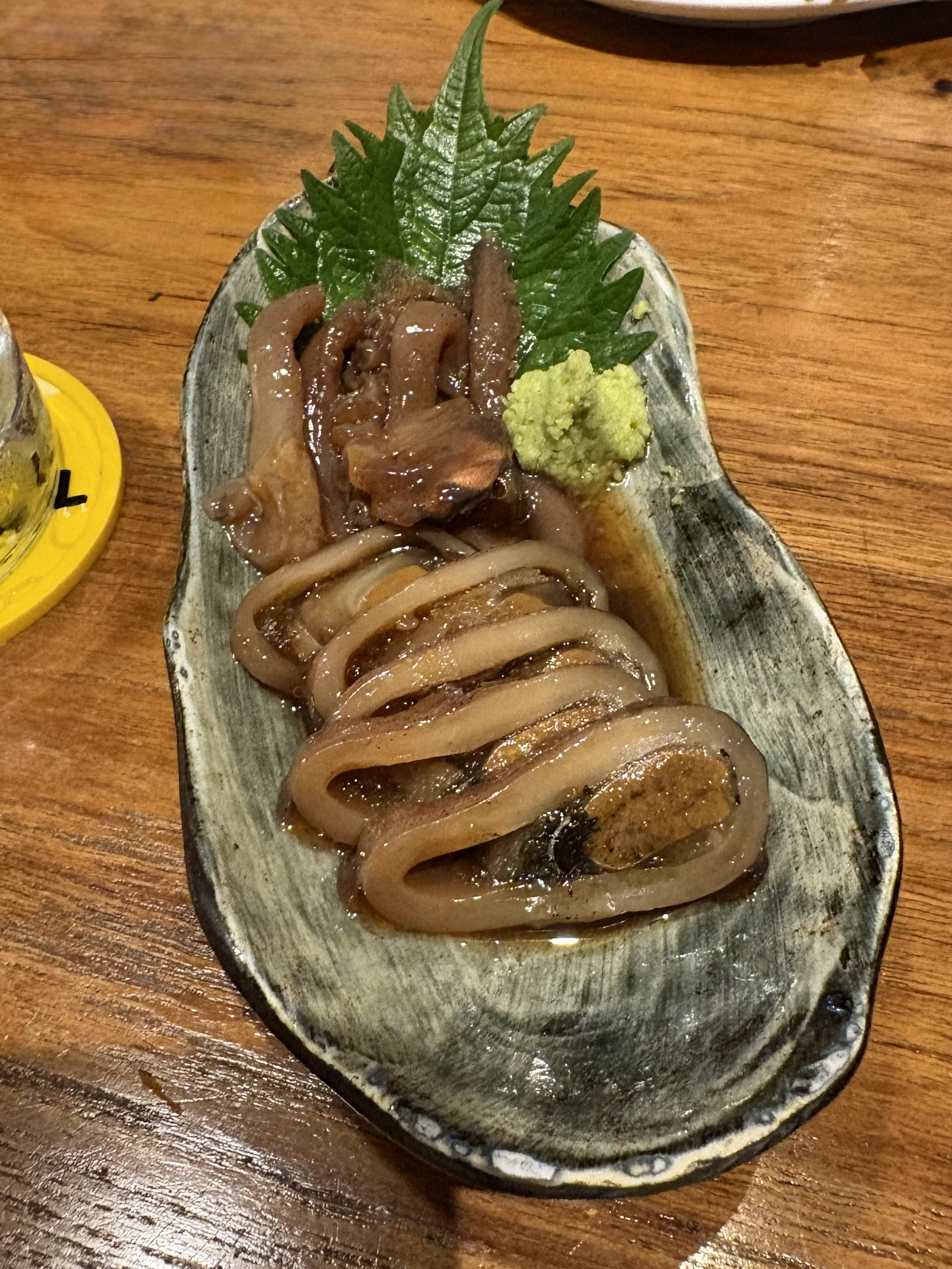
Ika rui-be

Rui-be or ruibe (ルイベ) is a dish of the Ainu people of northern Japan, consisting of seafood that is frozen outdoors, sliced like sashimi, and served with soy sauce and water pepper.

== See also ==
- Hoe (food)
- Kuai (dish)
- Stroganina
