= Kuai (dish) =

Historical Chinese raw meat or fish dish

- Traditional Chinese: 膾
- Simplified Chinese: 脍
Transcriptions
Standard Mandarin
- Hanyu Pinyin: kuài
Yue: Cantonese
- Yale Romanization: kui2
Southern Min
- Hokkien POJ: kòe

Kuai (Chinese: 膾 or 鱠) was a Chinese dish consisting of finely cut strips of raw meat or fish, which was popular in the early Chinese dynasties. According to the Book of Rites compiled between 202 BCE and 220 CE, kuai consists of small thin slices or strips of raw meat, which are prepared by first thinly slicing the meat and then cutting the thin slices into strips. In modern times, the dishes are more often referred to as "raw fish slices" (生魚片; shēngyú piàn) or as "yusheng" (魚生; yúshēng). The type of fish commonly used in ancient times included carp (鯉) and mandarin fish (鱖), while in modern times salmon (鮭) is commonly used.

Sauces were an essential part of kuai dishes, with scallions used for preparation of sauces in spring and mustard seed used for sauces in autumn. According to many classical texts, kuai served without sauces was deemed inedible and should be avoided.

== History ==
Raw fish and meat dishes, known collectively as kuai, were first documented in China in the Zhou dynasty (1045–256 BC), and are mentioned in the Classic of Poetry, Classic of Rites, Analects and Mencius. A related preparation method is xuan (軒), which involve slicing the raw meat in large thin pieces in the manner of carpaccio, however the term kuai was used to refer to this method. Kuai is the preferred preparation of raw beef and lamb, or fish such as the carp, while meat from wild deer and boar were prepared as xuan. Thinness in the slices or strips was an important factor for judging the quality of the dish. During the Zhou dynasty and the Warring States period, kuai made from all fauna were widely consumed.

During the time of the Qin (221–206 BCE) and Han (206 BCE–220 CE) dynasties, kuai made from the meat of land fauna became less popular with the term used to refer more and more to thinly sliced raw fish. The dish was widely consumed by all classes and coincides with the appearance of the character kuài (鱠) with its fish radical (魚) during this period (alongside the character 膾 with the "" meat radical). In addition, characters such as huì (燴) with the fire radical (火) were introduced to indicate fish that has grilled to the rare stage and then thinly sliced, similar to Japanese tataki. Indeed, kuai and raw fish were so commonly consumed that Ying Shao wrote in the Fengsu Tongyi, a manuscript that described the odd and exotic practices of various cultures and peoples, that "in Zhu and E, raw fish is not consumed", alluding to the perceived oddity of not eating fish raw. It is also during this period that the renowned dish jinji yukuai (金齏玉膾) along its accompanying baheji sauce (八和齏) was created.

Although the dish was not widely consumed in later Chinese dynasties, it enjoyed a very high status in Chinese cuisine. Chinese physicians of the time sometimes recommended against it due to the very real possibility of serious illness due to flukes and other parasitic organisms; however, many prominent Chinese individuals (including Cao Zhi and Chen Deng) maintained a strong affinity for the dish. It was thought that the application of strongly flavored spices such as mustard or Sichuan pepper could render the dish safe to consume.

Consumption of kuai in China declined sharply by the time of the Qing dynasty. Since that time, most Chinese food has been cooked, though a Chaozhou (Teochew) dish called yusheng uses raw fish as its primary ingredient.

== See also ==
- Carpaccio
- Hoe (dish)
- Rui-be
- Sashimi
- Steak tartare
