= Salmon as food =

Fish used for eating

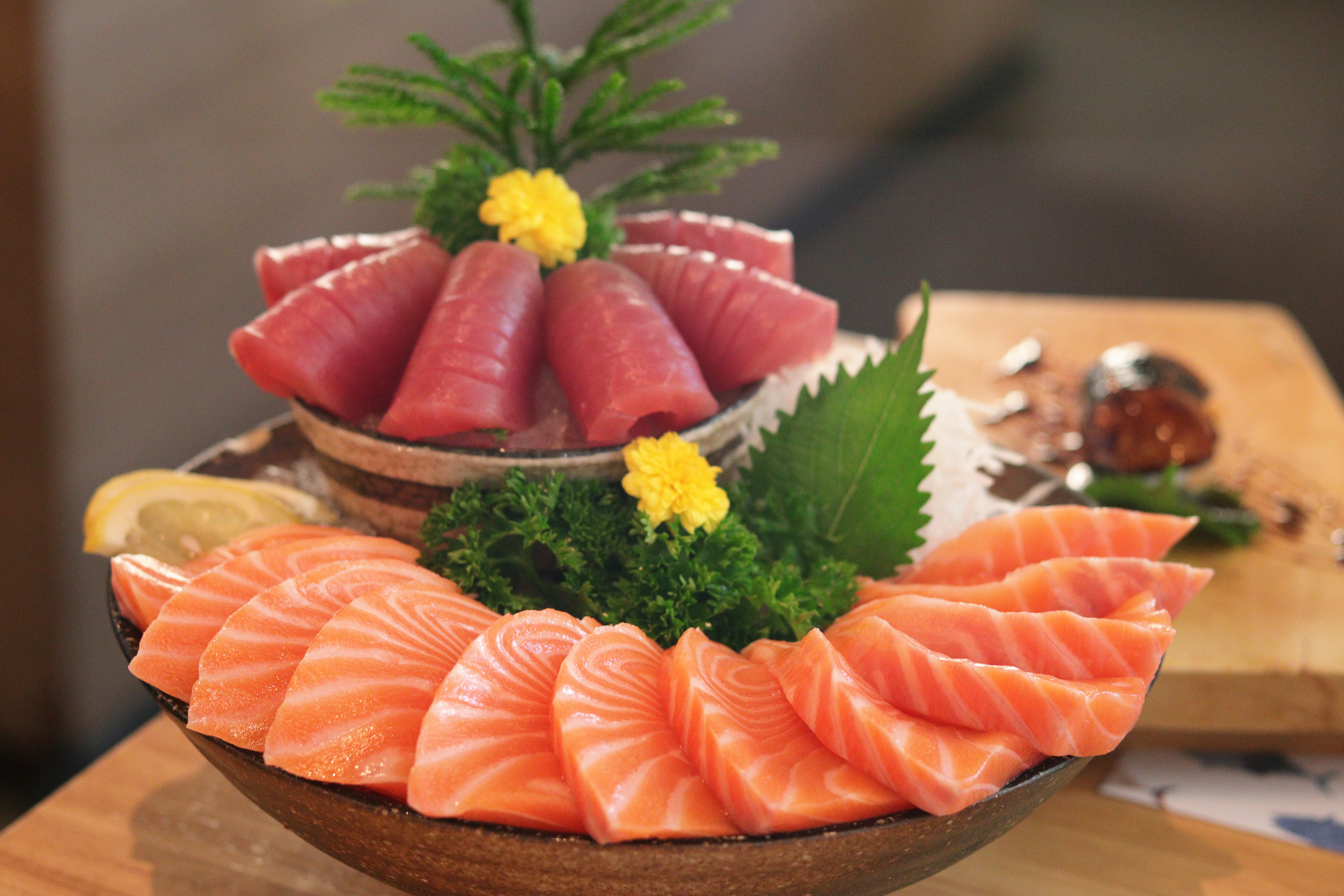
Salmon sashimi

Salmon is a common food fish classified as an oily fish with a rich content of protein and omega-3 fatty acids. Norway is a major producer of farmed and wild salmon, accounting for more than 50% of global salmon production. Farmed and wild salmon differ only slightly in terms of food quality and safety, with farmed salmon having lower content of environmental contaminants, and wild salmon having higher content of omega-3 fatty acids.

== Colour ==
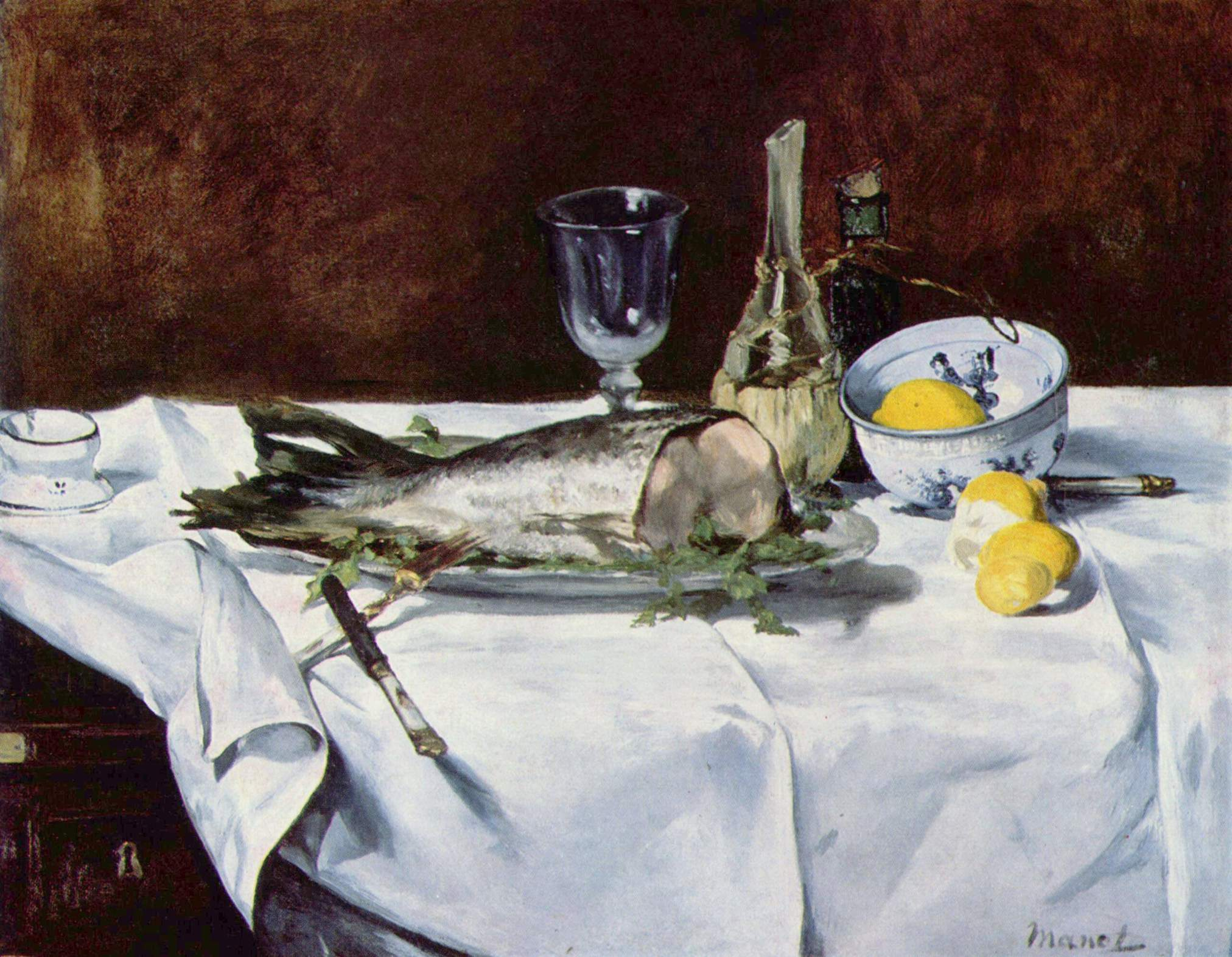
Still Life with Salmon, 1866–1869, by Édouard Manet, shows a white-fleshed salmon

Salmon flesh is often orange to red, although there are some examples of white-fleshed wild salmon. The natural color of salmon results from carotenoid pigments, largely astaxanthin and canthaxanthin in the flesh. Wild salmon get these carotenoids from eating krill and other tiny shellfish.

The concentration of carotenoids exceeds 8 mg/kg of flesh, and all fish producers try to reach a level that represents a value of 16 on the "Roche Colour Card", a colour card used to show how pink the fish will appear at specific doses. This scale is specific for measuring the pink colour due to astaxanthin and is not for the orange hue obtained with canthaxanthin. The development of processing and storage operations, which can be detrimental on canthaxanthin flesh concentration, has led to an increased quantity of pigments added to the diet to compensate for the degrading effects of the processing. In wild fish, carotenoid levels of up to 25 mg are present, but levels of canthaxanthin are, in contrast, minor.

== Nutrition ==
Raw wild Atlantic salmon
Nutritional value per 100 g (3.5 oz)
- Energy: 142 kcal (590 kJ)
- Fat: 6.34 g
- Saturated: 1.0 g
- Monounsaturated: 2.1 g
- Polyunsaturated omega−3 omega−6: 2.5 g 2018 mg 172 mg
- Protein: 19.84 g
Vitamins and minerals
Vitamins	Quantity %DV^{†}
Vitamin A	40 IU
Thiamine (B1)	19% 0.226 mg
Riboflavin (B2)	29% 0.380 mg
Niacin (B3)	49% 7.860 mg
Pantothenic acid (B5)	23% 1.164 mg
Vitamin B6	48% 0.818 mg
Folate (B9)	6% 25 μg
Vitamin B12	133% 3.2 μg
Minerals	Quantity %DV^{†}
Calcium	1% 12 mg
Copper	33% 0.3 mg
Iron	4% 0.80 mg
Magnesium	7% 29 mg
Phosphorus	16% 200 mg
Potassium	16% 490 mg
Selenium	66% 36.5 μg
Sodium	2% 44 mg
Zinc	6% 0.64 mg
- Other constituents: Quantity
- Water: 68.50 g
- Cholesterol: 55 mg
- Link to USDA Database entry
- ^{†}Percentages estimated using US recommendations for adults, except for potassium, which is estimated based on expert recommendation from the National Academies.

Raw wild salmon is 69% water, 20% protein, 6% fat, and contains no carbohydrates (table). In a reference amount of 100 g (3.5 oz), raw salmon supplies 142 calories, and is a rich source (20% or more of the Daily Value, DV) of several B vitamins, especially vitamin B12, copper, and selenium. Dietary minerals in moderate content are phosphorus and potassium (table).

== Contaminants ==
PCBs, metformin, and mercury are some of the pollutants found in wild salmon, caught close to wastewater treatment plants of major metropolitan areas in the United States’ Pacific Northwest.

== Allergy ==
Salmon is a known allergen. A case has been described where a female physician, despite previously having no known allergy to salmon, had 3 instances of allergic reactions after eating salmon.

== Impact on wild populations ==
Some environmental groups have advocated favoring certain salmon catches over others.

== Products ==
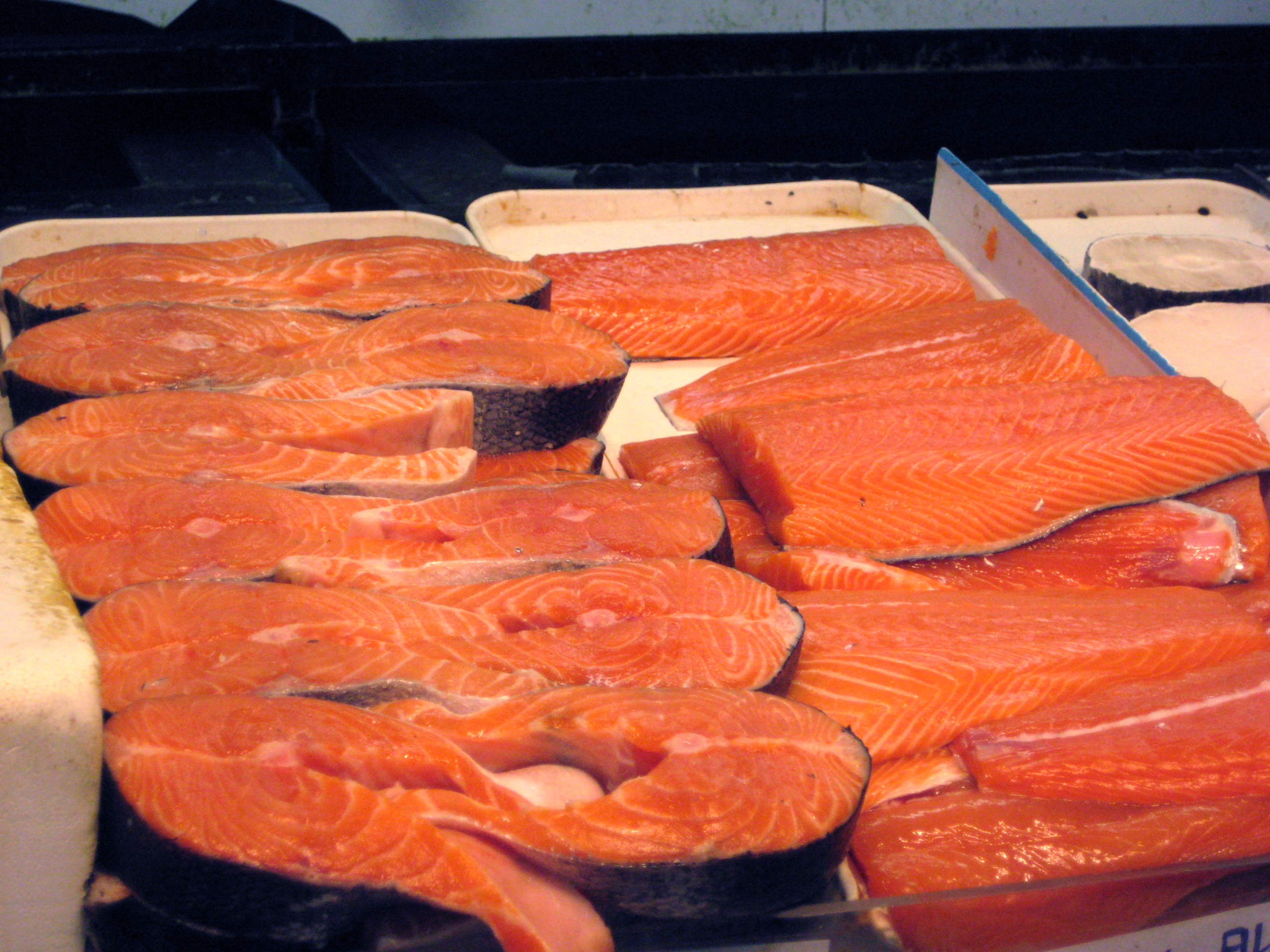
Salmon steak (left) and fillets (right) in a market

Most Atlantic salmon available on the world market are farmed, whereas the majority of Pacific salmon are wild-caught.

Canned salmon in the U.S. is usually wild from the Pacific Ocean, though some farmed salmon is available in cans. Smoked salmon is another preparation method, and can either be hot- or cold-smoked. Lox can refer either to cold-smoked salmon or to salmon cured in a brine solution (also called gravlax). Traditional canned salmon includes some skin (which is harmless) and bone (which adds calcium). Skinless and boneless canned salmon is also available.

Raw salmon flesh may contain Anisakis nematodes, marine parasites that cause anisakiasis. Before the availability of refrigeration, Japan did not consume raw salmon. Salmon and salmon roe have only recently come into use in making sashimi (raw fish) and sushi, with the introduction of parasite-free Norwegian salmon in the late 1980s.

Ordinary types of cooked salmon contain 500–1,500 mg DHA and 300–1,000 mg EPA (two similar species of fatty acids) per 100 grams

== Dishes ==
Name	Image	Origin	Description
Gravlax		Nordic	Raw salmon cured in salt, sugar, and dill. Usually served as an appetiser, sliced thinly and accompanied by hovmästarsås (also known as gravlaxsås), a dill and mustard sauce, either on bread of some kind, or with boiled potatoes.
Lohikeitto		Nordic (usually associated with Finland)	A creamy salmon soup consisting of salmon fillets, boiled potatoes and leeks, served hot with some dill.
Lomi salmon		Polynesian	A side dish consisting of fresh tomato and salmon salad. It was introduced to Hawaiians by early western sailors. It is typically prepared by mixing raw salted, diced salmon with tomatoes, sweet gentle Maui onions (or sometimes green onion), and occasionally flakes of hot red chili pepper, or crushed ice. It is always served cold. Other variations include salmon, diced tomato, diced cucumber, and chopped sweet onion.
Lox		European (Ashkenazi) Jewish	A fillet that has been cured. In its most popular form, it is thinly sliced—less than 5 millimetres (0.2 in) in thickness—and, typically (in North America), served on a bagel, often with cream cheese, onion, tomato, cucumber and capers. Lox in small pieces is also often added and cooked into scrambled eggs, sometimes with chopped onion.
Rui-be		Japan	Salmon that is frozen outdoors, sliced like sashimi, and served with soy sauce and water peppers.
Salmon burger			A type of fishcake made mostly from salmon in the style of a hamburger. It is challenging to make and cook as the salmon requires a binder to make it stick together and is easy to overcook which makes it too dry. Salmon burgers are especially common in Alaska where they are routinely offered as an alternative to beef hamburgers.
Salmon tartare			Appetiser prepared with fresh raw salmon and seasonings, commonly spread on a cracker or artisan style bread
Smoked salmon			A preparation of salmon, typically a fillet that has been cured and then hot or cold smoked. Due to its moderately high price, smoked salmon is considered a delicacy. Although the term lox is sometimes applied to smoked salmon, they are different products.
Salmon sashimi		Japan	Sliced raw salmon served with garnishes. Usually eaten by dipping in soy sauce and wasabi.
Salmon sushi		Japan	Sliced raw salmon rolled with rice and sometimes nori (seaweed) as makizushi or placed on top of rice as nigiri sushi, served with garnishes. Usually eaten by dipping in soy sauce and wasabi.
Kippered salmon		Hupa, Karuk, Yurok	Salmon smoked using fruitwood until cooked on the outside but raw on the inside, then canned and pressure cooked. Can be seasoned with red pepper and other seasonings.

== Gallery ==
Further images
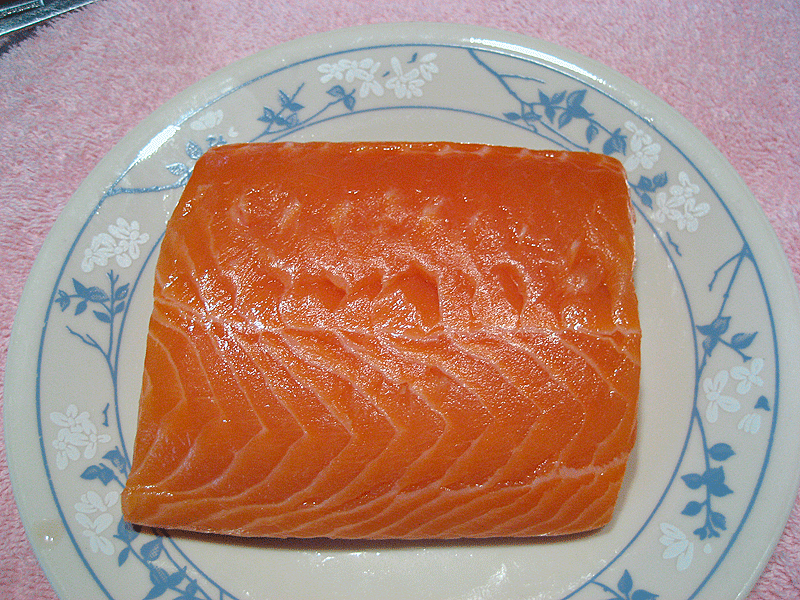
Filet of an Atlantic salmon

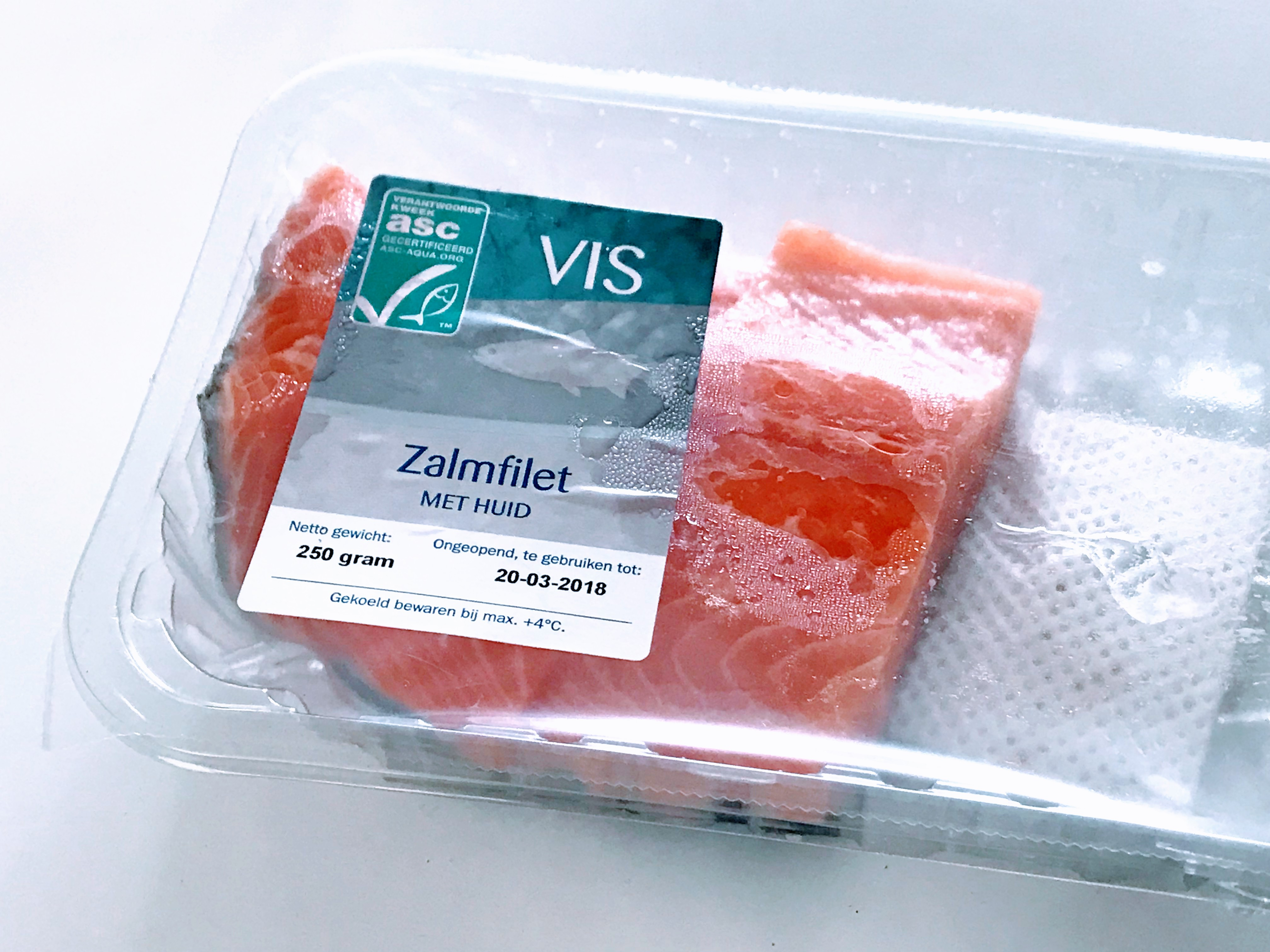
Salmon filet as sold in supermarkets

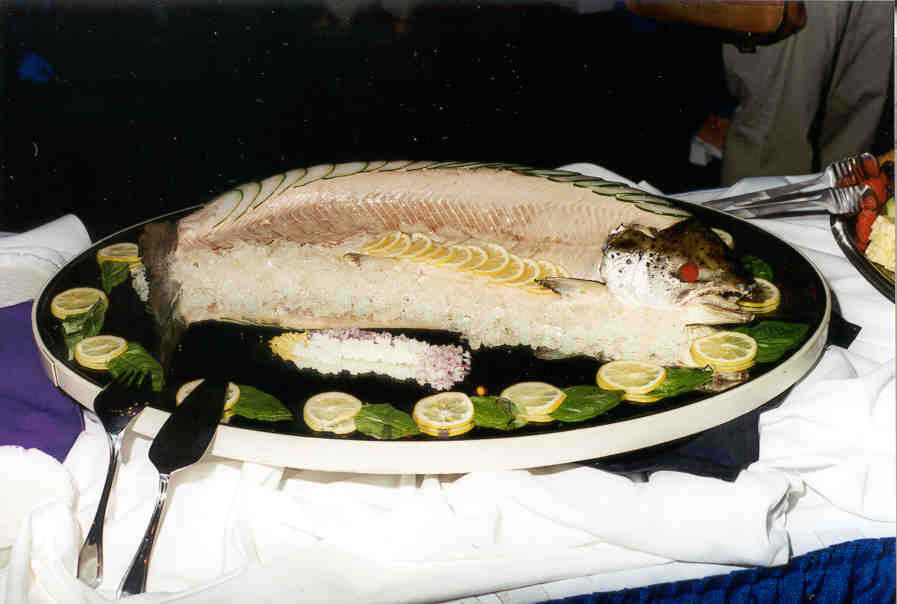
Poached salmon

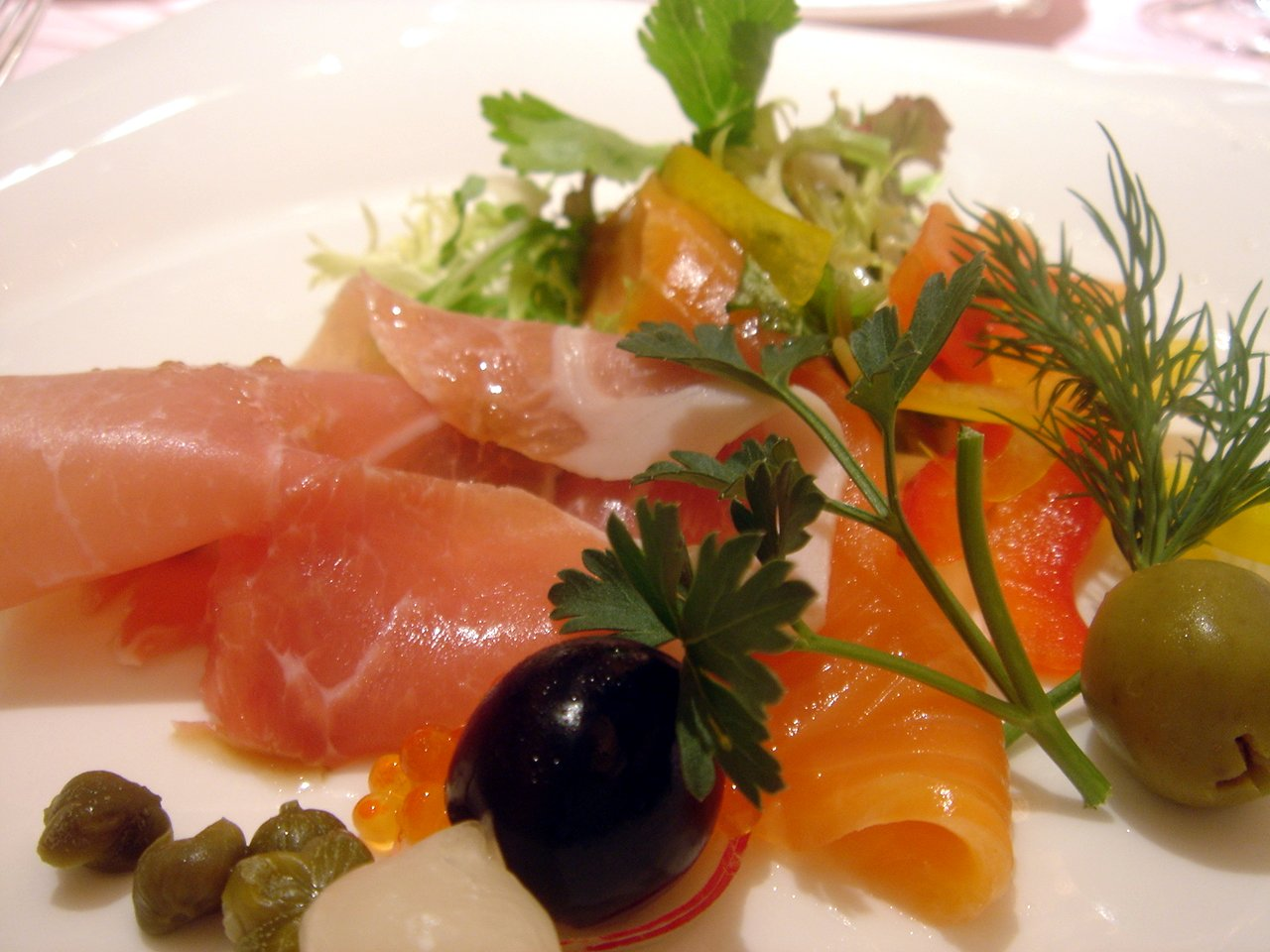
Salad with ham and smoked salmon

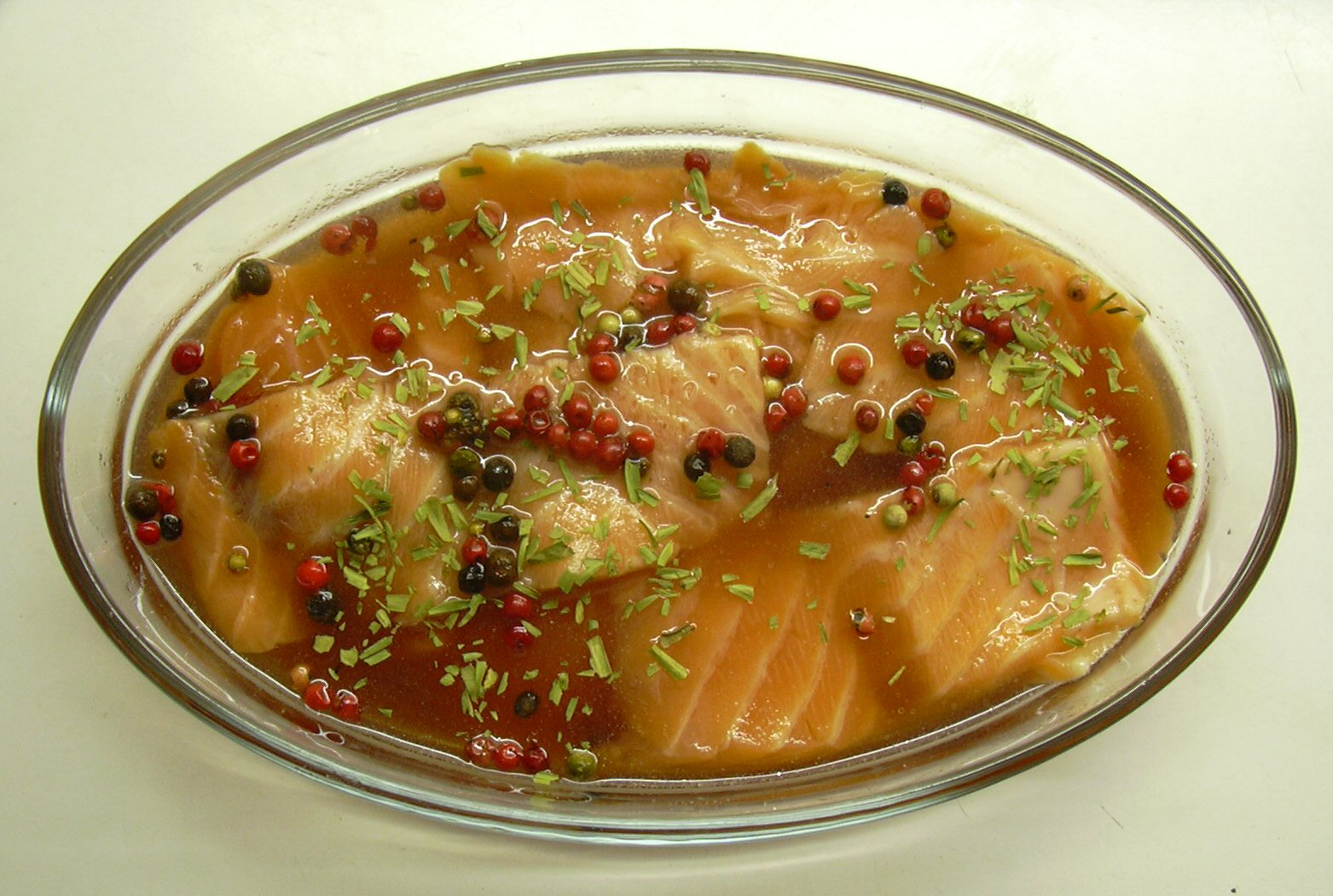
Salmon in marinade

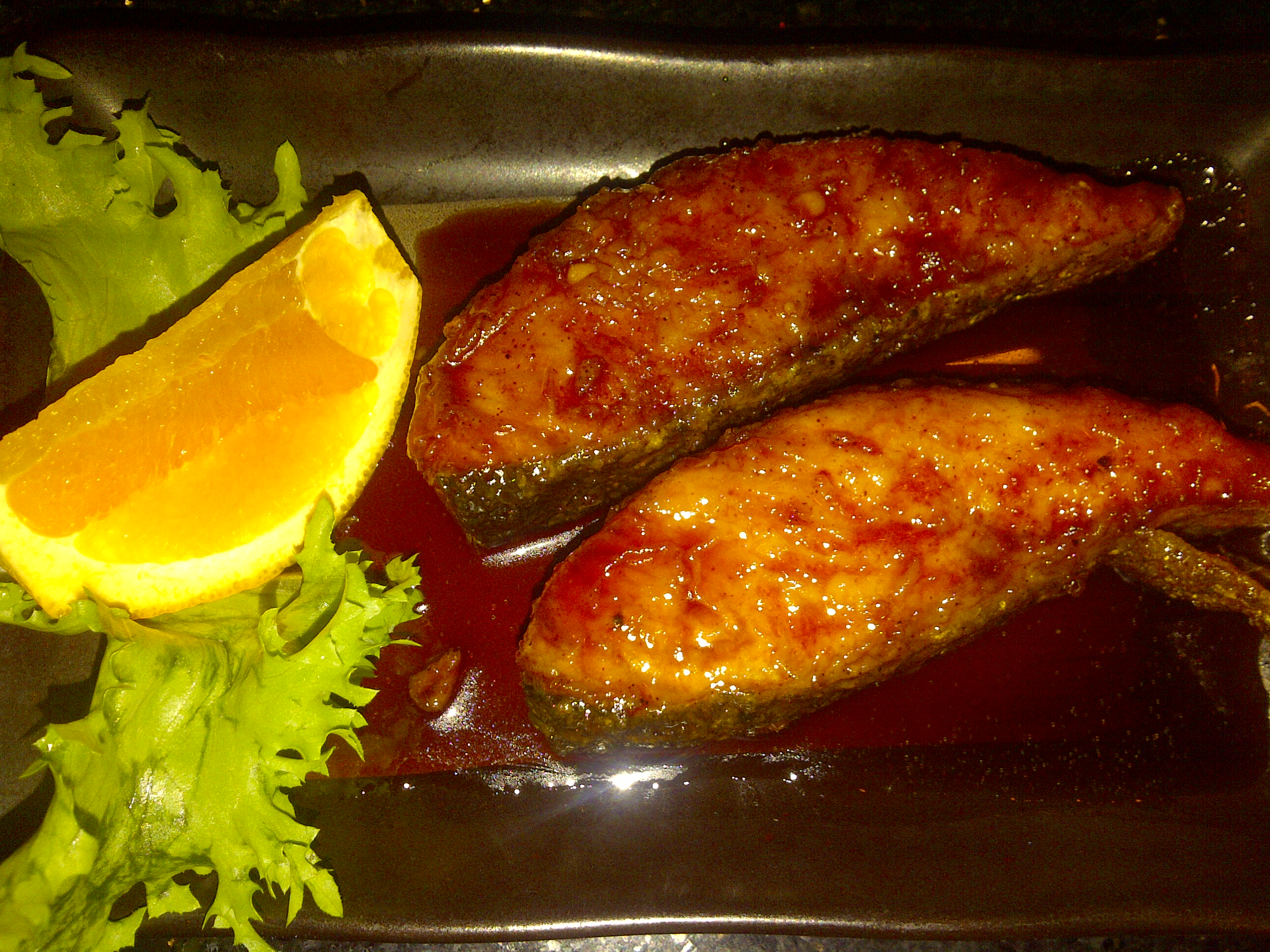
Salmon teriyaki

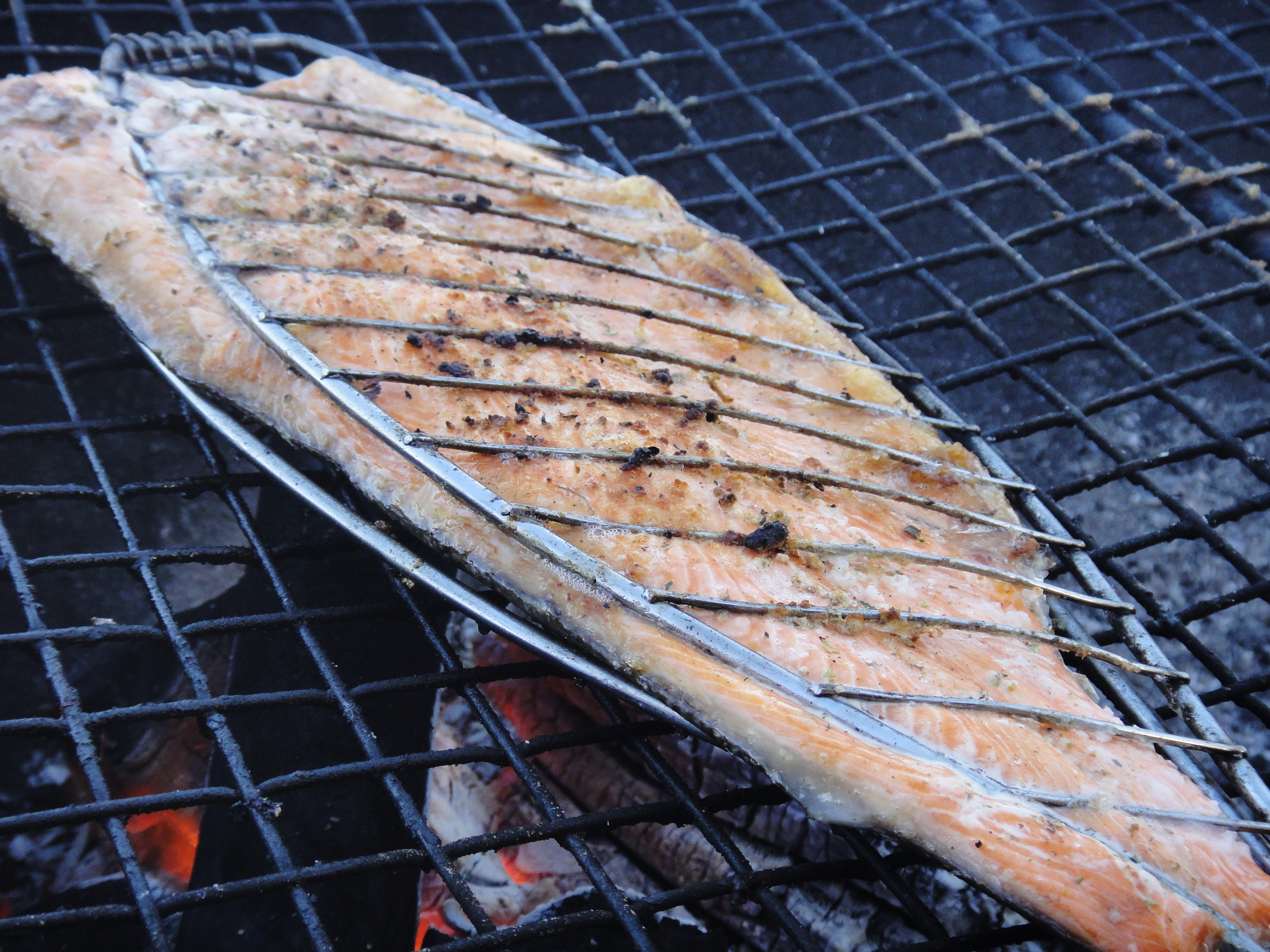
Grilling salmon

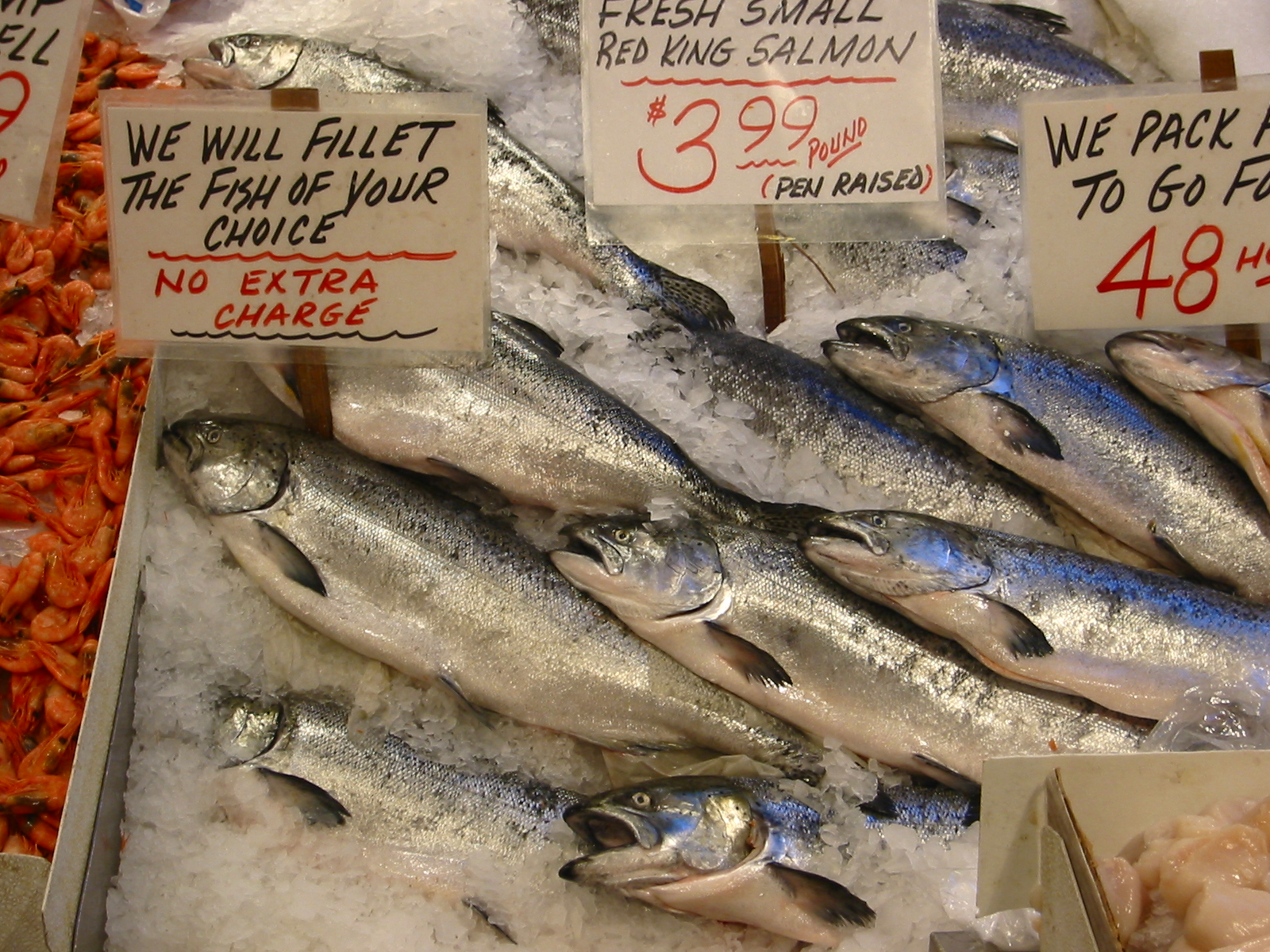
Salmon for sale

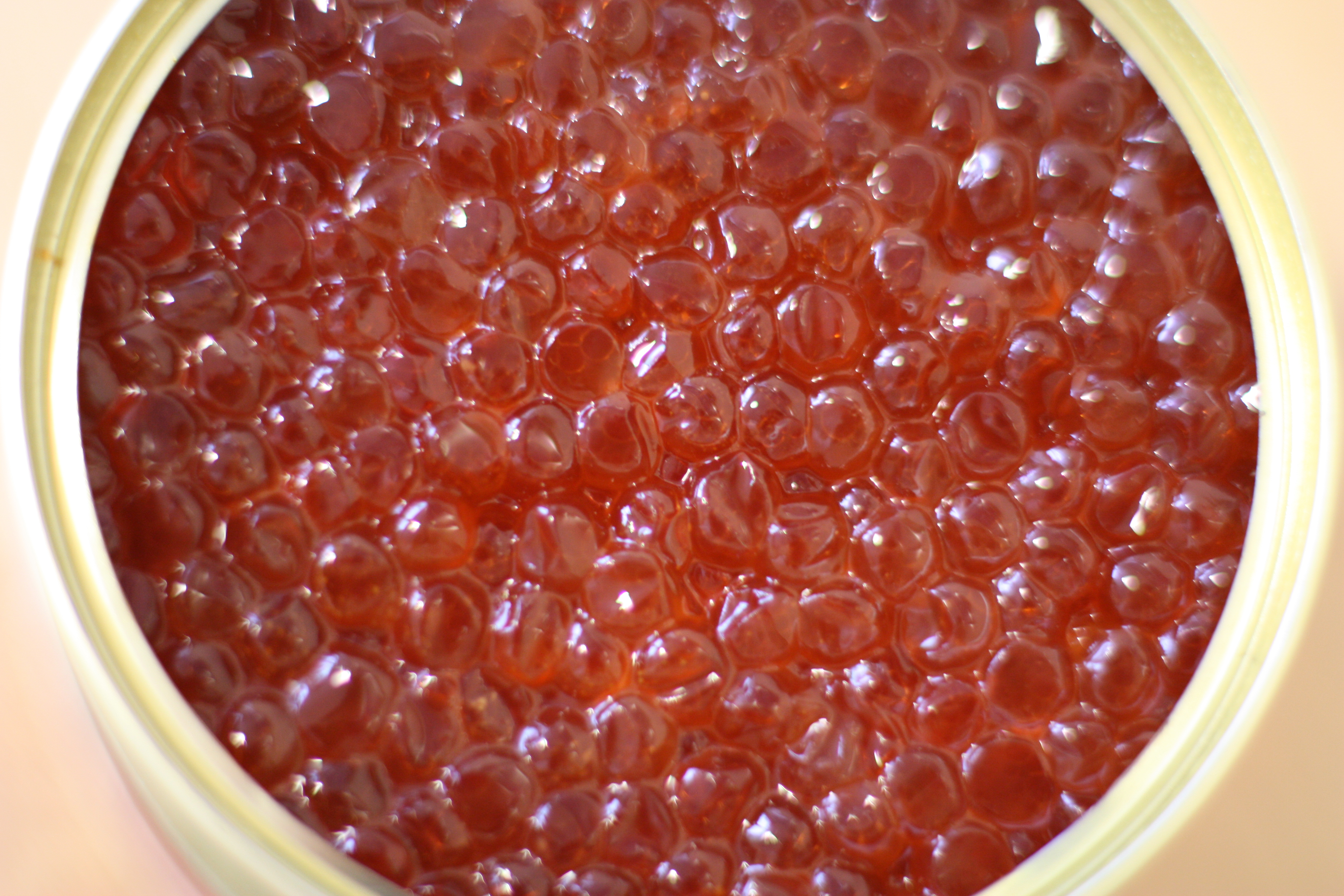
Salmon roe, sometimes called red caviar

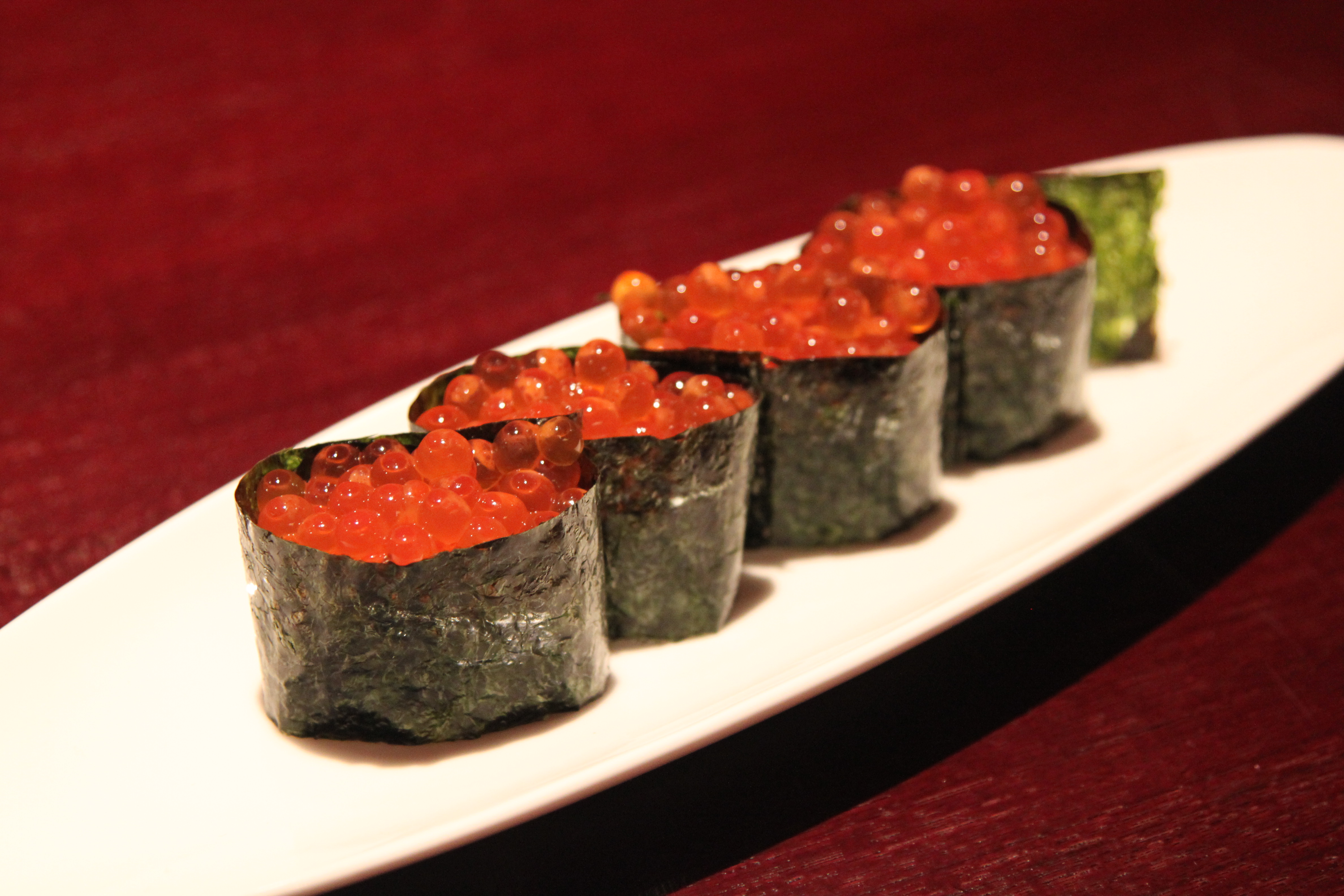
Salmon roe sushi

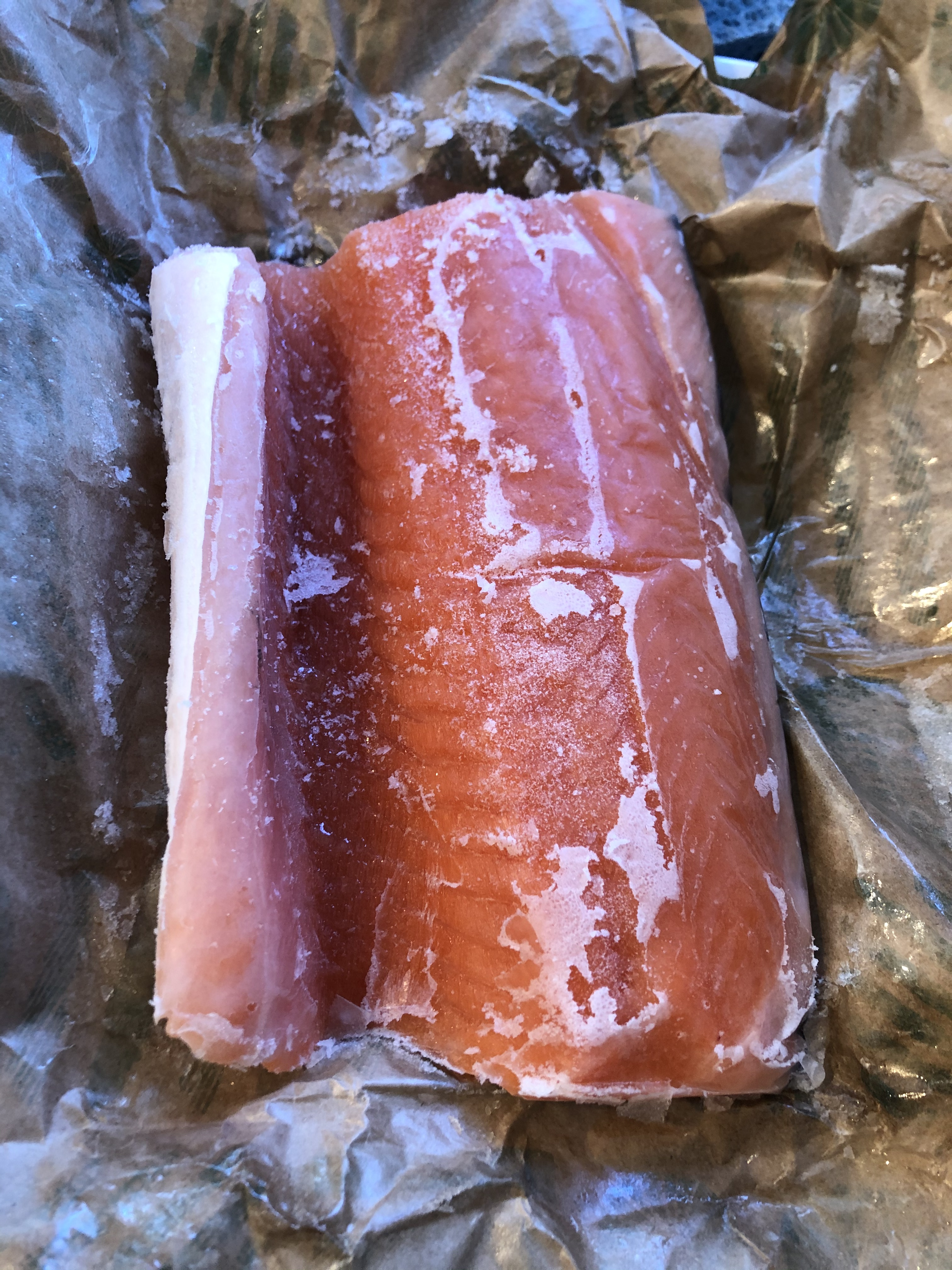
Approximately 1.80 lbs or 0.8 kilograms of frozen, farm raised, Atlantic salmon fillet

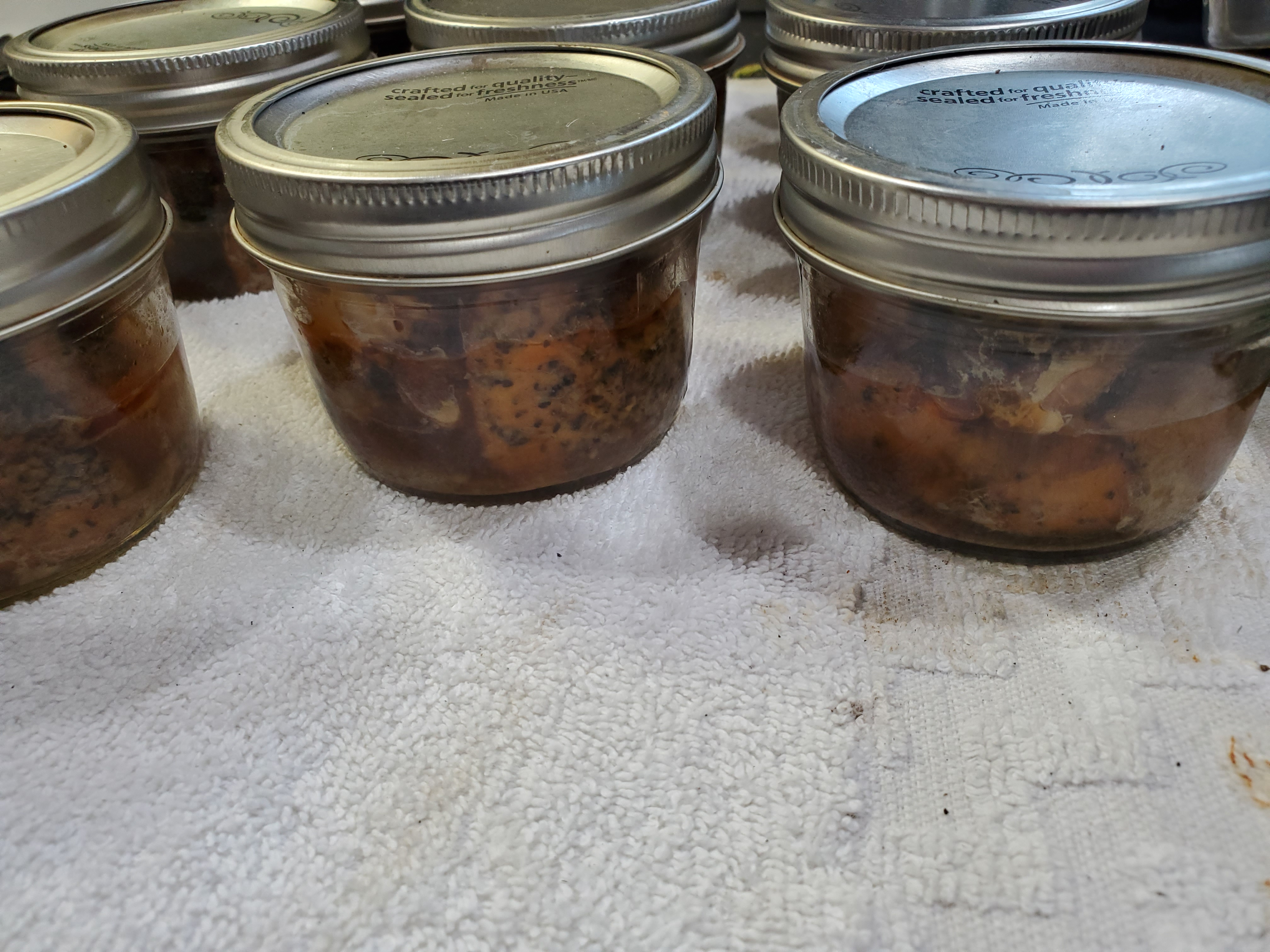
Home-canned smoked Pacific salmon

== See also ==
- Salmon cannery
- Atlantic salmon
- Chum salmon
- Dishwasher salmon
