= P. traversii =

P. traversii may refer to a two different species of shrub. The specific epithet traversii refers to someone with the surname 'Travers,' in these cases it's New Zealand naturalist Henry H. Travers (1844–1928).

- Pimelea traversii, a shrub in the family Thymelaeaceae
- †Plesiosaurus traversii, a marine reptile in the family Plesiosauridae
- Pseudowintera traversii, or Travers horopito, a shrub in the family Winteraceae
