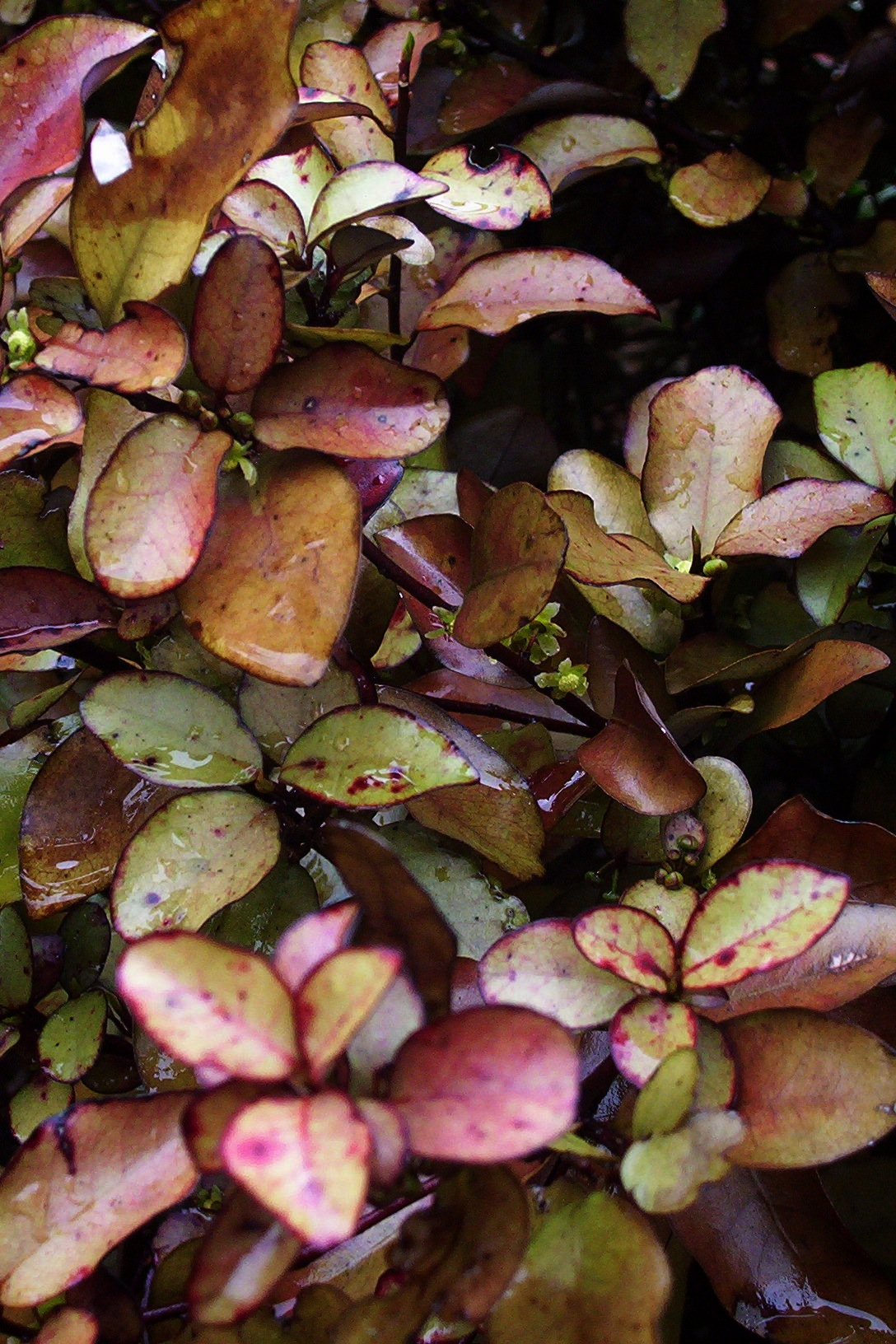
- Pseudowintera colorata

Scientific classification
- Kingdom: Plantae
- Clade: Tracheophytes
- Clade: Angiosperms
- Clade: Magnoliids
- Order: Canellales
- Family: Winteraceae
- Genus: Pseudowintera; Dandy

Species
- Pseudowintera axillaris (J.R.Forst. & G.Forst.) Dandy; Pseudowintera colorata (Raoul) Dandy; Pseudowintera insperata Heenan & de Lange; Pseudowintera traversii (Buchanan) Dandy

Synonyms
- Wintera G.Forst. ex Tiegh.

= Pseudowintera =

Genus of trees

Pseudowintera, commonly known as horopito, is a genus of woody evergreen flowering trees and shrubs, part of family Winteraceae. The species of Pseudowintera are native to New Zealand. Winteraceae are magnoliids, associated with the humid Antarctic flora of the southern hemisphere. Horopito can be chewed for a hot, peppery taste.

== Species ==
- Pseudowintera axillaris, is known as the lowland horopito. It is a shrub or small tree growing up to eight metres tall in lowland and lower montane forests from 35° to 42° South. In the South Island it grows West of the Main Divide.
- Pseudowintera colorata, or mountain horopito, is an evergreen shrub or small tree (1–2.5 m) commonly called pepperwood because its leaves have a very hot bite. Its yellow and green leaves are blotched with red; new leaves in the spring are bright red. It is widespread throughout New Zealand, from lowland forests to higher montane forests, and from 36° 30' South as far southwards as Stewart Island / Rakiura. Because of its various uses, both medicinal and culinary, the name horopito when used in common speech normally refers to the colorata species.
- Pseudowintera insperata, a rare species first identified in 2006, found in the Northland Region.
- Pseudowintera traversii, or Travers horopito, is a compact shrub up to one metre tall. It grows naturally only in the northwest corner of the South Island, from Collingwood to Westport.

== Cultivation ==
Horopito spreads naturally through regrowth on cleared land but may often be found in domestic gardens as a decorative plant. Planting for commercial purposes has begun in recent years.

== Pharmaceutical use ==
Horopito contains a substance called sesquiterpene dialdehyde polygodiali, otherwise known as polygodial that has a number of biological properties including antifungal, antimicrobial, anti-inflammatory, antiallergic and insecticide effects. Polygodial has been tested as a very effective inhibitor of Candida albicans. Horopito was used traditionally by Maori for a variety of medicinal purposes including treatment of: fungal skin infection, stomach pain, diarrhoea and as an analgesic. Early European settlers to New Zealand also used horopito for medicinal purposes.

== Use and history ==
Pseudowintera is one of the major plants used in traditional Māori medicine. The name horopito appears to be unique to Māori language, as there is no evidence of its use in other Polynesian languages to describe similar plants.

Pseudowintera is known to be a deterrent against introduced deer, who refuse to consume the plant. Because of this, Pseudowintera has grown to dominate the understory of some forested areas of New Zealand. The unrelated species Alseuosmia pusilla which has a similar appearance to Pseudowintera may have undergone Batesian mimicry in response to predation pressures, either from deer or earlier hypothesised predation by moa species.

Pseudowintera colorata is the most commonly used species for culinary use, which produces a numbing spiciness when the leaves are chewed. Horopito leaves are typically dried and then ground to form a powder. The powder may be used wherever black pepper is used and applied directly to meats, mixed with oils, used to make condiments (e.g. with mustard), in vinegars, biscuits, and as flavouring for beer and ice-cream.
