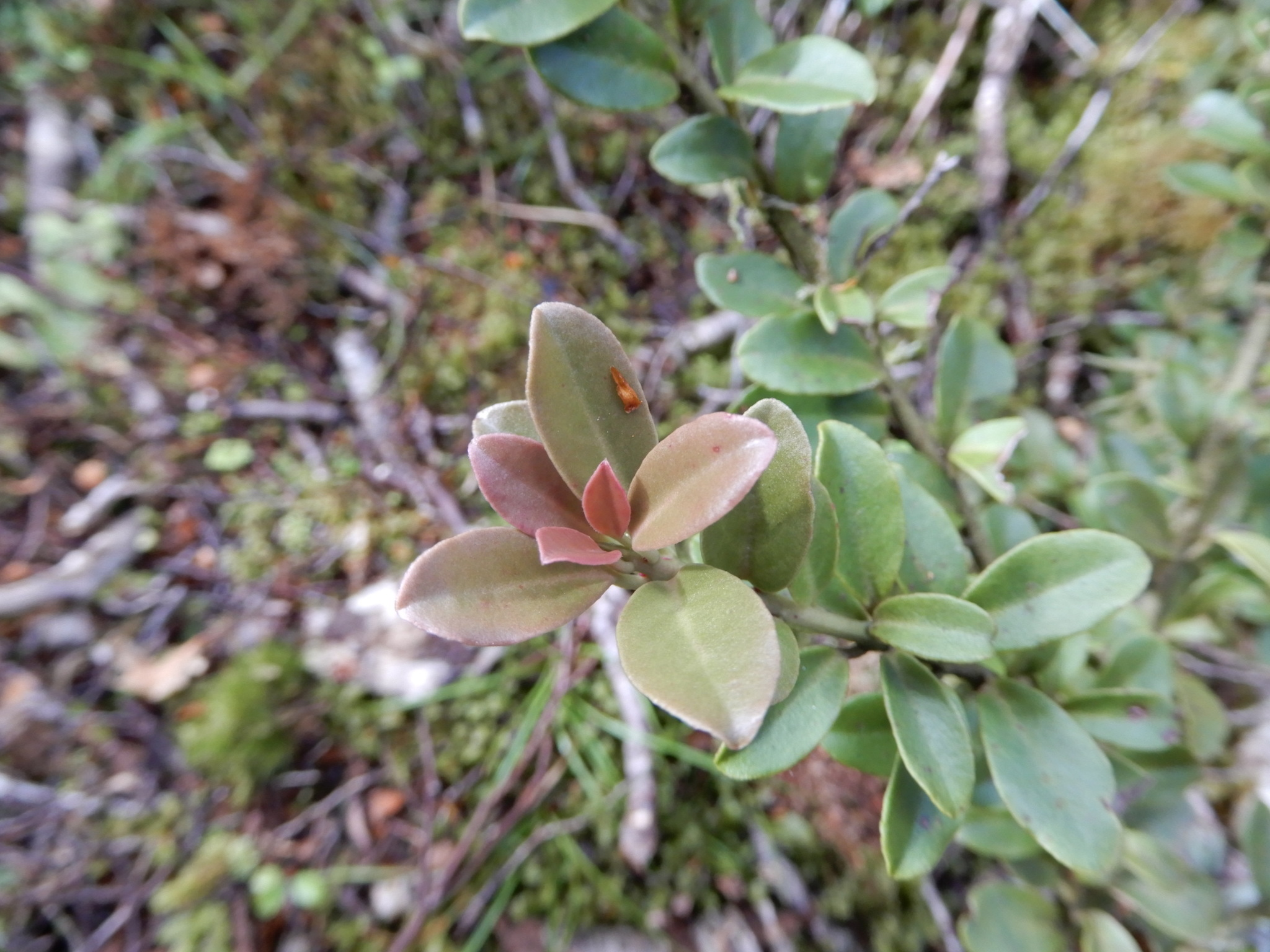
- Pseudowintera traversii
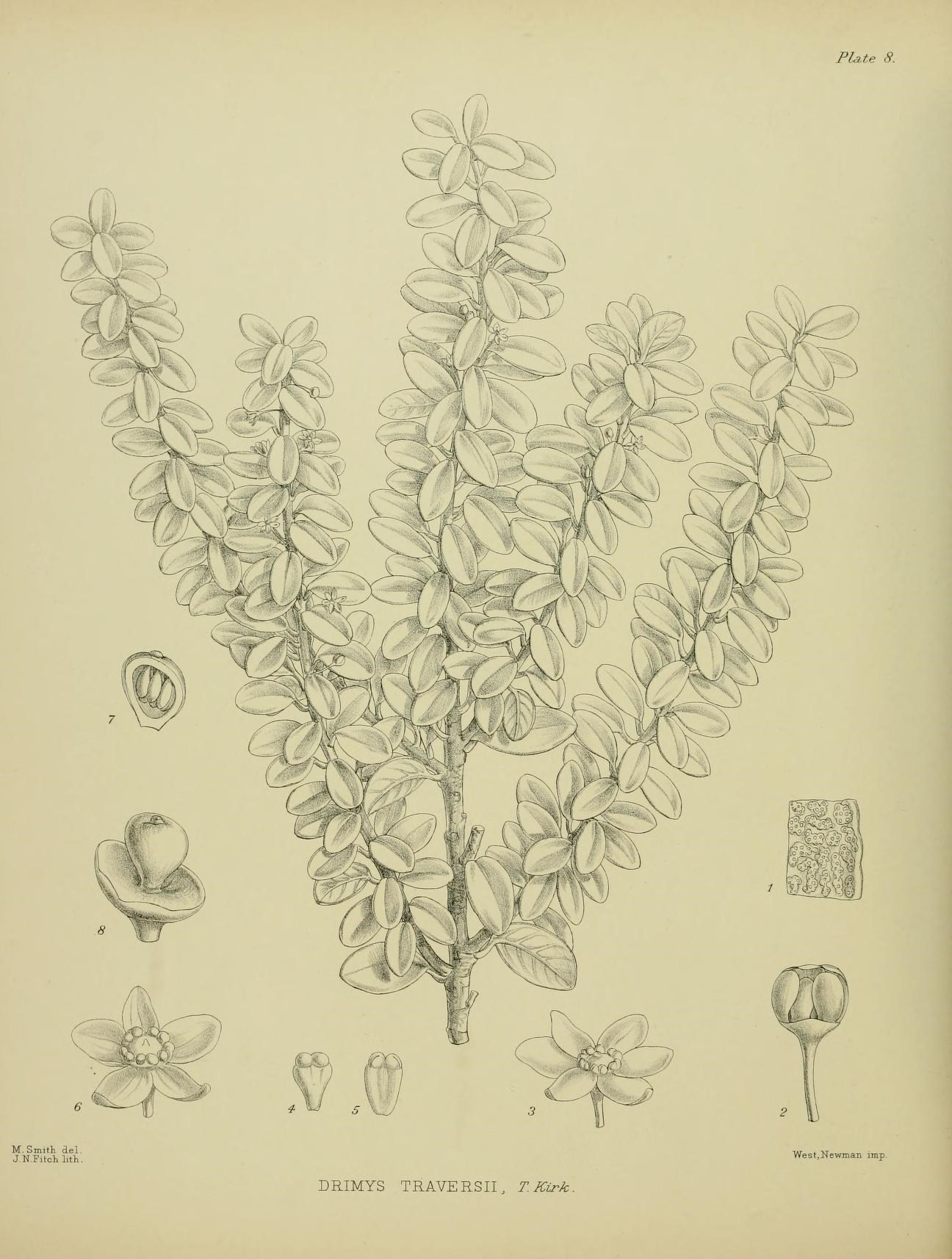
- illustration of Pseudowintera traversii

Conservation status
- Least Concern (IUCN 3.1)

- Naturally Uncommon (NZ TCS)

Scientific classification
- Kingdom: Plantae
- Clade: Embryophytes
- Clade: Tracheophytes
- Clade: Spermatophytes
- Clade: Angiosperms
- Clade: Magnoliids
- Order: Canellales
- Family: Winteraceae
- Genus: Pseudowintera
- Species: P. traversii

Binomial name
- Pseudowintera traversii (Buchanan) Dandy (1933)

Synonyms
- Drimys traversii T. Kirk 1898; Hymenanthera traversii Buchanan (1882 [1883]); Wintera monogyna Tiegh. 1900; Wintera traversii (Buchanan) Cockayne

= Pseudowintera traversii =

Species of flowering plant

Pseudowintera traversii, sometimes called Travers horopito, is a species of woody shrub in the family Winteraceae. The specific epithet traversii is in honor of naturalist Henry H. Travers (1844–1928), son of William Thomas Locke Travers.

== Description ==
Pseudowintera traversii is a densely branched shrub growing up to 2 metres (6 ft 7 in) high. It has coriaceous leaves that are 2–2.5 centimetres (0.79–0.98 in) long and ovate or obovate. The leaves are green-blue underneath and matte green on top, close-set and on stout petioles. The leaves may have reddish margins, but lack the picturesque blotches of P. colorata. However they are described as tasting peppery and pungent. The bark is reddish-brown and rough. The green or yellow flowers appear in January, growing singly or as doubles, or rarely triples, with 5–7 petals and 4–9 stamens. The fruit appears in February as a fleshy berry, that is purplish-black and 2–3 millimetres (0.079–0.118 in) in diameter, containing 3–6 seeds.

Like all species in the family Winteraceae, P. traversii lacks vessels in its xylem.

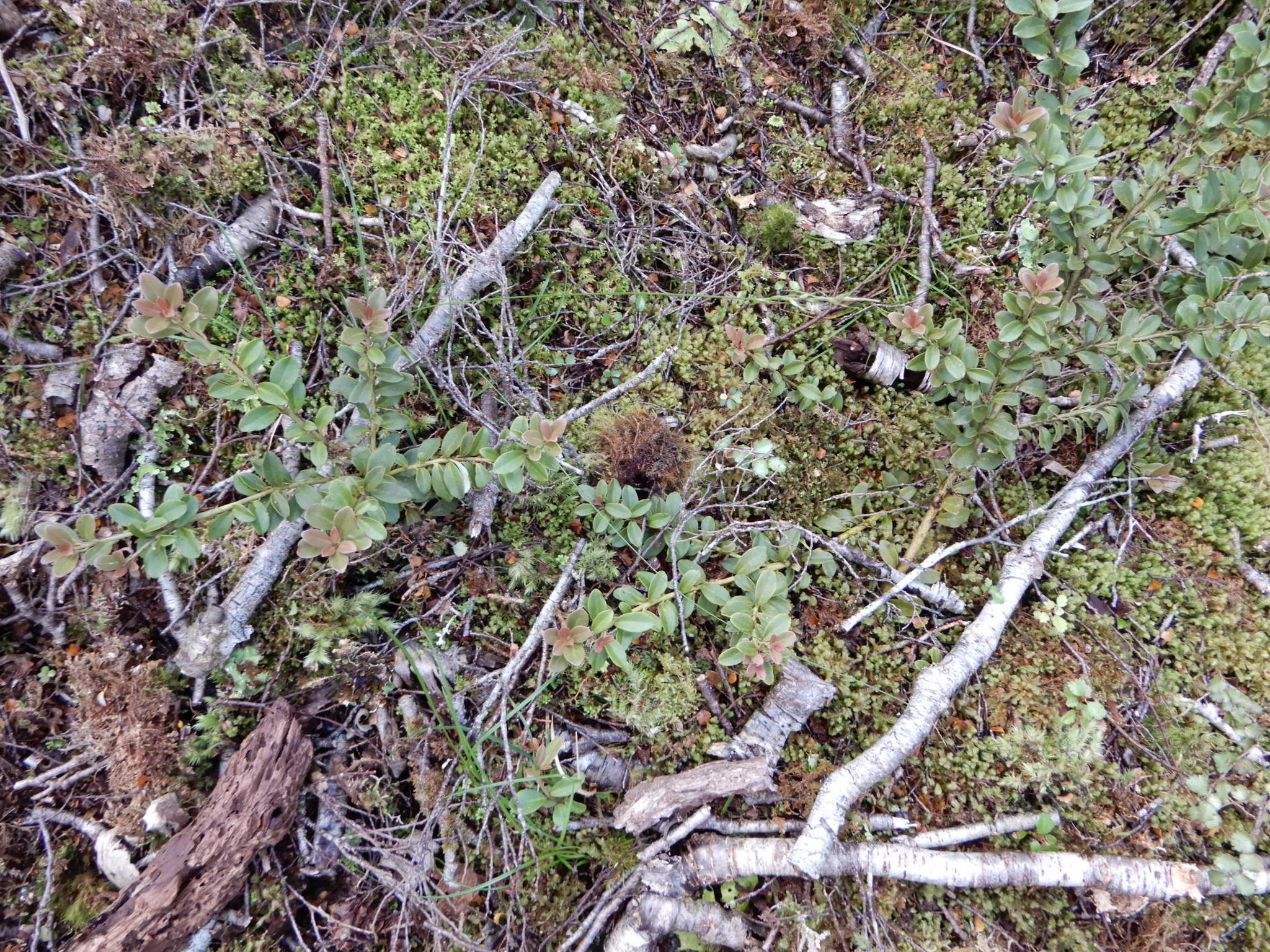
Growth habit

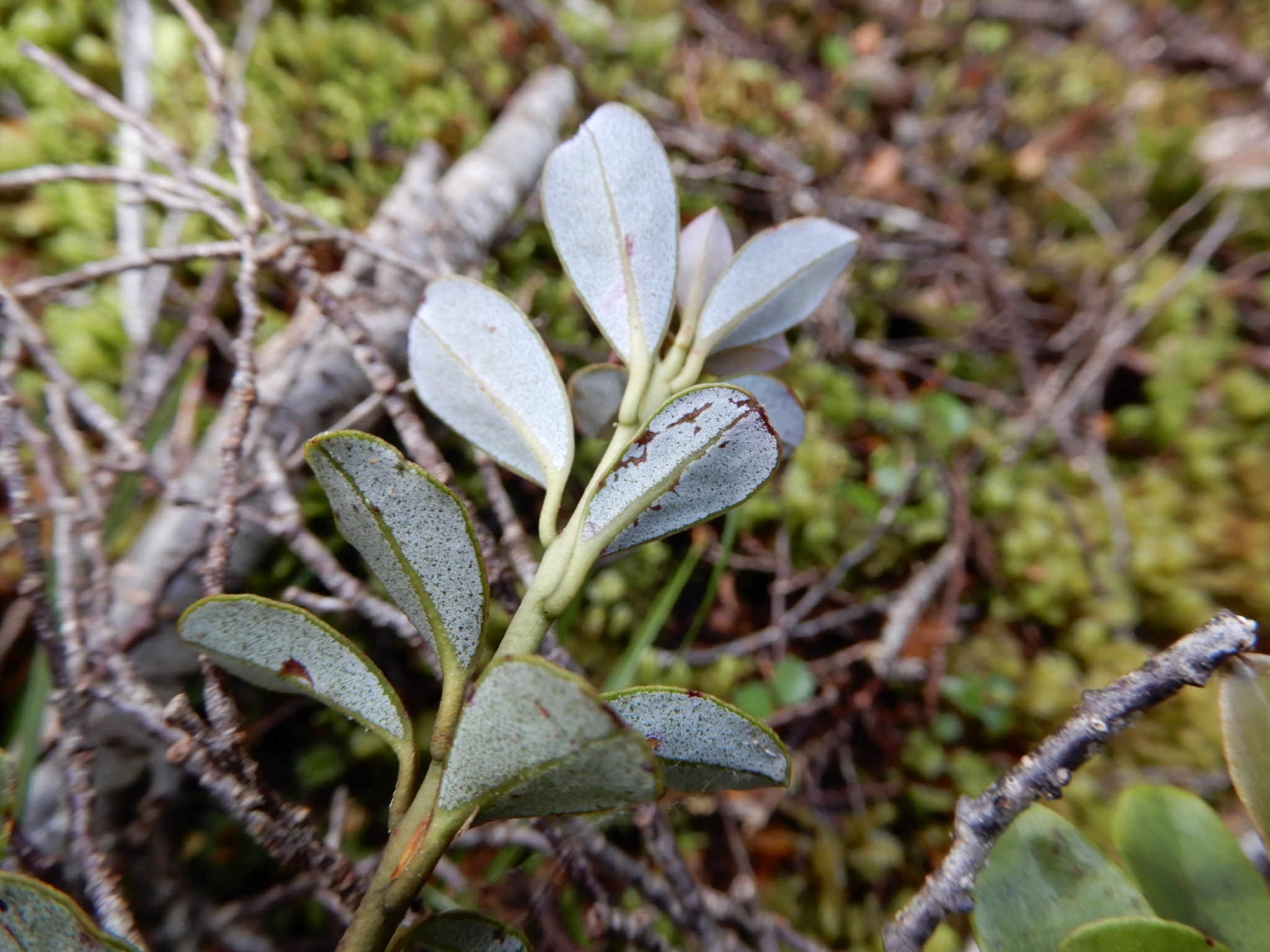
Underside of leaves

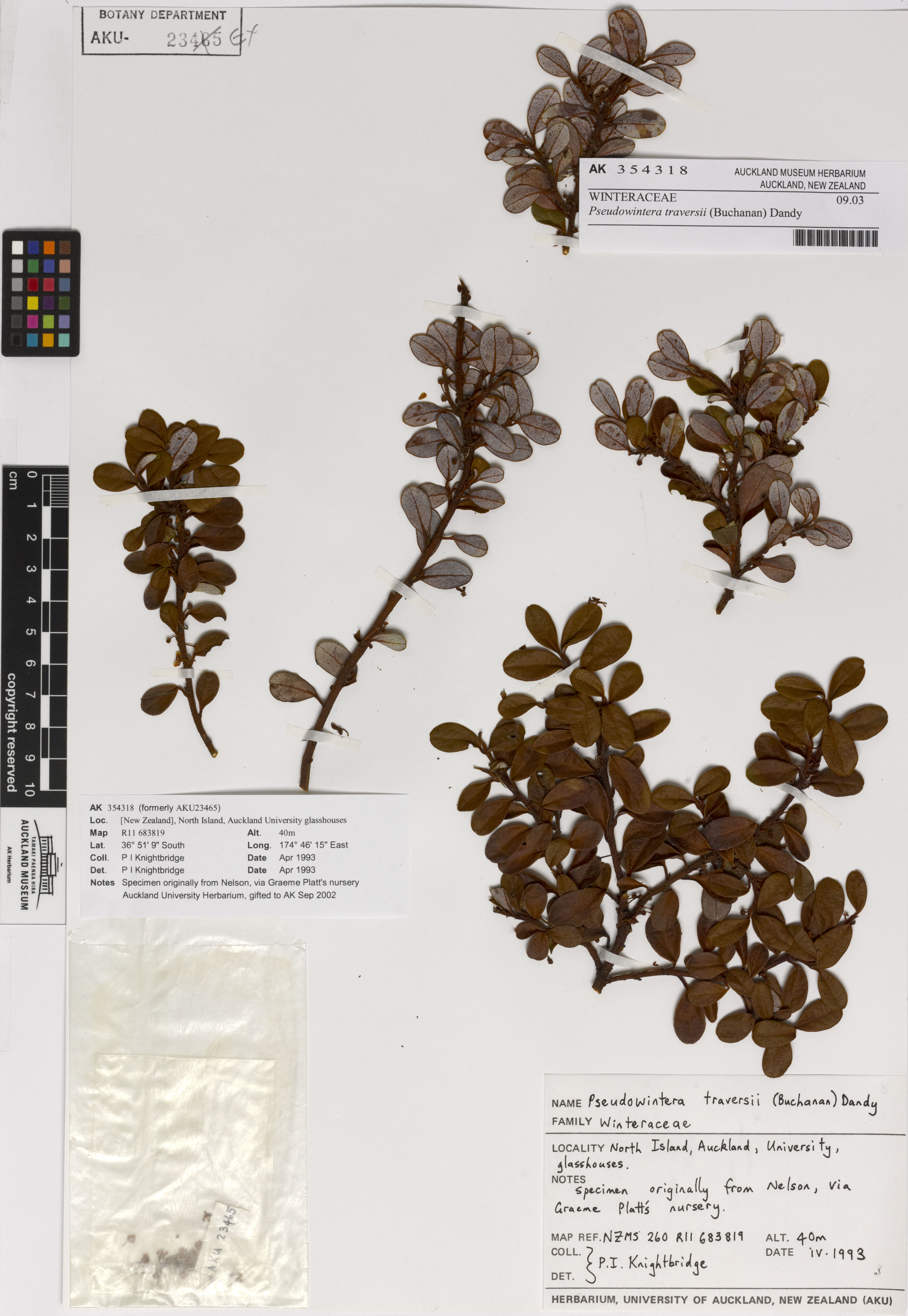
A specimen from the Auckland War Memorial Museum

Genomic information
- Ploidy: haploid
- Number of chromosomes: 43

== Habitat ==
Like the other species of horopito in Pseudowintera, it is endemic to New Zealand. It is the rarest of the species, and the national government there lists it as "At Risk - Naturally Uncommon." Naturally, it only is found growing in montane shrubland and woodland edges in the South Island in northwest Nelson between Westport and Collingwood. It grows from 600–1,300 metres (2,000–4,300 ft) in elevation.

== Ecology ==
Pseudowintera traversii shares a pollinator (possibly a thrips) with P. colorata, as natural hybrids have been found where their ranges overlap. Females of the species Thrips obscuratus (New Zealand flower thrips) have been collected on P. traversii.
