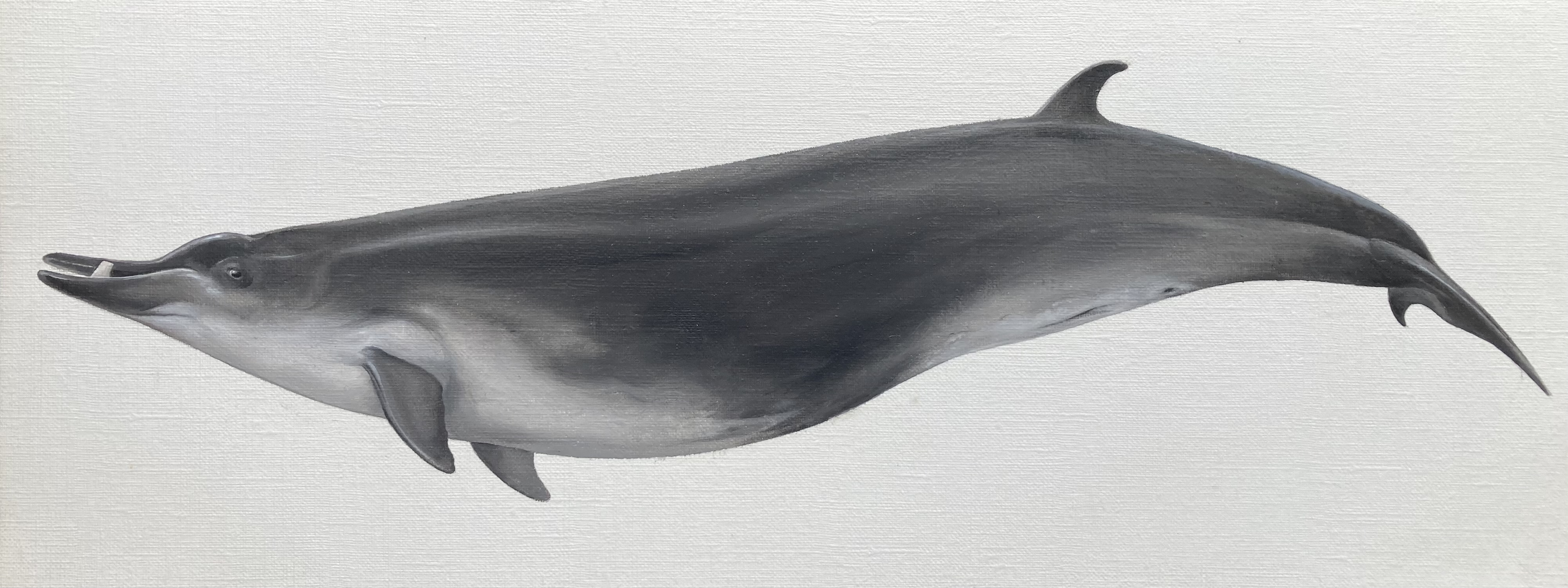
- Painting of male
- Size compared to an average human

Conservation status
- Data Deficient (IUCN 3.1)
- CITES Appendix II

Scientific classification
- Kingdom: Animalia
- Phylum: Chordata
- Class: Mammalia
- Order: Artiodactyla
- Infraorder: Cetacea
- Family: Ziphiidae
- Genus: Mesoplodon
- Species: M. traversii

Binomial name
- Mesoplodon traversii (Gray, 1874)
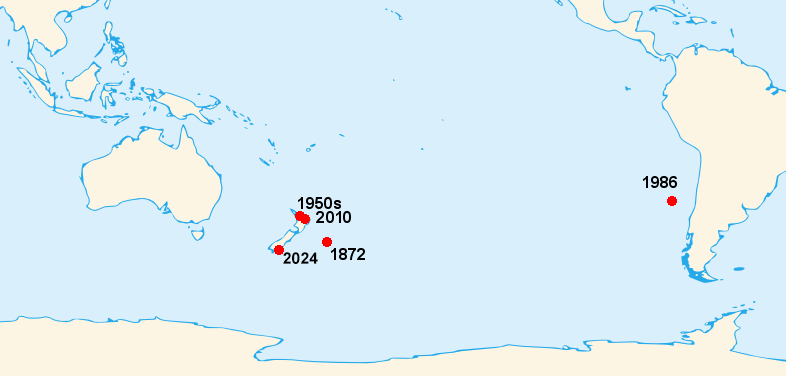
- Locations and dates of specimens

Synonyms
- Dolichodon traversii Gray, 1874; Mesoplodon bahamondi Reyes, Van Waerebeek, Cárdenas and Yáñez, 1995

= Spade-toothed whale =

Species of beaked whale

The spade-toothed whale (Mesoplodon traversii) is the rarest species of beaked whale. Only seven confirmed specimens have ever been found, over the timespan from 1872 to 2024. All seven were found in the South Pacific—six in New Zealand and one in Chile. Very little is known about the species.

== Discovery ==
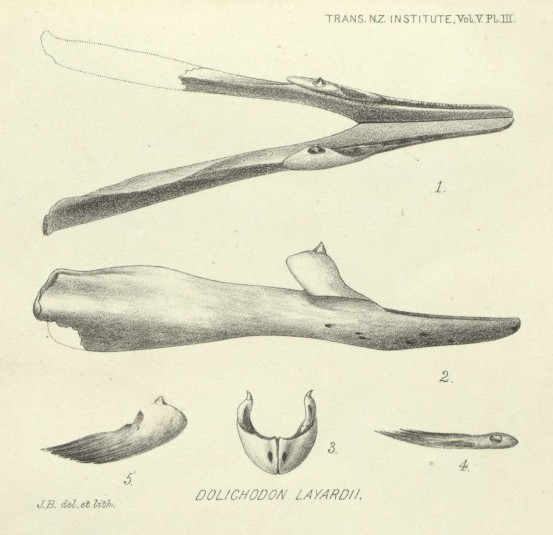
Lower jaw found on Pitt Island in 1872. Illustration by "J.B." (John Buchanan) published in Hector 1873

The whale was discovered from a lower jaw with teeth found by naturalist Henry Travers on Pitt Island in the Chatham Islands of New Zealand in 1872. James Hector, the director of the Colonial Museum, reported the jaw in an 1873 paper on the whales and dolphins of New Zealand, thinking it a specimen of strap-toothed whale (Dolichodon layardii), which had been described by British Museum zoologist John Edward Gray in 1865 from a South African specimen. Gray, in an 1874 response, doubted Hector's identification and thought the jaw likely from a new species, which he provisionally named Dolichodon traversii in honor of Travers, the collector. Hector was not persuaded though and insisted in an 1878 article that it was the jaw of a strap-toothed whale, which by then had been renamed Mesoplodon layardi.

A damaged calvaria (the top of the skull) was found washed up on Robinson Crusoe Island, Chile, in 1993 and was described as a new species, Mesoplodon bahamondi or Bahamonde's beaked whale. A calvaria found at White Island in New Zealand in the 1950s went unidentified for about 40 years, until in 1999 it was identified as being from a ginkgo-toothed beaked whale (Mesoplodon ginkgodens). According to a 2002 study, DNA sequence and morphological comparisons show that the first three finds all came from the same species, which is therefore properly known as M. traversii.

In December 2010, a 5.3-metre (17 ft) cow and 3.5-metre (11 ft) male calf stranded, then died, on Opape Beach, eastern Bay of Plenty, New Zealand. At the time they were thought to be Gray's beaked whale (Mesoplodon grayi), and were buried at the beach after photographs, measurements and tissue samples were taken. Genetic analysis in 2011 revealed that they were spade-toothed whales, the first whole individuals known to have been seen. The skeletons were exhumed, without the female's skull, which had washed out to sea, and were taken to Te Papa, New Zealand's national museum. The first ever description of the external appearance of the whale, along with an analysis of DNA, was published in 2012.

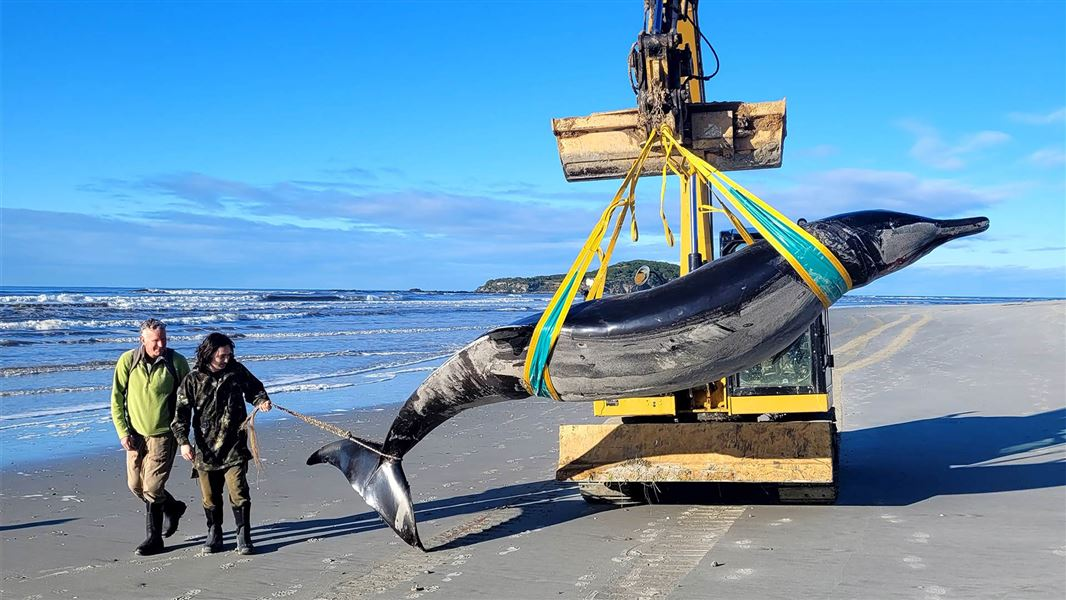
The beached male of the species named Ōnumia found in New Zealand in 2024

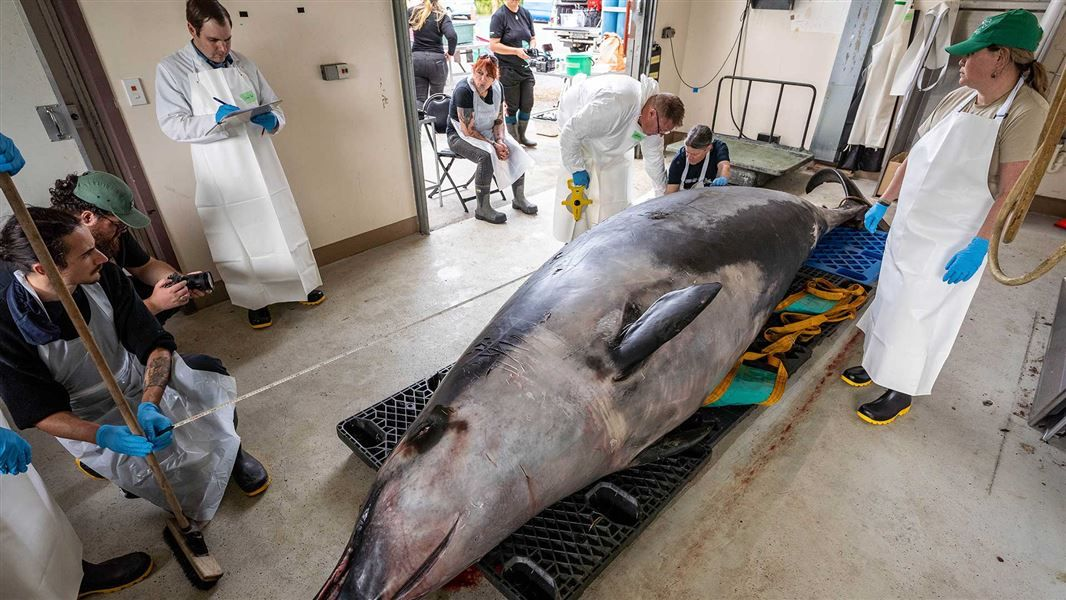
The beached male Ōnumia before dissection

On 4 July 2024, a dead 5-metre (16 ft) male blackish-silver specimen washed ashore near Taieri Mouth, on the southern east coast of the South Island, New Zealand. Samples from the intact specimen were taken by the Department of Conservation and sent to the University of Auckland's Cetacean Tissue Archive for DNA testing. The specimen was brought to the Invermay Agricultural Centre in Mosgiel for dissection, which began on 2 December. This was the first intact specimen able to be dissected. The skeleton will be the first of this species on display in a museum. The individual was named Ōnumia by Te Rūnanga o Ōtākou, after the Māori name for the area where he was found.

== Description ==
Until 2012, nothing was known about this species other than cranial and dental anatomy. Some differences exist between it and other mesoplodonts, such as the relatively large width of the rostrum. Its appearance might be most similar to an oversized ginkgo-toothed beaked whale in overall shape, as their skulls are quite alike except in size. The distinguishing characters are the very large teeth, 23 cm (9 in), close in size to those of the strap-toothed whale. The teeth are much wider than those of the strap-toothed, and a peculiar denticle on the tip of the teeth present on both species is much more pronounced in the spade-toothed whale. It is believed that only the males obtain the jutted denticle and that it smoothens over time due to aggressive behavior with other males. The common name was chosen because the part of the tooth that protrudes from the gums (unlike the strap-like teeth of strap-toothed whales) has a shape similar to the tip of a flensing spade as used by 19th-century whalers.

Despite the rather similar dentition, the spade-toothed whale and strap-toothed whale seem to be only distantly related. The present species' relationships are not known with certainty, though, because this species is very distinct morphologically, and the DNA sequence information is contradictory and is currently not good enough to support a robust phylogenetic hypothesis. Judging from the size of the skull, the species was thought to be between 5.0 and 5.5 m (16.4 and 18.0 ft) in length, perhaps a bit larger. The first (2010) known complete specimens are a 5.3-m (17.4-ft) adult female and her 3.5-m (11.5-ft) male calf. The cow was spindle-shaped, with a triangular dorsal fin with a concave trailing edge set about two-thirds the way back. It was dark gray or black dorsally and white ventrally, with a light thoracic patch created by a diagonal band that extends from behind the eye downwards and back to the dorsal fin. It also has a dark eye patch, rostrum, and flippers.

Dissection of the specimen found in 2024 revealed that the species has nine stomach chambers. Stomach contents included squid beaks and lenses, and parasitic worms.

== Behaviour and ecology ==
It is likely the most poorly known large mammal species of modern times. It has never been seen alive, so nothing is known of its behavior. It is presumably similar to other medium-sized Mesoplodon, which are typically deep-water species living alone or in small groups and feeding on cephalopods and small fish. Following a year-long gestation period, the young probably become independent of their mothers at about one year of age, as is the case in most whales, with roughly a 73% chance of survival past year one.

It is assumed that the remaining population lives solely in the Southern Hemisphere, and possibly only in the South Pacific.

== Conservation ==
The population status of the spade-toothed whale is entirely unknown.

The spade-toothed whale is covered by the Memorandum of Understanding for the Conservation of Cetaceans and Their Habitats in the Pacific Islands Region (Pacific Cetaceans MOU). The species' IUCN Red List conservation status is "Data Deficient (DD)" due to lack of information and uncertain data.

== Specimens ==
- NMNZ 546 – 1872; Pitt Island specimen, apparently male, probably fully adult
- University of Auckland School of Biological Sciences MacGregor Collection (unnumbered) – 1950s White Island specimen, probably fully adult
- Chilean National Museum of Natural History 1156 – 1986; Robinson Crusoe Island specimen, probably fully adult
- University of Auckland School of Biological Sciences MacGregor Collection 2010; Opape Beach specimen, adult female with male calf.
- Ōnumia – male individual recovered by Department of Conservation on 4 July 2024 from a beach near Taieri Mouth in Otago; genetic samples have been sent to the University of Auckland for testing, with this specimen being the most intact ever found and offering the first chance for dissection of a specimen.

The sex of the two 20th-century specimens is unknown. The sex could in theory be determined by recovering or failing to recover DNA sequences of the Y chromosome.

== See also ==
- List of cetaceans
