= Moore's Bush Reserve =

Reserve in Leith Valley, New Zealand

Coordinates: 45°49′8.77″S 170°30′40.45″E

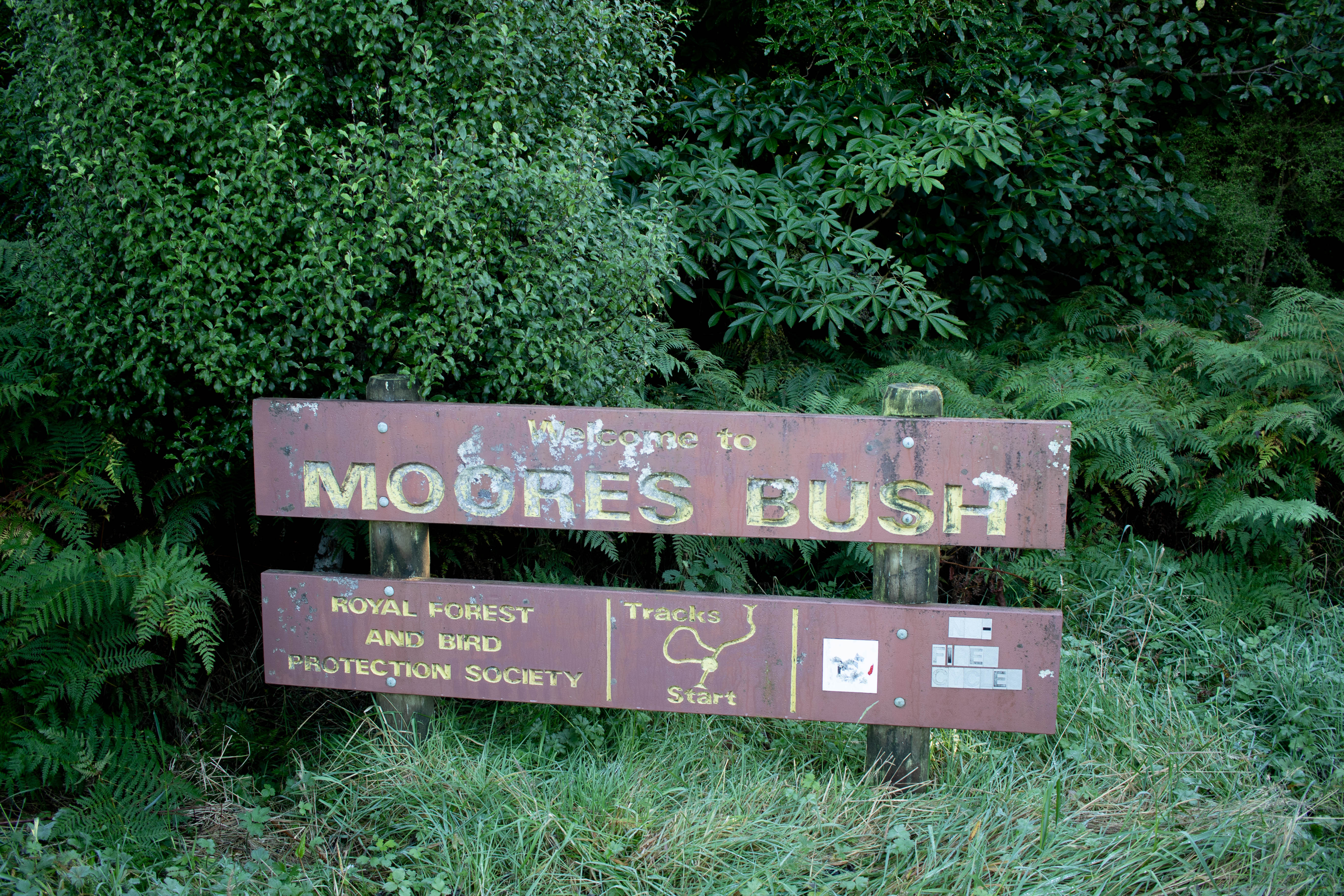
A sign at the entrance to Moore's Bush Reserve.

Moore's Bush Reserve, also known as Moore's Bush, is a small reserve in the suburb of Leith Valley in Dunedin, New Zealand.

This 4-hectare reserve is a combination of remnant native forest and a former dairy farm that has been replanted with native species.

A number of small streams, including the Leith, run through the reserve.

== History ==
Moore's Bush was purchased by Percy and Ellie Moore in 1945 who began restoring the open farmland to its natural state by planting native podocarp conifers and broad-leaved hardwood trees. Moore's Bush was bequeathed to the Dunedin branch of Forest & Bird by the Moore family in 1974 after Percy Moore died. An additional 2 hectares of forest owned by the Department of Conservation was added to Moore's Bush for the branch to manage in the 1990s.

== Flora and fauna ==
Native bird species present at Moore's Bush include tūī, bellbird, grey warbler (grey warbler), kererū (wood pigeon) fantail, tomtit, pīpipi (brown creepers), and pīpīwharauroa (shining cuckoo).

Common plants include tarata, miro, rimu, māhoe (whiteywood), horopito (pepper tree), kōtukutuku (tree fuchsia), pōkākā, tōtara, kahikatea, pāhautea (New Zealand cedar), makomako (wineberry), mataī, pittosporums, coprosmas, and broadleaf trees.

Freshwater species include kōura (freshwater crayfish) and tuna (eels).

== Conservation ==
Moore's Bush is currently owned and managed by the Dunedin branch of Forest & Bird who are working to restore the forest through native tree plantings, pest control, and the removal of invasive weed species including blackberry and broom.
