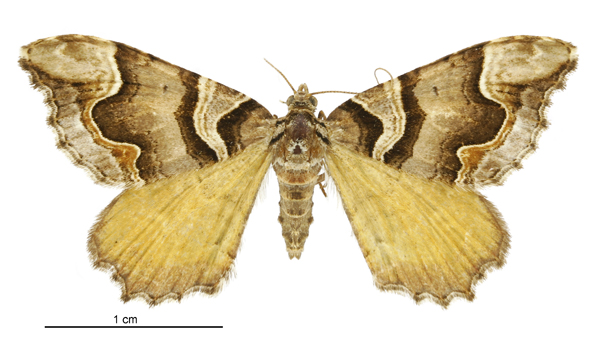
- Female
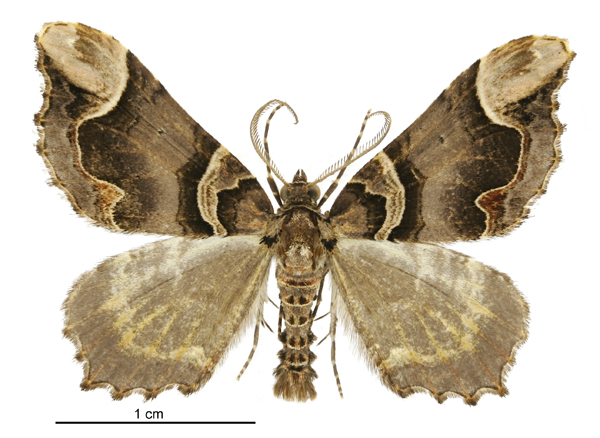
- Male

Scientific classification
- Kingdom: Animalia
- Phylum: Arthropoda
- Clade: Pancrustacea
- Class: Insecta
- Order: Lepidoptera
- Family: Geometridae
- Genus: Asaphodes
- Species: A. chlamydota

Binomial name
- Asaphodes chlamydota (Meyrick, 1883)

Synonyms
- Epyaxa chlamydota Meyrick, 1883; Xanthorhoe chlamydota (Meyrick, 1883); Larentia chlamydota (Meyrick, 1883)

= Asaphodes chlamydota =

Elegant carpet moth

Species of moth endemic to New Zealand

Asaphodes chlamydota (also known as the elegant carpet moth) is a moth in the family Geometridae. It is endemic to New Zealand, and can be found in the lower part of the North Island and in the South Island. It inhabits native forest and shrublands. The larvae of this species feeds on native Clematis plants including Clematis afoliata. Adults are on the wing from September to April and are regarded as having intermedia flight powers.

== Taxonomy ==
This species was first described by Edward Meyrick in 1883 as Epyaxa chlamydota. Later in 1884 Meyrick gave a more detailed description of the newly named species. George Hudson further discussed the species in his 1898 volume New Zealand Moths and Butterflies and referred to it as Xanthorhoe chlamydota. Hudson again discussed and illustrated this species in his 1928 book The butterflies and moths of New Zealand. In 1939 Louis Beethoven Prout placed this species in the genus Larentia. This placement was not accepted by New Zealand taxonomists. In 1971 John S. Dugdale assigned this species to the genus Asaphodes. Although Dugdale confirmed this placement in 1988 he mentions the possibility that this species might not fall within the genus Asaphodes. The male lectotype, collected at Akaroa, is held at the Canterbury Museum.

== Description ==
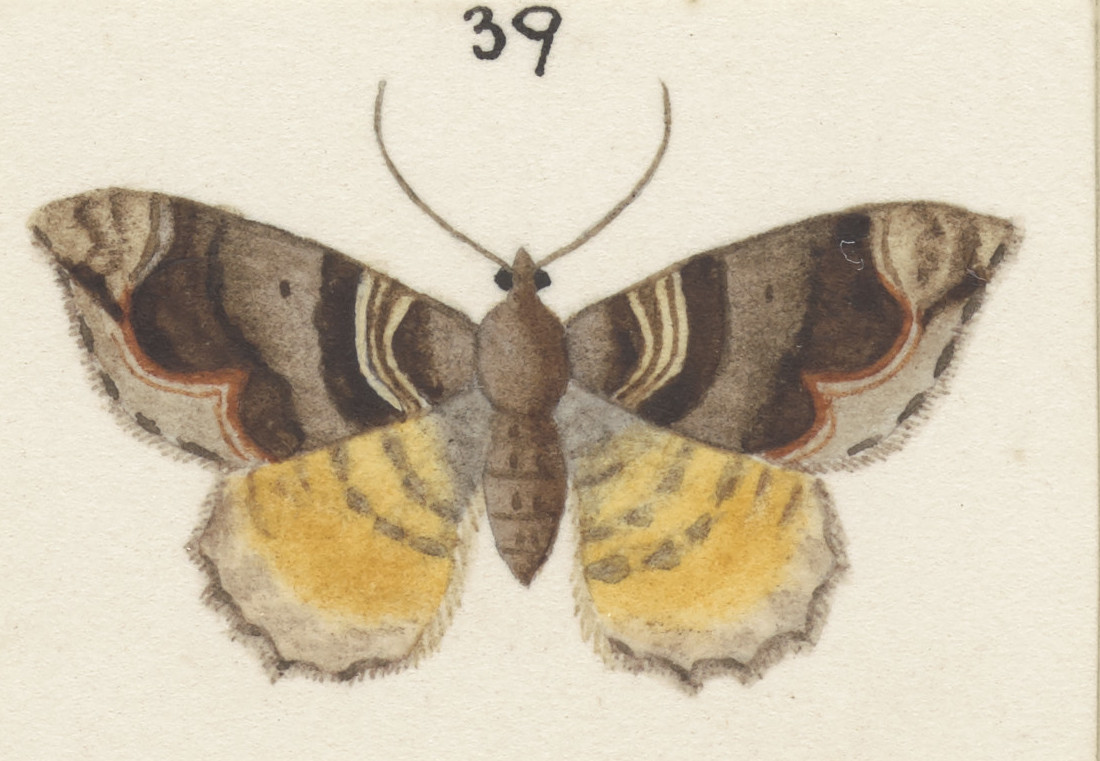
Illustration of a female A. chlamydota by George Hudson.

Hudson described the species as follows:

The expansion of the wings is about 1 1/4 inches. The fore-wings are pale ochreous; with two broad, dark, purplish-brown bands. The first, which is at the base, is slightly paler near the body, and strongly curved outwards towards the termen; it is followed by several very line pale brown transverse lines. The second band is broad, and is situated near the middle of the wing; its inner edge is curved inwards, and its outer edge has two rounded projections, one very large about the middle, and another much smaller near the dorsum; the middle portion of this central hand is considerably paler than the edges; the two projects of the central band are boarded with bright red. The upper part of the termen is ochreous, with several faint brown marks; the lower part is dull grey. The hind-wings are dark ochreous, with a few obscure purplish-grey markings; the termen of the hind-wing projects slightly near the middle, and is rather jagged.

This is a distinctive species and is easily recognised. There are slight differences in colouration between the North and South Island specimens with the hindwings of North Island examples having black markings on a base of light orange where as South Island examples lacking those black markings on the hindwings.

== Distribution ==
A. chlamydota is endemic to New Zealand. It can be found in the North and South Islands. Meyrick stated this species was present in Wellington, Christchurch and Akaroa, and Hudson mentioned the species is present in the Wellington Botanic Garden. Specimens of this species have been collected in the mid Canterbury. A. chlamydota was also found to be present in the Dansey ecological district in Otago.

== Habitat and host plants ==
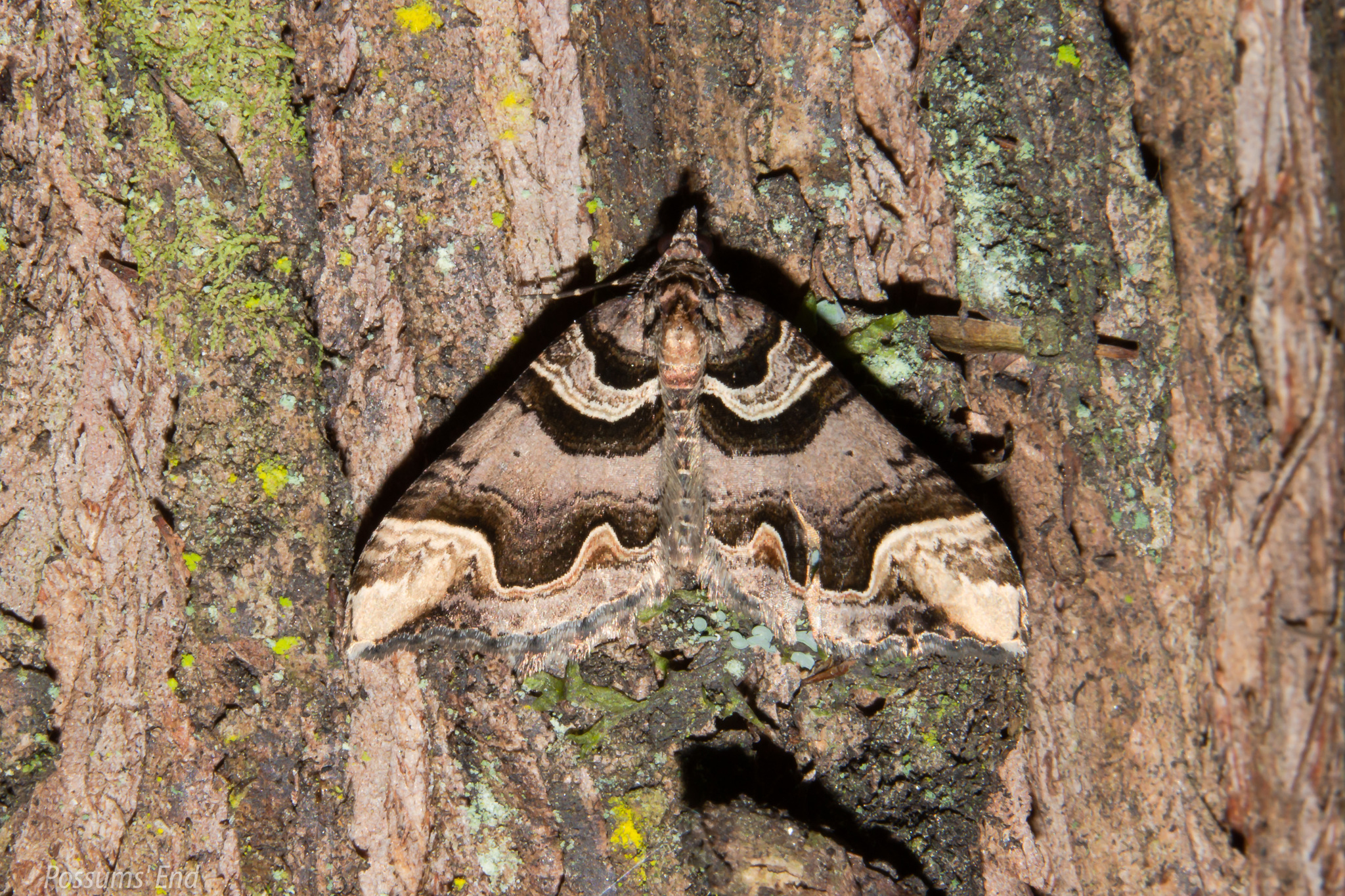
Observation of live A. chlamydota.

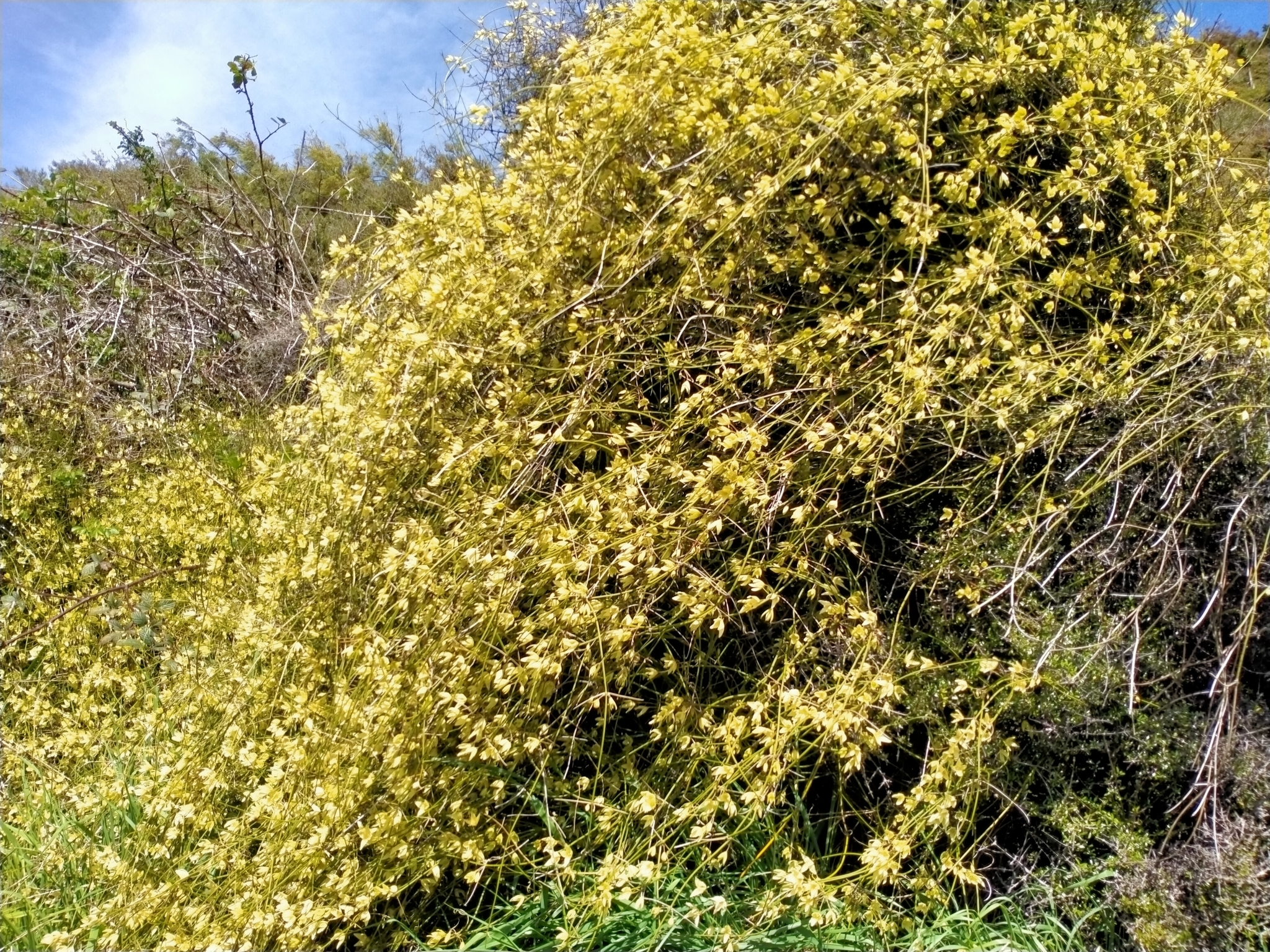
Clematis afoliata, larval host species.

The habitat of this species is amongst native forest as well as shrubland. It has been found at altitudes of below 500 m.

A. chlamydota larvae feed on plants within the genus Clematis including Clematis afoliata and Clematis marata.

== Behaviour ==
Adult A. chlamydota are present during the months of November to April. Specimens have also been collected in October and are said to be present in Otago from September. A. chlamyota adults are regarded as having intermediate flight powers and remain active during light breezes. They are attracted to light and have been collected via a mercury vapour light trap.
