= Clematis afoliata =

- Greenish-white flowers on downy pedicels

Scientific classification
- Kingdom: Plantae
- Clade: Tracheophytes
- Clade: Angiosperms
- Clade: Eudicots
- Order: Ranunculales
- Family: Ranunculaceae
- Genus: Clematis
- Species: C. afoliata

Binomial name
- Clematis afoliata Buchanan

Synonyms
- Clematis aphylla Colenso

Species of vine

Clematis afoliata is a species of flowering plant in the genus Clematis in the family Ranunculaceae. It is native to New Zealand,

== Description ==
Clematis afoliata is a woody evergreen climbing shrub. It is almost leafless, but when leaves are present, they each have three small leaflets. The stems are hairless, green, and lightly ridged. The flowers are about 2.5cm (1 inch) wide, fragrant, greenish-white, and borne on downy pedicels of 2.5-5cm (1-2 inches) in length. The flowers are held in axillary clusters, with around 2-6 flowers per cluster.

== Etymology ==
Clematis is derived from Greek and means 'climbing plant'.

Afoliata means "without leaves".
