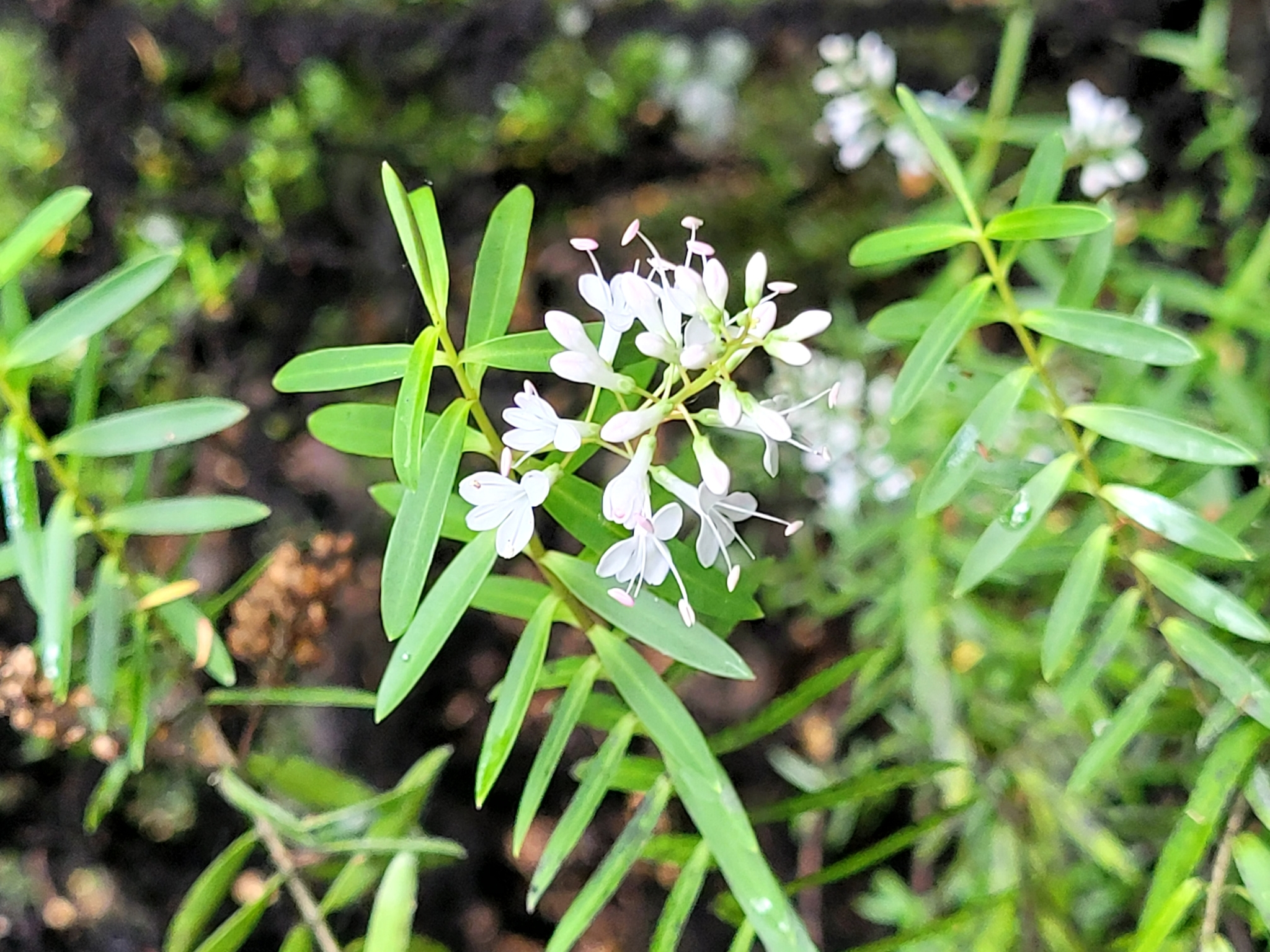

Scientific classification
- Kingdom: Plantae
- Clade: Tracheophytes
- Clade: Angiosperms
- Clade: Eudicots
- Clade: Asterids
- Order: Lamiales
- Family: Plantaginaceae
- Genus: Veronica
- Section: Veronica sect. Hebe
- Species: V. traversii

Binomial name
- Veronica traversii Hook.f.

Synonyms
- Hebe traversii (Hook.f.) Cockayne & Allan

= Veronica traversii =

Species of flowering plant in the plantain family

Veronica traversii, synonym Hebe traversii, is a flowering ornamental plant of the family Plantaginaceae. It is endemic to the South Island of New Zealand. The specific epithet traversii is in honour of naturalist Henry H. Travers (1844–1928), son of William Thomas Locke Travers.
