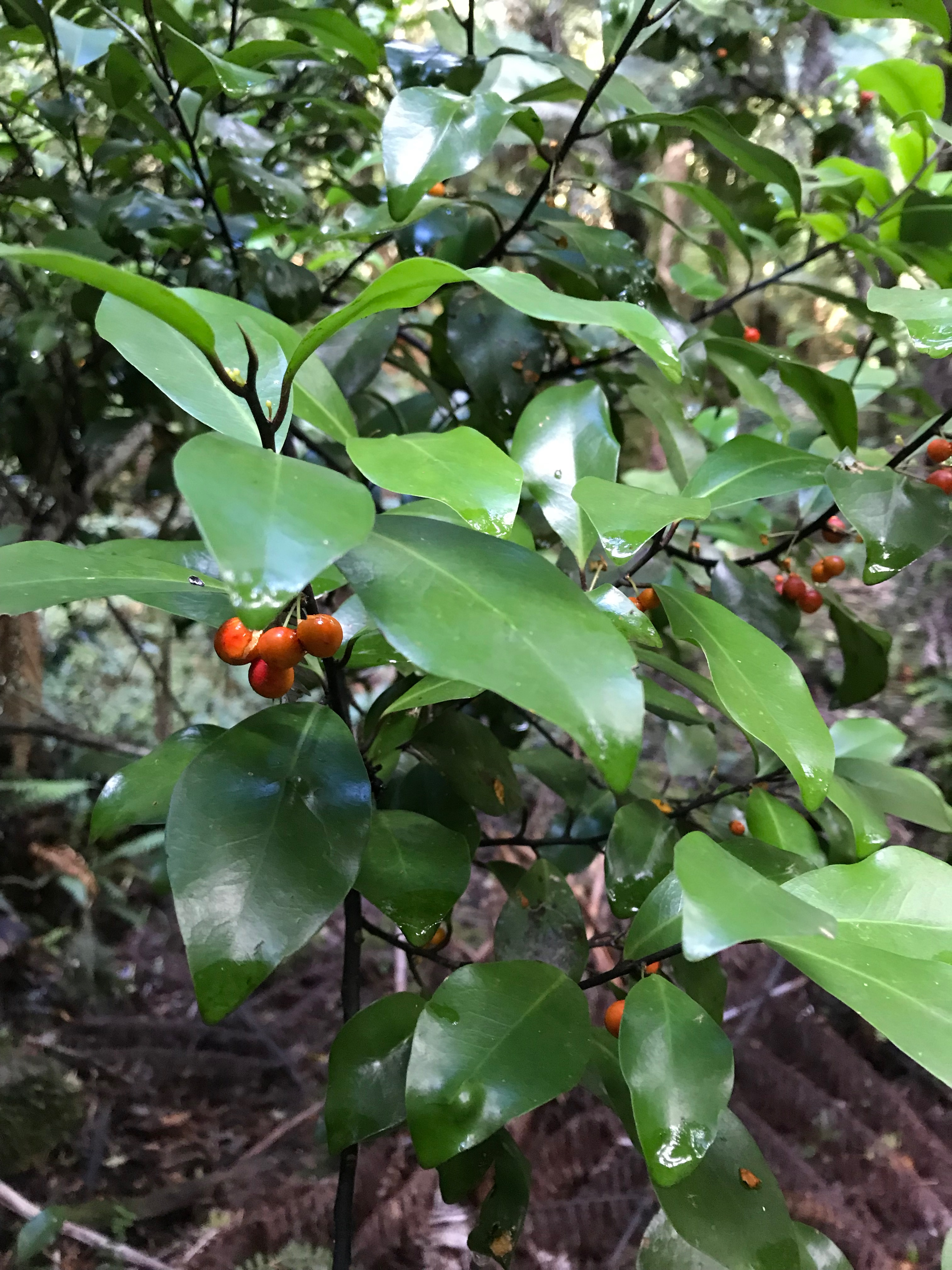

Conservation status
- Least Concern (IUCN 3.1)

Scientific classification
- Kingdom: Plantae
- Clade: Tracheophytes
- Clade: Angiosperms
- Clade: Magnoliids
- Order: Canellales
- Family: Winteraceae
- Genus: Pseudowintera
- Species: P. axillaris

Binomial name
- Pseudowintera axillaris (J.R. Forst. & G.Forst.) Dandy

Synonyms
- Drimys axillaris J.R.Forst. & G.Forst.; Wintera axillaris (J.R.Forst. & G.Forst.) G.Forst.; Wintera terminalis Tiegh.

= Pseudowintera axillaris =

Species of shrub

Pseudowintera axillaris, the lowland horopito, is a shrub like tree, endemic to New Zealand. They are members of the Winteraceae family and are known for their peppery taste, and glossy green leaves.

It is one of the very few hardwood species whose wood lacks vessel elements, making it diffuse and vessel-less containing vasicentric tracheids instead.

== Description ==
Pseudowintera axillaris is one of four Winteraceae species endemic to New Zealand.

It has many distinguishing features that can identify it from other Winteraceae species. Growing up to 8 metres tall and a trunk up to 10 cm in diameter this small shrub-like tree, prefers damper, cold, tree shaded locations found in New Zealand forests in the North Island and the northern parts of the South Island. Distinguishing features of this plant include its dark green coloured leaves, and natural glossy wax that gives the underside a pale to glaucous but not white; midvein pale appearance. These leaves have smooth margins and unlike many other plant species, P. axillaris usually has no red or brown blotches or discolouration. Adult leaves can grow up to 6–10 cm long by 3–6 cm wide and have red leaf stalks, with yellowish midribs, and smooth margins. Juvenile leaves have distinctive, white, net-like secondary veins on the upper surface. Another known feature of the P. axillaris is the peppery taste it upholds when chewing. P. colorata is known for its extremely spicy peppery taste compared to that of a chilly, whereas P. axillaris has a slight, pleasant peppery taste, known to keep plant grazing insects away. P. axillaris has very dark red – black branches, with the branchlets usually becoming more black in colour toward the leaves. It is considered to be a very primitive flowering plant, and is one of the more common of the four Pseudowintera species, after P. colorata. The flowers are small in size, 10mm across, [bisexual] on quite long stalks, and greenish yellow in colour. They occur in clusters in the leaf axils or in the scars of fallen leaves. Petal numbers vary between 4-7 free petals, and calyx cup shaped. The petals are 5-6mm long, narrow-oblong to narrow-obovate, apex obtuse. Other parts of the flower are symmetrical apex obtuse, carpels 1–6, stigma apical very short stamens but many (6-20) crowded around a few short ovaries Pseudowintera axillaris fruits are berries, one from each ovary producing a 3-6-seeded fleshy globose to subglobose berry 5-6mm in diameter orange to red when ripe.

== Geographic distribution and habitat ==
=== Natural global range ===
Pseudowintera axillaris is endemic to New Zealand. Included within the family of Winteraceae where many of these plant species are found in Southern North America, and temperate Asia.

=== New Zealand range ===
Pseudowintera axillaris is commonly found in both the North and South Island, in Lowland and lower montane forests. From Kaitaia in the north down to the Marlborough sounds and the north west of the South Island. They are quite popular just South of Auckland, Specifically in the Waitakere region, and within the Northern parts of the South Island. P. colorata and P. axillaris are very similar in nature and are often found within the same locations and are quite common throughout New Zealand. They can live in unison with each other as competition is eliminated where P. axillaris prefers shaded, damp areas, and is often more present within lowland montane forests, whereas P. colorata prefers areas of higher light and are more frequent around the edges of these forests. They are highly adapted to their particular niche.

=== Habitat preferences ===
The lowland horopito favours colder and more shaded environments, where taller more invasive trees grow and provide a vegetative cover. New Zealand forests are known for their rich, nutrient dense soils, so P. axillaris has adapted to survive in conditions where this nutrient dense soil is present. The underlying factor here is that P. axillaris thrives where other taller plants flourish. This is due to the fact branches, leaves and twigs fall off these bigger trees and contribute to the nutrients of the soil below, creating a humus layer. The Humus layer is dark organic material that forms in soil as a result of decaying plants and even animals. This provides a stable and strong nutrient base for P. axillaris to thrive and also offers a stable water supply where the shade offers dampness.

== Phenology ==
=== Life cycle ===
Flowers occur as auxiliary fascicles from spring (September) to early summer (December) and fruits ripen to red from late spring (October till January), persisting on the plant through till winter (June). The P. axillaris remains relatively still through the January and February months as seen on the phenology graph. In a study of the reproductive ecology of the Pseudowintera axillaris it was found that this plant has a pollination system liable to change, relying on the transferral of pollen by Thrips obscuratus and small flies, as well as pollen being carried by wind. Pseudowintera axillaris flowers remain on the plant for 7–11 days and the stigmatic crests are responsive in the course of early anthesis, secreting a small supply of nectar, during the last days of flowering the anthers shed pollen. When a thrips has finished feeding on one flower it will crawl to the next, this usually being in the same inflorescence or the same branch, by this system both early anthesis flowers holding nectar and late anthesis flowers containing pollen are visited. These insect visits are few, and isolated plants bear very few fruits, along with low numbers of seed in each fruit. Along with the entire genus Pseudowintera, Pseudowintera axillaris models high rates of self‐sterility which appears to take place uniformly at the zygotic stage of embryogeny.

== Ecology ==
=== Edaphy ===
The lowland horopito favours cold, dark and damp locations, and are therefore found in higher frequencies throughout native New Zealand lowland forests. It is known that New Zealand forests are quite unique, where the actions of tectonism, volcanism, stratification, erosion, flooding and other naturally occurring processes all contribute to the production of soil development. We have harsh, however adaptable environments where soil is enriched with nutrients and provides a stable habitat for over 80% of New Zealand's native vascular plants. These native species are also usually endemic to New Zealand as it provides such a specified location where adaptations occur to fit these environments and nowhere else. Pseudowintera axillaris is a plant species that prefers shaded environments, meaning that this species must rely more so on soil and water quality to survive and reproduce, as a fundamental part of plant survival being sunlight is reduced. Photosynthesis can occur at low rates with the help of nutrient dense soil, water and shade tolerance. The most important macronutrients needed for plant growth is Nitrogen (N), Phosphorus (P) and Potassium (K). Nitrogen or protein rich soils are often found where manures, food scraps, decay and green leaves are present. This is why the Humus layer within Lower montane forests provides such a strong nutrient enriched base for shade loving plants.

=== Predators, parasites, and diseases ===
Pseudowintera species are not a threatened or endangered species as herbivore animals and insects do not appreciate the pungent, peppery taste given off the plant when eating. Both P. colorata and P. axillaris have this aromatic effect. There are however the common animal species that do provide hazards and disadvantages for New Zealand's native plant species. Possums for example are a huge pest to New Zealand as they eat and damage the forest at every point, taking mainly leaves, buds and fruits, as well as scratching tree bark and breaking small branchlets.

A common invasive species found in New Zealand's lowland forests are the large shrub Epiphytes. An epiphyte is a plant that grows off another plant. Griselinia lucida is the most common of the large shrub epiphytes and is distributed throughout both the North and South Island. Although these epiphytes usually intend to exploit larger trees, their biggest threat to the lowland horopito is their large roots that overcome the water supply and soil nutrients. They exploit the habitat around them.

A common parasite found in lowland to montane forests throughout the North Island is Dactylanthus taylorii (Pua Reinga – Flower of the Underworld). This species takes a liking toward smaller tree species, like the lowland horopito, and therefore poses a threat to Pseudowintera species, only in the North. The embryo root of a Dactylanthus seed exploits the slender root of its suitable host, by penetrating it, then gradually expands into a tube-like structure, eventually surrounding the host root.

Due to P. axillaris preferring cold, damp locations, it is often in competition with species of fungi. As a result, the Winteraceae family has managed to adapt with an efficient built-in defence mechanism of a compound called Sesquiterpene Dialdehyde polygodial which has many biological purposes including anti-fungal properties.

There are also many types of insects that use Pseudowintera as a host plant. Plant-SyNZ gives a reliability score: 0-10. 10 indicating a strong association to the Pseudowintera axillaris. The below species all received a 10

Group	Species	Location on host
Lepidoptera: Tortricidae	Maoritenes cyclobathra (Moth)	Caterpillars tunnel into terminal young shoots
Hemiptera: Aleyrodidae	Aleyrodes fodiens (Whitefly)	Pits in leaf
Hymenoptera: Apidae	Apis mellifera (honeybee)	Nests above the ground in large holes in trees – adults collect and feed off pollen
Acari: Tenuipalpidae	Tenuipalpus antipodes Collyer (Mite)	Feeds on leaves – laid in crevices and cracks of shrub tree
Hemiptera: Coccidae	Inglisia patella (Scale Insect)	Lives on the underside of leaves
Hemiptera: Diaspididae	Symeria pyriformis (Scale Insect)	Lives trees and shrubs, often causes Chlorotic spots on leaves

== Uses ==
=== Medicinal uses ===
The lowland horopito was initially used in cultures for its medical properties. The leaves produced a decoction used as a stimulant, for stomach aches, skin and venereal disease, where sap or leaves that are bruised and steeped in water is applied to the skin. A decoction of the leaves taken internally was known as ‘Maori painkiller’ or ‘bushman's painkiller’ and used for stomach aches and pains. Chewed leaves were used on toothaches. Early European settlers also used the bark as a substitute for quinine and the sap to aid skin diseases and cure gonorrhoea. They ingested the Horopito internally as an analgesic, antiseptic and a quinine substitute for chronic diarrhoea and stomach pain. Traditional uses also included, colds, flus, chest infections and asthma. In more recent times, the Horopito has been used for its antifungal properties treating bacterial and fungal infections such as Candida albicans. The P. axillaris in particular has been found to have higher levels of paxidal (2.2-6.9%). Paxidal is a medical ingredient used for headaches, toothaches, joint pain, period cramps and more.

=== Cultural uses ===
The dark-red wood of Pseudowintera species has also been used by woodworkers for ornamental work such as carving and inlaying
