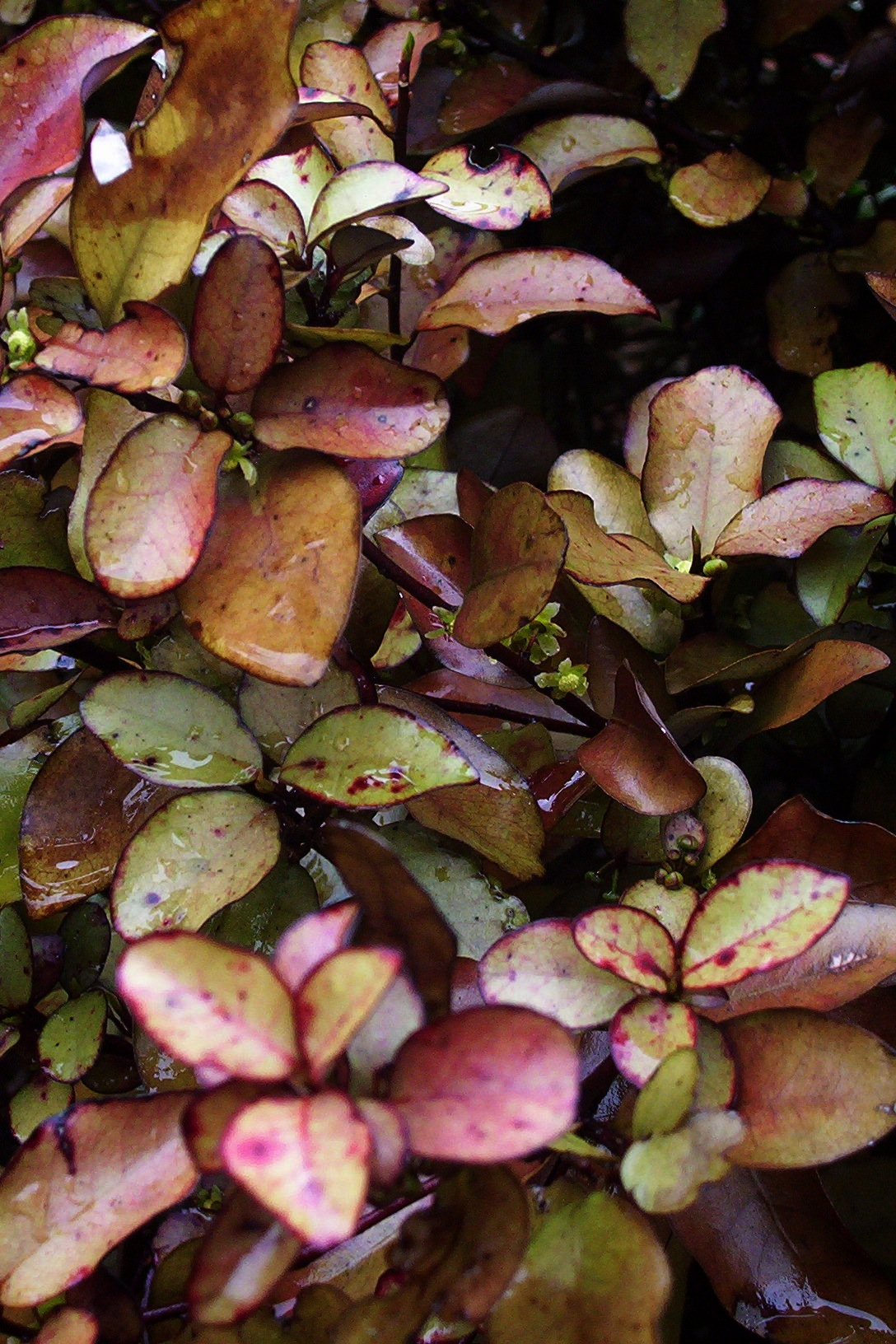

Conservation status
- Least Concern (IUCN 3.1)

Scientific classification
- Kingdom: Plantae
- Clade: Embryophytes
- Clade: Tracheophytes
- Clade: Spermatophytes
- Clade: Angiosperms
- Clade: Magnoliids
- Order: Canellales
- Family: Winteraceae
- Genus: Pseudowintera
- Species: P. colorata

Binomial name
- Pseudowintera colorata (Raoul) Dandy

Synonyms
- Drimys axillaris var. colorata (Raoul) Kirk; Drimys colorata Raoul; Pseudowintera axillaris var. colorata (Raoul) A.C.Sm.; Wintera colorata (Raoul) Tiegh.; Wintera monogyna Tiegh.

= Pseudowintera colorata =

Species of shrub endemic to New Zealand

Pseudowintera colorata, also known as mountain horopito or pepperwood, is a species of woody evergreen flowering trees and shrubs, part of family Winteraceae. The species is endemic to New Zealand. All Winteraceae are magnoliids, associated with the humid Antarctic flora of the Southern Hemisphere.

== Description ==
Pseudowintera colorata, or mountain horopito, is an evergreen shrub or small tree (1–2.5 m) commonly called pepperwood because its leaves have a hot taste. It is also known as the New Zealand pepper tree, winter's bark, or red horopito. It is so named because early taxonomists recognized the similarity between horopito and the South American Drimys winteri that provided the herbal remedy "winter's bark." They are both members of the family Winteraceae, which are mainly found on the landmasses that once made up the great southern continent of Gondwana – South America, Australia, New Zealand and New Guinea. Its yellowish-green leaves are blotched with red, with new leaves in the spring being bright red. It is distributed within lowland forests up to higher montane forests from 36° 30' South as far southward as Stewart Island / Rakiura, and as far north as the Waitakere Ranges. A characteristic plant association for P. colorata is within the Westland podocarp forests, where alliant understory plants such as Rumohra adiantiformis, Ascarina lucida, Neopanax colensoi, Raukaua edgerleyi, and Blechnum discolor are found.

The reproductive parts of the family Winteraceae are primitive, reflecting their origin among the first flowering plants. It is unusual in that its flowers come directly off the older stems rather than from among the leaves. It is a very slow-growing plant that lacks the specialist water-conducting tubes found in nearly all other flowering plants.

The evergreen horopito plant is continually exposed to attack by various insects and parasites and its occurrence in high rainfall areas makes it particularly susceptible to attack by fungi. This has led to efficient built-in defence mechanisms. Consequently, horopito has a rich source of secondary metabolites that have an interesting range of biologically active properties. The defenseless plant Alseuomia pusilla may be a Batesian mimic of P. colorata, as a way of protecting itself from herbivory.

== Uses ==
Pseudowintera colorata is grown as a spice, as an ornamental, and as a traditional medicinal plant.

=== Traditional medicine ===
Horopito has long been used by the indigenous Māori population of New Zealand both internally and externally for many purposes. As far back as 1848, Horopito is documented in the treatment of skin diseases such as ringworm, or venereal diseases. "The leaves and tender branches of this shrub are bruised and steeped in water, and the lotion used for ringworm; or the bruised leaves are used as a poultice for chafing of the skin, or to heal wounds, bruises or cuts". Infection due to Candida albicans (Māori – Haha, Haka) is documented as once being a major cause of death of Māori babies, due to their being fed an "unsatisfactory diet." The juice of Horopito leaves was placed straight in the mouth, or leaves of Horopito were steeped in water to extract the juice and this decoction was to treat what we now understand as candidiasis (oral thrush).

Early European settlers to New Zealand also used horopito for medicinal purposes. For internal use, leaves were either chewed or prepared as tea. "The leaves and bark are aromatic and pungent; the former is occasionally used by settlers suffering from diarrhoeic complaints." A decoction of the leaves was taken for stomach ache and was known as "Māori Painkiller" and "Bushman's Painkiller." There are accounts of the bark being used in the 19th century as a substitute for quinine: "The stimulating tonic and astringent properties of which are little inferior to winter's bark." A French nun, Mother Aubert, went to live among the Māori at the end of the 19th century, and the native plant remedies she later created became commercially available and widely used throughout the colony of New Zealand. Horopito was one of the two ingredients in her patent medicine, Karana. In a letter to the French Consul dated 2 December 1890, she described it as "superior to Quinquina [quinine] in the treatment of chronic stomach sickness. It has been very useful to me in cases of anaemia of debility, of continuous diarrhoea etc., etc. and in recovery from temperatures".

== Activity of chemical constituents ==
The main biologically active chemical component isolated from the leaves of P. colorata is polygodial. The chewed horopito leaf has a characteristically sharp, hot peppery taste. This is primarily due to polygodial which causes pungency on the tongue in concentrations as low as 0.1 μg.

An ex vivo study used a horopito and aniseed mixture (Kolorex) to inhibit the growth of C. albicans in the oral cavity. This research concluded that the antifungal action of Kolorex was constant against all species tested (including C. albicans, C. tropicalis, C. glabrata, C. guilermonii, C. parapsilosis and C. krusei) with a minimum inhibitory concentration of 1:20 (diluted with sterilised distilled water) of Kolorex.

Another study concluded that a mixture of horopito (containing polygonal) and aniseed (containing anethole) protects the gut of mice from colonization and dissemination of Candida albicans. After mice were inoculated with C. Albicans and treated with Kolorex, testing of intestinal samples showed that Kolorex treated mice had a much-reduced concentration of C. Albicans per gram of tissue. The data suggested that the horopito and aniseed product might exert an early competitive effect against colonisation.
