= Pimelea traversii =

Scientific classification
- Kingdom: Plantae
- Clade: Tracheophytes
- Clade: Angiosperms
- Clade: Eudicots
- Clade: Rosids
- Order: Malvales
- Family: Thymelaeaceae
- Genus: Pimelea
- Species: P. traversii

Binomial name
- Pimelea traversii Hook.f.

Species of shrub

Pimelea traversii is a species of shrub in the family Thymelaeaceae. It is native to New Zealand. The specific epithet traversii is in honor of naturalist Henry H. Travers (1844–1928), son of William Thomas Locke Travers.

== Description ==
The shrub grows bushy. Its branches grow tall and erect. It grows up to 60 cm (2 ft 0 in) tall, with hairy white and pink flowers that flower from October to April. It can be found on arenite, rock outcrops, and stable stone fields.

This species is one of several within its genus that plays host to the endemic moth Notoreas elegans.
