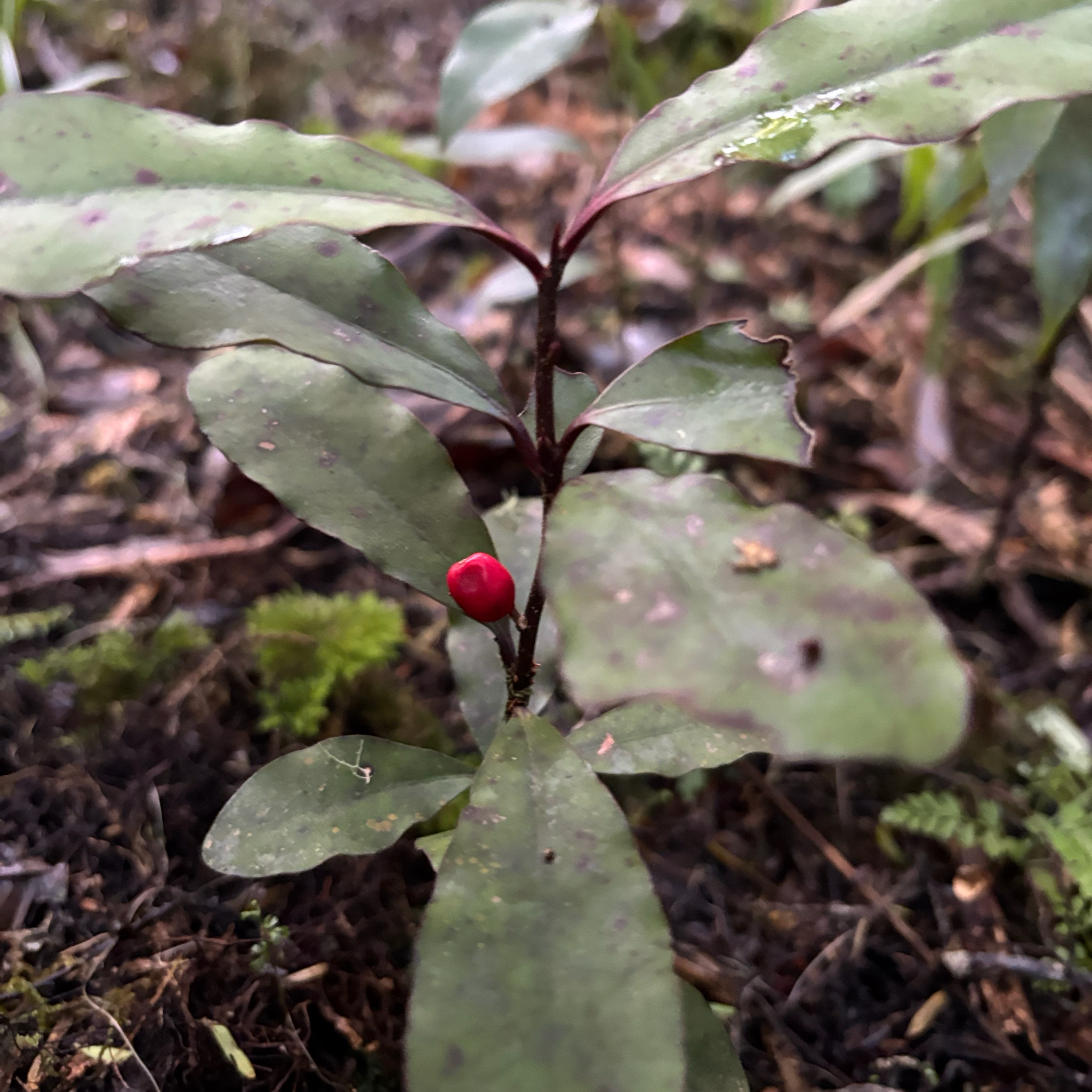
- A. pusilla in Pureora

Conservation status
- Not Threatened (NZ TCS)

Scientific classification
- Kingdom: Plantae
- Clade: Tracheophytes
- Clade: Angiosperms
- Clade: Eudicots
- Clade: Asterids
- Order: Asterales
- Family: Alseuosmiaceae
- Genus: Alseuosmia
- Species: A. pusilla

Binomial name
- Alseuosmia pusilla Colenso

= Alseuosmia pusilla =

Species of flowering plant

Alseuosmia pusilla, the mountain alseuosmia, is a species of flowering plant, endemic to New Zealand.

== Description ==
This plant is a small shrub, with glossy green leaves that can have a red margin. It rarely has a single or two branches, and grows up to 50cm.

It has a red fruit. The flowers are white or green with five lobes, and smell sweet.

== Range and habitat ==
Alseuosmia pusilla is found in the North Island to the south of Te Moehau and Mt Pirongia, and in the northwest corner of the South Island. It lives in montane habitats. It can grow up to 950m in elevation, and is generally found in beech or podocarp forests.

== Etymology ==
Pusilla means 'small'. The plant is known to be inconspicuous.

== Ecology ==
The leaf shape of this plant may be a Batesian mimic of the toxic plant Pseudowintera colorata, meaning that it has evolved a leaf shape that is similar as a way to defend itself from herbivory. This currently functions as a defense against introduced mammalian herbivores in New Zealand, but it also may prehistorically have functioned as a defense against moa.
