= Henry Travers (naturalist) =

New Zealand naturalist (1844–1928)

- Born: Henry Hammersley Travers; 1844; Hythe, Kent, England
- Died: 16 February 1928 (aged 83–84); Wellington, New Zealand
- Education: Nelson College
- Occupations: Naturalist, collector, taxidermist
- Relatives: William Travers (father)

Henry Hammersley Travers (1844 – 16 February 1928) was a New Zealand naturalist, professional collector and taxidermist. He was the son of the politician William Travers. Specimens collected by Travers are in the collection of the Museum of New Zealand Te Papa Tongarewa.

Born in Hythe, Kent, England, in 1844, and baptised at Cheriton, Kent, on 13 October of that year, Travers was the son of William Thomas Locke Travers and Jane Travers (née Oldham). The family emigrated to New Zealand by the ship Kelso in 1849. Travers was educated at Nelson College from 1856 to 1860. After leaving school, Travers spent some time travelling with his father on trips to explore and collect botanical specimens, especially in the South Island. Travers was admitted to the Bar around 1877 and worked for some time as a law clerk in his father's office. After declaring bankruptcy in 1888 following some mining investments gone wrong, he moved to Paraparaumu for about 12 years before returning to Wellington around 1900.

Travers made several expeditions to the Chatham Islands. In 1863 Travers' father paid the expenses for Travers to visit the Chatham Islands to collect rocks, fossils and botanical specimens. The plants collected were then described in a botanical dictionary written by Ferdinand von Mueller, botanist and director of the Botanic Gardens in Melbourne. During a stay of almost eight months in the Chatham Islands in 1871–1872, Travers obtained specimens of 37 species of birds previously recorded as living in the Chathams, found five species said to be not previously known to inhabit the Chathams, and found two previously unknown species. One of these, Petroica traversi (the black robin) was subsequently named after Travers. He also made a collection of botanical specimens which was sent to the botanist Dr Joseph Hooker to be named and classified. Sets of the specimens were sent to scientific societies overseas, and the original and most complete set was placed in the Colonial Museum (now Te Papa) in Wellington. The Canterbury Provincial Government gardener chose 24 plants to add to the Christchurch Domain Gardens.

After his failed legal career, Travers "eked out" an income from collecting birds and selling their skins to museums and other collectors. In 1894 Travers and his 13-year-old son visited the Auckland Islands and Snares Islands to collect birds, and in the same year at Stephens Island he collected some of the last known specimens of the newly discovered Lyall's wren, selling them to the Colonial Museum, Otago Museum and Walter Rothschild. In 1896 he was charged with asking a Masterton taxidermist to procure and kill seven huia and one kererū. Travers' father represented him, but he was convicted and fined. In 1906 he was accused of causing the extinction of two bird species on the Chatham Islands, a charge he vigorously denied.

In May 1899 Travers wrote to Wellington City Council to suggest that it should appoint him as curator of the Botanic Garden. He stated that "he would be able to do credit to the Gardens and make them worth looking at". He wrote that he had been engaged in growing plants outdoors and in greenhouses for many years, had intimate knowledge of many native plants and had communicated extensively with many foreign botanic gardens regarding plant exchanges.

In October 1913, Travers was appointed curator of the Newtown Museum. The museum had opened above the Newtown Public Library in 1909 with the donation of a collection by Edward W Petherick. By the time of Travers' appointment, there was criticism of the museum, with one reporter stating that "the Newtown Museum, as it stands at present, can almost be termed an old curiosity shop. Yet, though the indiscriminate collection of curios, stuffed animals, etc., haphazardly stored in the badly-lit rooms of the upper story of the library quite warrant this title, a few alterations and rearrangements would work wonders". Travers set about improving the museum, clearing away years of dust and rubbish and using his knowledge as a naturalist to rearrange and label specimens. However early in 1915, Wellington City Council terminated Travers' position as curator. He wrote a long letter advising the council of all the work he had done and the positive feedback he had received, but the council did not reconsider.

Travers was a member of the Royal Geographical Society and the New Zealand Institute. He died in Wellington on 16 February 1928, leaving a widow (Ida Jane, née Smith) and five adult children.

== Species ==
The following species and one genus were named in his honour:

- Mesoplodon traversii (spade-toothed whale)
- Petroica traversi (black robin)
- Pimelea traversii, a shrub
- Pseudowintera traversii, a woody shrub
- Traversia lyalli (Lyall's wren)
- Veronica traversii, an ornamental plant

== Bibliography ==
- Travers, Henry Hammersley. Notes on the Chatham Islands (lat. 44° 30' S., long. 175° W.) The Journal of the Linnean Society. Botany. (1867) 9:135–144.
