= James Edgar Dandy =

British botanist (1903–1976)

James Edgar Dandy (24 September 1903, in Preston, Lancashire – 10 November 1976, in Tring) was a British botanist, Keeper of Botany at the British Museum (Natural History) between 1956 and 1966. He was a world specialist on the plant genus Potamogeton and the family Magnoliaceae.

== Life ==
Dandy was educated at Preston Grammar School and after that at Downing College, Cambridge, where he took his B.A. In 1925, he was appointed as an assistant to John Hutchinson at Kew Gardens, who worked on a new Angiosperm classification. He gave Dandy the opportunity to revise three taxa, one of which was Magnoliaceae. He became Fellow of the Linnean Society in 1927. On 11 July the same year, he was appointed Second class Assistant at the British Museum Department of Botany. He stayed here until his retirement in 1966. In 1936 he was promoted to First class Assistant, in 1946 to Principal Scientific Officer, and in 1956 he eventually became Keeper of Botany. After his retirement, he kept active in the field of botany until he fell seriously ill, in July 1976.

Dandy was elected an Honorary Fellow of the Royal Horticultural Society and an Honorary Member of the Botanical Society of the British Isles. The genus Dandya was named in Dandy's honour by Harold E. Moore.

In 1929 Dandy married Joyce Isabelle Glaysher. He was predeceased by their daughter. Upon his death he was survived by his widow and their son.

== Publications ==
=== Magnoliaceae ===
- 1927 The Genera of Magnolieae. in: Bulletin of Miscellaneous Information, Royal Gardens, Kew 1927(7): 257–264.
- 1927 Michelia kisopa and M. doltsopa Buch.-Ham. (Magnoliaceae). in: Journal of Botany, British and Foreign (London) deel 65: 277–279
- 1927 The identity of Talauma villariana. in: Bulletin of Miscellaneous Information, Royal Gardens, Kew 1927(10): 419–420.
- 1928 Three new Magnolieae. in: Journal of Botany, British and Foreign (London) deel 66: 46–48.
- 1928 New or noteworthy Chinese Magnolieae. in: Notes from the Royal Botanic Garden, Edinburgh (Edinburgh) deel 16(77): 123–132.
- 1928 Malayan Magnolieae. in: Bulletin of Miscellaneous Information, Royal Gardens, Kew 1928(5): 183–193.
- 1928 Michelia montana and two allied new species. in: Journal of Botany, British and Foreign (London) deel 66: 319–322
- 1928 Two new michelias from Kwangtung. in: Journal of Botany, British and Foreign (London) deel 66: 359–361.
- 1928 Magnolia sinensis and M. nicholsoniana. in: Journal of the Royal Horticultural Society (London) deel 53(1): 115.
- 1929 A new Michelia from the borders of Tibet and Assam. in: Bulletin of Miscellaneous Information, Royal Gardens, Kew 1929(7): 222–223
- 1929 Three new michelias from Indo-China. in: Journal of Botany, British and Foreign (London) deel 67: 222–224.
- 1930 A new Magnolia from Honduras. in: Journal of Botany, British and Foreign (London) deel 68: 146–147.
- 1930 New Magnolieae from China and Indo-China. in: Journal of Botany, British and Foreign (London) deel 68(7): 204–214.
- 1931 Four new Magnolieae from Kwangsi. in: Journal of Botany, British and Foreign (London) deel 69(9): 231–233.
- 1933 A second species of Pachylarnax (Magnoliaceae). in: Journal of Botany, British and Foreign (London) deel 71: 312–313.
- 1934 The identity of Lassonia Buc'hoz. in: Journal of Botany, British and Foreign (London) deel 72: 101–103.
- 1936 Magnolia globosa. in: The Botanical Magazine, or, Flower-Garden Displayed (London) deel 159: t.9467.
- 1943 Michelia doltsopa. in: The Botanical Magazine, or, Flower-Garden Displayed (London) deel 164: t.9645.
- 1948 Magnolia dawsoniana. in: The Botanical Magazine, or, Flower-Garden Displayed (London) deel 164: t.9678–9679.
- 1948 Magnolia nitida. in: The Botanical Magazine, or, Flower-Garden Displayed (London) deel 165: t.16.
- 1950 The Highdown Magnolia. in: Journal of the Royal Horticultural Society (London) deel 75: 159–161.
- 1951 A Survey of the genus Magnolia together with Manglietia and Michelia. in: P.M. Synge [ed.] Camellias and Magnolias, Report of the Conference held by The Royal Horticultural Society April 4–5, 1950: 64–81.
- 1963 Magnoliaceae, in R.E. Woodson & al., Flora of Panama, Part IV, Fascicle 5. in: Annals of the Missouri Botanical Garden (St. Louis, MO) deel 49(3/4): 173–176.
- 1964 Manglietia insignis. in: The Botanical Magazine, or, Flower-Garden Displayed (London) deel 175: t.443.
- 1964 Magnolia virginiana. in: The Botanical Magazine, or, Flower-Garden Displayed (London) deel 175: t.457.
- 1971 The classification of the Magnoliaceae. in: Newsletter of the American Magnolia Society deel 8: 3–6.

=== Other ===
- 1958 The Sloane Herbarium: an annotated list of the Horti Sicci composing it, with biographical accounts of the principal contributors. Based on records compiled by the late James Britten. With an introduction by Spencer Savage. Revised and edited by J.E. Dandy
- 1958 List of British vascular plants. Prepared for the British Museum (Natural History) and the Botanical Society of the British Isles. Incorporating the London catalogue of British plants.
- 1967 Index of generic names of vascular plants, 1753–1774. International Bureau for Plant Taxonomy and Nomenclature.
