= John Buchanan (botanist) =

New Zealand botanist and scientific artist (1819-1898)

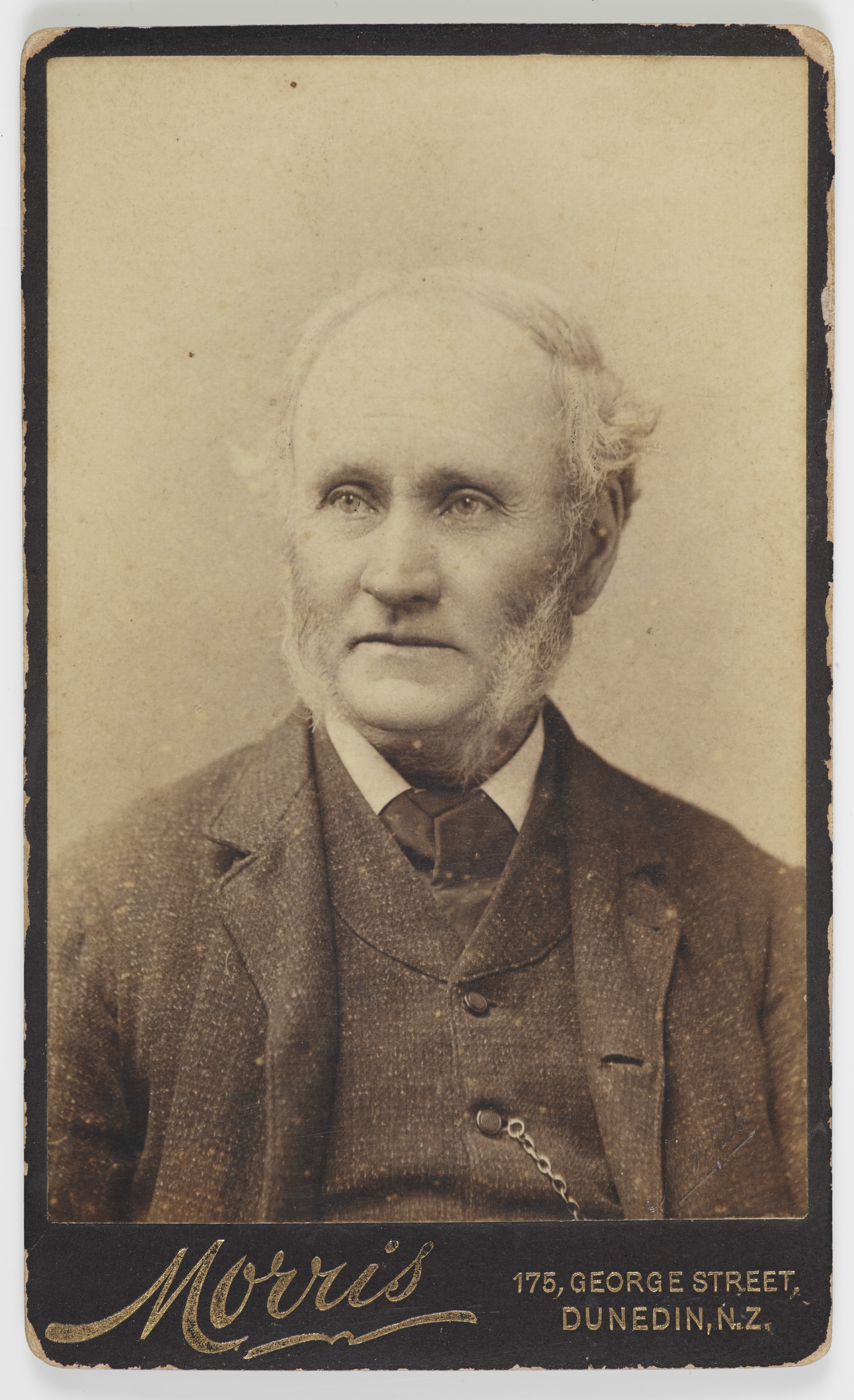
John Buchanan, 1883–1890, Dunedin, by John Richard Morris. No Known Copyright Restrictions. Te Papa (O.041253)

John Buchanan (13 October 1819 – 18 October 1898) was a New Zealand botanist and scientific artist. He was a fellow of the Linnean Society.

== Biography ==
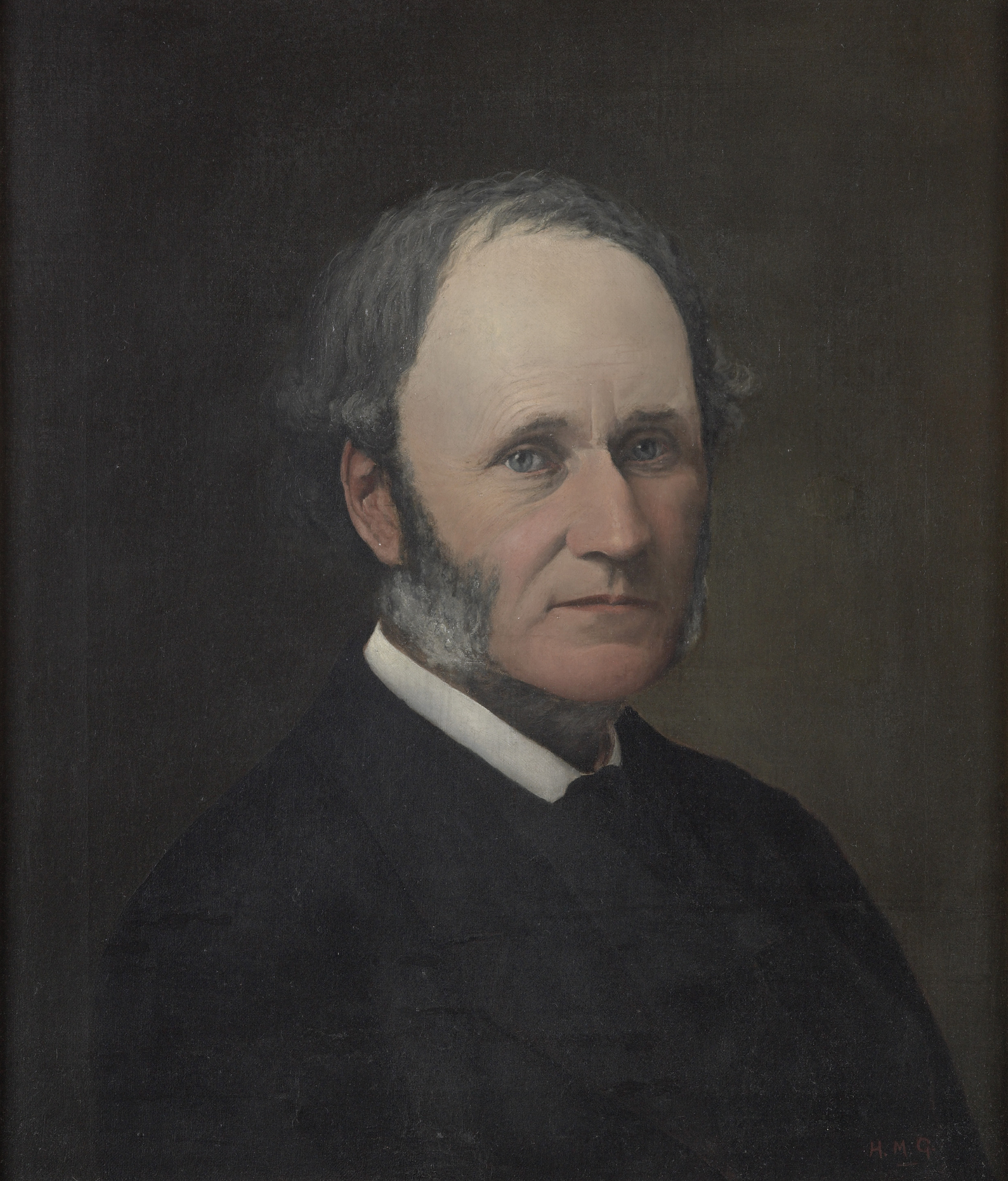
Portrait of John Buchanan, New Zealand, by Henry Morland Gore. Gift of the New Zealand Institute, 1885. No Known Copyright Restrictions. Te Papa (1992-0035-1685)

Buchanan was born in Dunbartonshire, Scotland, and in his early life apprenticed as a calico pattern designer, then was foreman of a drawing shop, with a hobby of botany. He emigrated to Dunedin, New Zealand, in 1852, in the early years of the Scottish settlement, and worked as a survey assistant and gold prospector during the Otago gold rush. During this time, he was an amateur botanist, collecting plant specimens that he sent to John Ross, a friend in Scotland who was also an amateur botanist. When James Hector was leaving Britain in 1861 to head the Geological Survey of Otago, Joseph Dalton Hooker, who had heard of Buchanan from Ross, suggested him to Hector as a botanist. In 1862 Hector employed Buchanan as a botanist and draughtsman for his survey of Otago and the West Coast of the South Island.

When the Geological Survey and Colonial Museum (now the Museum of New Zealand Te Papa Tongarewa) was established in Wellington in 1865 with Hector as its director, Buchanan was employed in the same role he had in the earlier survey. During the next 20 years, Buchanan took botanical and geological field trips all over New Zealand, and surveyed the plants growing in the Wellington Botanic Garden. From 1868 he was a full-time draughtsman and illustrator, drawing and/or lithographing many of the illustrations for the Transactions of the New Zealand Institute and the Reports of Geological Exploration. Buchanan never married and was a prodigious worker, often being at the museum until late at night.

He retired in June 1885 with a year's leave on full pay, officially starting his retirement in June 1886. He returned to his home in Dunedin on retirement, and died on 18 October 1898.

== Works ==
- Botanical notes on the Kaikōura Mountains and Mount Egmont (1867)
- Manual of the indigenous grasses of New Zealand (1880)

Buchanan had some 29 publications in the Transactions and Proceedings of the Royal Society of New Zealand, including his identification of new species.

== Artworks ==
- Contributed woodcuts to Walter Buller's Manual of New Zealand Birds
- Contributed scientific illustrations to Frederick Hutton's Fishes of New Zealand
