= Endemic flora of the Chatham Islands =

The Chatham Islands comprise 40 islands and rocks.

Although over 650 km (400 mi) from the main islands, the flora of the Chatham Islands is largely similar to the rest of New Zealand. About 400 of the 875 taxa (including hybrids) attested in the Chatham Islands are indigenous to them; of these, only 47 are endemic to the islands. The endemic plants of the islands are divided between taxa related to those on the North Island and those with stronger links to the South Island and the subantarctic islands of New Zealand. The flora of the Chatham Islands were described from samples in the mid-1800s by botanists Joseph Hooker and Ferdinand von Mueller, neither of whom ever visited the islands, while Leonard Cockayne provided the first comprehensive Chatham Islands Flora in the early 1900s. The islands have become highly noted for their flora and fauna, attracting ecotourists. One endemic, the Chatham Islands forget-me-not (Myosotidium hortensia), has become a botanical symbol of the islands due to its widespread cultivation in and outside New Zealand.

The Chatham archipelago comprises 40 islands and rocks. In addition to the larger islands of Chatham and Pitt Island, both endemic and introduced plants are found on various smaller islets. Coastal forests on the islands are dominated by indigenous and endemic trees such as Olearia traversiorum and Coprosma chatamica, with trees such as Dracophyllum arboreum further inland. In the wettest areas on the islands grow swamp forests of Coprosma propinqua and Olearia telmatica. Shore plants have a higher portion of naturalized species, often to the detriment of endemic flora. Although many of the endemic taxa are threatened from naturalized flora and grazing by livestock, the populations of many species have rebounded since the 1980s due to widespread environmental regeneration practices. However, many taxa continue to be at risk, including three taxa listed as Nationally Critical by the New Zealand Threat Classification System (NZTCS).

== Vascular plants ==
Endemic vascular plants of the Chatham Islands
Scientific name	Image	Common name(s)	Family	NZTCS	Distribution	Ref.
Aciphylla dieffenbachii (F.Muell.) Kirk, 1899	clusters of small flowers	Dieffenbach's speargrass, soft speargrass, coxella	Apiaceae	Declining	Chatham, Pitt, Mangere, South East, small islets	
Aciphylla traversii (F.Muell.) Hook.f., 1867	Flowers emerging from fronds	Chatham Island speargrass, taramea karupuru	Apiaceae	Declining	Chatham, Pitt	
Asplenium chathamense Brownsey, 1985	Small fronds emerging from the ground	Chatham Island spleenwort	Aspleniaceae	Naturally Uncommon	Chatham, Pitt, Mangere, South East, small islets	
Astelia chathamica (Skottsb.) L.B.Moore, 1966	Lines of flowers alongside large leaves	Chatham Islands kakaha, Moriori flax	Asteliaceae	Declining	Chatham, Pitt	
Austroderia turbaria (Connor) N.P.Barker & H.P.Linder, 2010	Tall flowers	Chatham Island toetoe	Poaceae	Nationally Critical	Chatham, Pitt	
Brachyglottis huntii (F. Muell.) B.Nord., 1978	A bush with flowers	Chatham Island Christmas tree, rautini	Asteraceae	Nationally Vulnerable	Chatham, Pitt	
Callitriche chathamensis (R.Mason) Lansdown, 2022	Small leafy green plants emerging from dead brown plants	Chatham Island starwort	Plantaginaceae	Naturally Uncommon	Chatham, Pitt	
Carex chathamica Petrie, 1915	A sedge bush	Chatham sedge	Cyperaceae	Naturally Uncommon	Chatham, Pitt, South East	
Carex ventosa C.B.Clarke, 1906	A sedge bush	Chatham Islands forest sedge	Cyperaceae	Naturally Uncommon	Chatham, Pitt, Mangere, South East, small islets	
Coprosma chathamica Cockayne, 1901	A tall, thick-trunked tree with many thin, spindly branches coming off of it	Chatham Island karamū	Rubiaceae	Naturally Uncommon	Chatham, Pitt, South East	
Copromosa propinqua var. martini W.R.B.Oliv., 1935	A sapling in the woods	Tāpātāpā	Rubiaceae	Naturally Uncommon	Chatham, Pitt, South East	
Corokia macrocarpa Kirk, 1899	Small yellow flowers	Hokotaka, whakataka	Argophyllaceae	Naturally uncommon	Chatham, Pitt, Mangere, South East	
Disphyma papillatum Chinnock, 1971	A large pink flower	Chatham Island ice plant	Aizoaceae	Naturally uncommon	Chatham, Pitt, Mangere, South East, small islets	
Dracophyllum arboreum Cockayne, 1901	A tree in a grassy environment	Chatham Island grass tree, tarahinau	Ericaceae	Naturally Uncommon	Chatham, Pitt, South East	
Festuca coxii (Petrie) Hack., 1906	clumps of grass in a clearing	Cox's fescue	Poaceae	Naturally Uncommon	Chatham, Pitt, Mangere, South East, small islets	
Geranium traversii Hook.f., 1867	A pink and white flower	Chatham Island geranium	Geraniaceae	Naturally Uncommon	Chatham, Pitt, Mangere, South East, small islets	
Gentianella chathamica subsp. chathamica (Cheeseman) T.N.Ho & S.W.Liu, 1993	A cluster of small white flowers	Chatham Island gentian	Gentianaceae	Naturally Uncommon	Chatham, Pitt	
Leptecophylla robusta (Hook.f.) C.M.Weiller, 1999	Branches with pink berries	Pouteretere	Ericaceae	Naturally Uncommon	Chatham, Pitt	
Leptinella featherstonii F.Muell., 1864	Many small yellow flowers	Chatham Island button daisy, mutton bird plant	Asteraceae	Naturally Uncommon	Chatham, Pitt, Mangere, South East, small islets	
Linum monogynum var. chathamicum Cockayne, 1902	Several white flowers	Chatham Island linen flax	Linaceae	Nationally Critical	Chatham, Pitt, Mangere, South East	
Macrolearia chathamica (Kirk) Saldivia, 2022	A white flower with a burgundy center	Keketerehe	Asteraceae	Declining	Chatham, Pitt, Mangere, South East, Little Mangere	
Macrolearia semidentata (Decne. ex Hook.) Saldivia, 2022	A pink and purple flower	Hangatere, Chatham Island aster, swamp aster	Asteraceae	Declining	(Chatham Islands)	
Melicytus chathamicus (F.Muell.) Garn.-Jones, 1987	Branches with clusters of flowers	Inihina, hakina, hinahina, Chatham Island mahoe	Violaceae	Naturally Uncommon	Chatham, Pitt, Mangere, South East, small islets	
Myosotidium hortensia (Decne.) Baill., 1890	Many bright blue flowers	Kopakopa, Chatham Island forget-me-not, kopukapuka	Boraginaceae	Declining	Chatham, Pitt, Mangere, South East, small islets	
Myoporum semotum Heenan & de Lange, 2011	A tree in a forest	Chatham Islands myoporum	Scrophulariaceae	Declining	Chatham, Pitt, Mangere, South East	
Myrsine coxii Cockayne, 1902	Thin trees in a forest	Swamp matipo, swamp mapou, Cox's matipo	Primulaceae	Declining	Chatham, Pitt, South East	
Olearia telmatica Heenan & de Lange, 2008	Large trees with light bark in a grassy plain	Shell akeake, swamp akeake	Asteraceae	Declining	Chatham, Pitt, South East	
Olearia traversiorum (F.Muell.) Hook.f., 1867	Two trees on a grassy hill	Hakapiri, Chatham Island akeake	Asteraceae	Declining	Chatham, Pitt, South East, Mangere, small islets	
Plagianthus regius subsp. chathamicus (Cockayne) de Lange, 2008	A tree in a forest clearing	Chatham Island ribbonwood	Malvaceae	Declining	Chatham, Pitt, South East, Mangere, Little Mangere	
Poa chathamica Petrie, 1902	A slightly flattened clump of tall grass	Chatham Islands poa	Poaceae	Naturally Uncommon	Chatham, Pitt, South East, Mangere, small islets	
Pseudopanax chathamicus Kirk, 1899	Several large trees	Hoho, Chatham Island lancewood	Araliaceae	Naturally Uncommon	(Chatham Islands)	
Pterostylis silvicultrix (F.Muell.) D.L.Jones & M.A.Clem., 2002	Leaves poking out of dead leaf litter	Tutukiwi, Chatham Island greenhood	Orchidaceae	Naturally Uncommon	Chatham, Pitt, Mangere (possible)	
Senecio radiolatus subsp. radiolatus F.Muell., 1864	A clump of leaves and flowers growing out of the sand and rocks		Asteraceae	Naturally Uncommon	(Chatham Islands)	
Sonchus grandifolius Kirk, 1894	A close up of the flowers of grass	Pūhā pārākau rahi, embergeria, Chatham Island sow thistle	Asteraceae	Recovering	Chatham, Pitt, Mangere, South East, small islets	
Sporadanthus traversii (F.Muell.) Buchanan, 1875	A bush with purpleish flowers	Chatham Island bamboo rush	Restionaceae	Naturally Uncommon	Chatham	
Veronica barkeri Cockayne, 1899	Many plants with small purple and white flowers	Barker's koromiko, Chatham Island tree hebe	Plantaginaceae	Nationally Critical	Chatham, Pitt, South East	
Veronica chathamica Buchanan, 1875	Plants	Chatham Island koromiko	Plantaginaceae	Naturally Uncommon	Chatham, Pitt, Mangere, South East, small islets	
Veronica dieffenbachii Benth., 1846	Two bundles of white flowers	Dieffenbach's koromiko	Plantaginaceae	Naturally Uncommon	Chatham, Pitt, Mangere, South East	

== Non-vascular plants ==
Endemic non-vascular flora of the Chatham Islands
Scientific name	Image	Common name(s)	Family	NZTCS	Distribution	Ref.
Macromitrium longirostre var. ramsayae (Vitt) Fife, 2017	Green moss		Orthotrichaceae	Naturally Uncommon	Chatham, Pitt	
Sarcodia linearis (J.Agardh) Kylin, 1932	A clump of red seaweed		Sarcodiaceae	Data Deficient	(Chatham Islands)	
Ceramium chathamense G.Feldmann, 1950	A clump of red seaweed shaped like a dragonfly		Ceramiaceae	Data Deficient	(Chatham Islands)	
Durvillaea chathamensis C.H.Hay, 1979	kelp at the beach		Durvillaeaceae	Naturally Uncommon	(Chatham Islands)	
Gigartina grandifida J.Agardh, 1876	Slide with dried red seaweed		Gigartinaceae	Naturally Uncommon	(Chatham Islands)	
Lessonia tholiformis C.H.Hay, 1989	A clump of kelp		Lessoniaceae	Naturally Uncommon	(Chatham Islands)	
Landsburgia myricifolia J.Agardh, 1870	Slide with dried seaweed		Sargassaceae	Naturally Uncommon	(Chatham Islands)	
Lecanora kohu Printzen, Blanchon, Fryday & de Lange, 2017	Lichen		Lecanoraceae		(Chatham Islands)	
Pyrophyllon cameronii (W.A.Nelson) W.A.Nelson, 2003	Kelp		Erythrotrichiaceae	Naturally Uncommon	(Chatham Islands)	
