= Flora of the Chatham Islands =

The flora of the Chatham Islands consists of around 388 terrestrial plant species, of which 47 are endemic. The Chatham Islands make up the Chatham floristic province of the Neozeylandic Region of the Antarctic Kingdom.

The flora of the Chatham Islands include:

- Phormium chathams (Chatham Island flax)
- Myosotidium hortensia (Chatham Islands forget-me-not)
- Aciphylla dieffenbachii (soft speargrass)
- Astelia chathamica (Chatham Islands kakaha)
- Brachyglottis huntii (rautini)
- Coprosma chathamica (Chatham Islands Karamu)
- Dracophyllum arboreum (tarahinau)
- Dracophyllum scoparium (swamp heath)
- Drosera binata (fork leaved sundew)
- Embergeria grandifolia (giant sowthistle)
- Geranium traversii (Chatham Islands geranium)
- Lepidium oleraceum (Cook's scurvy grass)
- Leptinella featherstonii (button daisy)
- Linum monogynum var. chathamicum (linen flax)
- Hebe chathamica
- Hebe dieffenbachii
- Olearia chathamica (keketerehe)
- Olearia semidentata (swamp aster)
- Olearia traversiorum (Chatham Island akeake or Chatham Island tree daisy)
- Rhopalostylis sapida (nīkau)
- Sophora chathamica (kowhai)
- Utricularia delicatula
- Veronica barkeri (tree koromiko)

== See also ==
- Endemic flora of the Chatham Islands
