= Nīkau Bush Conservation Area =

Protected area in Chatham Islands, New Zealand

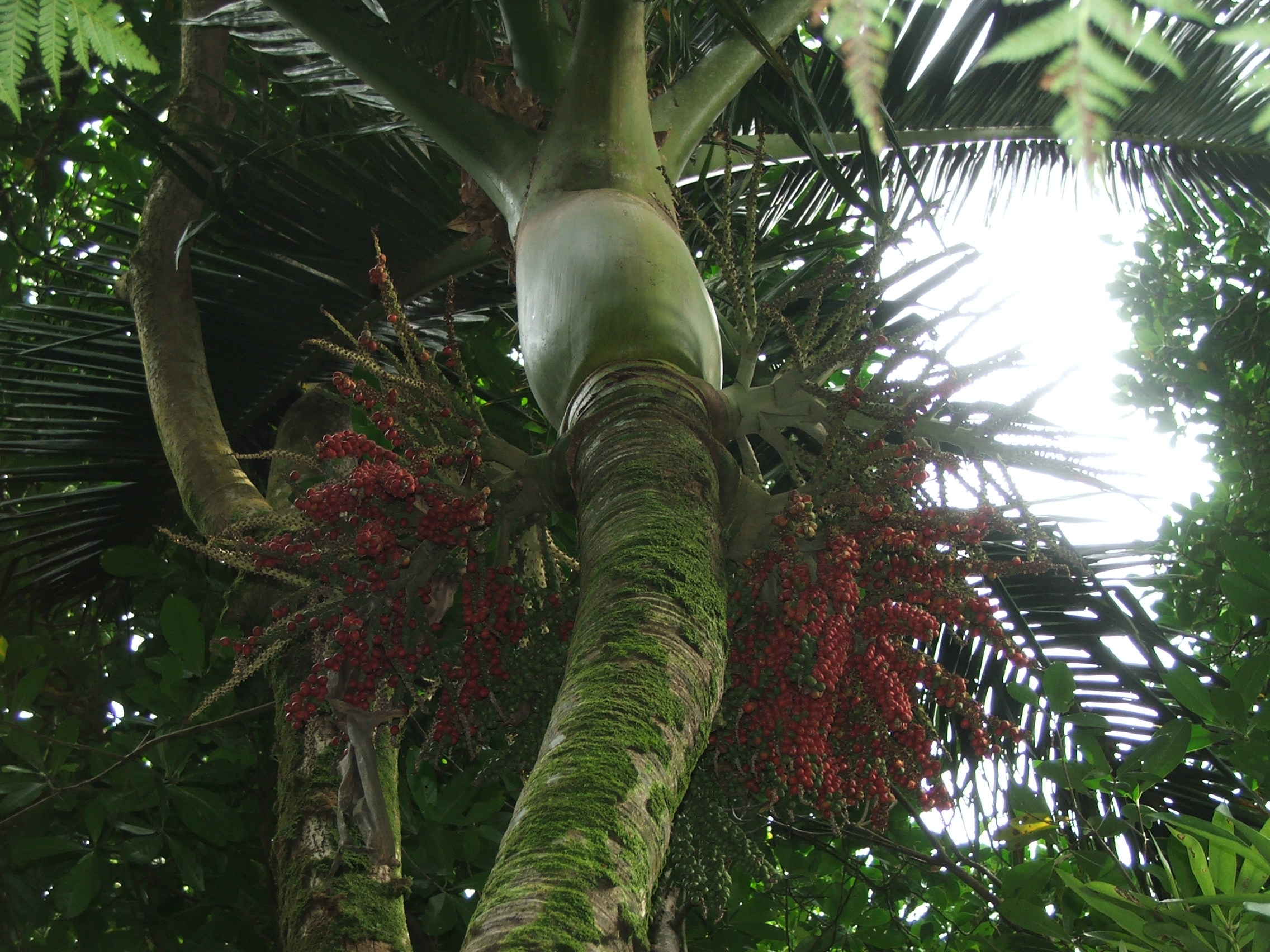
- Nīkau (Rhopalostylis sapida 'Chathamica')
- Interactive map of Nīkau Bush Conservation Area
- Nearest city: Waitangi, Chatham Islands
- Coordinates: 43°45′51″S 176°33′58″W
- Area: 19 ha (47 acres)
- Established: 1981

Nīkau Bush Conservation Area is a protected area of 19 ha (47 acres) of remnant lowland broadleaved forest in the Chatham Islands of New Zealand. The reserve is located on Chatham Island immediately to the west of Te Whanga Lagoon around 24 km (15 mi) north of Waitangi, and contains the largest group of nīkau ('Rhopalostylis sapida 'Chathamica') on Chatham Island. (Note: As of 2026, the LINZ data service shows two adjoining parcels of land in the Protected Areas dataset. The upper bush area is described as the Nīkau Bush Conservation Area, with an area of 17.365 ha, classified as s.25 - Stewardship Area under the Conservation Act 1987. The adjoining lower bush area is described as Scenic Reserve, Lower Nikau Bush, with an area of 15.451 ha, classified as s.19(1)(a) - Scenic Reserve under the Reserves Act 1977. The origin of the 19 ha area given in multiple published sources is unclear.)

In 1971, the area was identified as a priority for the establishment of a reserve in a report by the Botany Division of the Department of Scientific and Industrial Research. A summary of the examples of mixed broadleaf forest in the Chatham Islands stated:

On main Chatham there is one small patch of bush which is fairly mixed, ranging from well drained soil with karaka to poorly drained soil with some swampy akeake - karamu forest, and included in the patch is the most accessible clump of nikaus on main Chatham.

The land was purchased by the Crown in 1981, and stock fencing was installed to allow regeneration to occur. The reserve has an upper and lower area of original forest with plantings of Veronica barkeri, rautini (Brachyglottis huntii), swamp akeake (Olearia telmatica), Chatham Island toetoe (Austroderia turbaria) and Chatham Island astelia (Astelia chathamica).

The Chatham Islands nīkau found in the reserve is closely similar to the mainland New Zealand species but with a distinct juvenile form, larger fruits, and thicker covering of hairs on the fronds. The nīkau flower in December and January.

There is a walking track through the reserve that is promoted as a visitor attraction.

In 2023, the Nīkau Bush Conservation Area was included in an assessment of possible sites for future translocation of the endangered Chatham Island black robin. However, the site was not forecast to be sufficiently productive to sustain a population of the black robin, and was not selected for further study.
