= Tutukiwi =

Tutukiwi is a common name of Māori etymology for several organisms native to New Zealand and may refer to:

- Birds in the genus Coenocorypha, including:
  - Coenocorypha huegeli, occurring on the Snares Islands
  - Coenocorypha iredalei, an extinct species which occurred on the South Island and Stewart Island
- Plants in the genus Pterostylis, including:
  - Pterostylis banksii, occurring on the North and South Islands, Chatham Island and Stewart Island
  - Pterostylis silvicultrix, occurring on the Chatham Islands
