= Akeake =

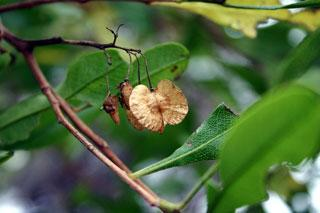
Dodonaea viscosa

Akeake is the name of at least three New Zealand species of tree:

- Dodonaea viscosa, akeake
- Shawia avicenniifolia, mountain akeake or tree daisy
- Olearia telmatica, shell akeake or swamp akeake
- Olearia traversiorum, Chatham Island akeake or Chatham Island tree daisy

The species are small trees. The name goes back to pre-European times when it was used in different areas of New Zealand. In post-European times it is used most frequently, but not exclusively, for Dodonaea viscosa.
