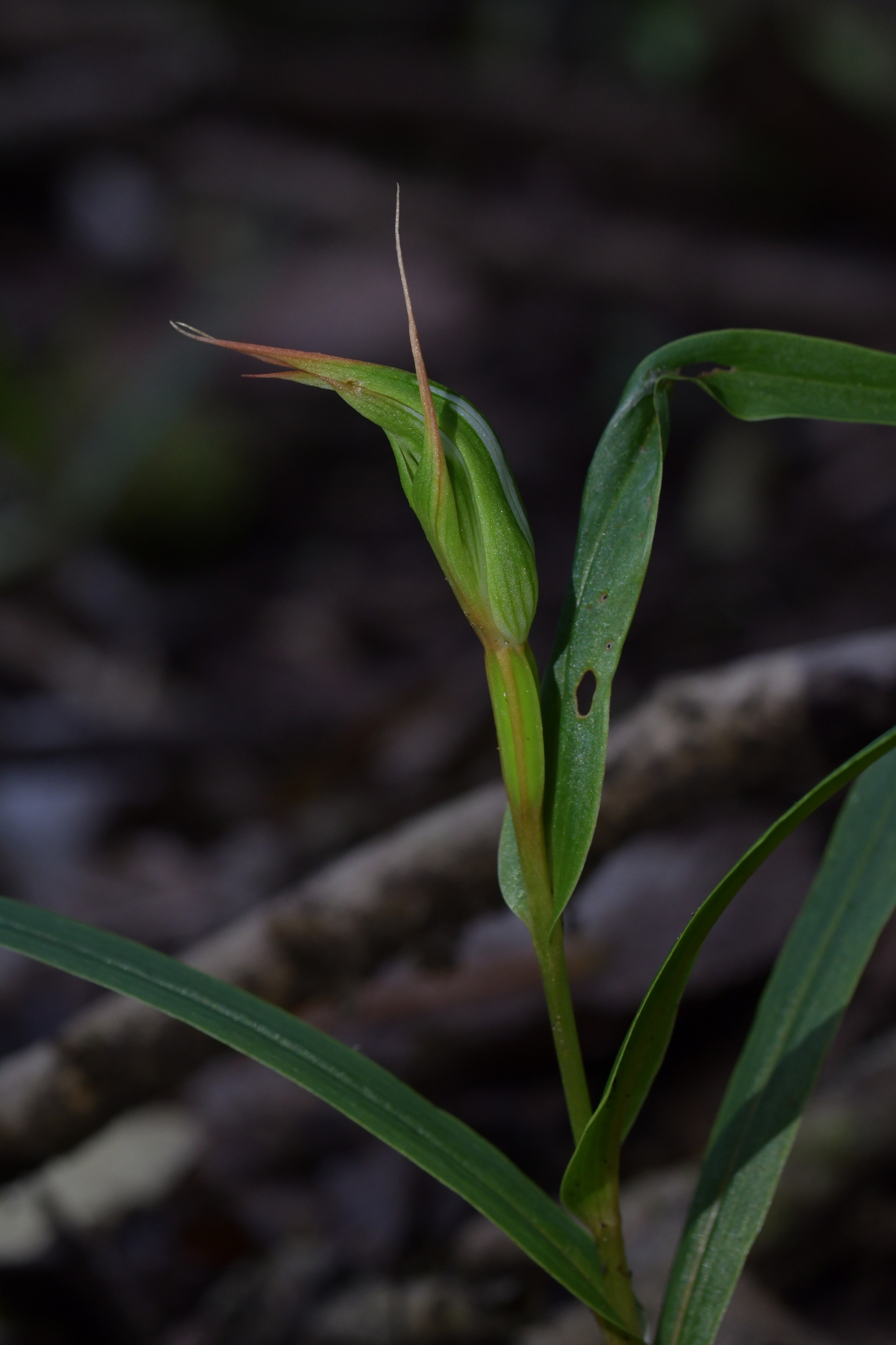

Scientific classification
- Kingdom: Plantae
- Clade: Tracheophytes
- Clade: Angiosperms
- Clade: Monocots
- Order: Asparagales
- Family: Orchidaceae
- Subfamily: Orchidoideae
- Tribe: Cranichideae
- Genus: Pterostylis
- Species: P. cardiostigma

Binomial name
- Pterostylis cardiostigma D.Cooper

= Pterostylis cardiostigma =

Species of orchid

Pterostylis cardiostigma is a species of orchid endemic to New Zealand. It has erect leaves, the upper leaves higher than the flower which is stiff, upright and green with narrow white stripes and pinkish tips. It barely opens fully and is sometimes mistaken for an unopened flower of Pterostylis banksii with which it often grows.

== Description ==
Pterostylis cardiostigma is a terrestrial, perennial, deciduous, herb with a large, heart-shaped underground tuber. There are between four and seven upright leaves on the flowering stem, the uppermost leaf higher than the flower. The leaves are erect, linear to lance-shaped, 80–280 mm (3–10 in) long and 10–20 mm (0.4–0.8 in) wide, with a prominent red keel. The flower is green with fine white stripes and pink or red tips and is borne on a flowering stem 60–350 mm (2–10 in) tall. The dorsal sepal and petals are fused, forming a narrow hood or "galea" over the column and the dorsal sepal is 5–10 mm (0.2–0.4 in) longer than the petals. The lower half of the galea is vertical, the upper part curves forward, but never as far as the horizontal. The lateral sepals are more or less erect, much higher than the galea and have long, narrow, red, thread-like tips. The labellum is curved, red and pointed. Although it can only be seen by opening the flower, the stigma has a characteristic heart shape. Flowering occurs from October to December.

== Taxonomy and naming ==
Pterostylis cardiostigma was first formally described in 1983 by Dorothy Cooper and the description was published in New Zealand Journal of Botany from a specimen she collected at Days Bay. The specific epithet (cardiostigma) is derived from the Ancient Greek words kardia meaning "heart" and stigma meaning the part of the flower that receives pollen.

== Distribution and habitat ==
This greenhood grows in scrub and forest on both the North and South Islands of New Zealand. It is often found with P. banksii.

== Ecology ==
The flowers of P. cardiostigma are very narrow and often appear not to be fully open. Early in the development of the flower, the labellum protrudes, suggesting that pollination can take place. However, the stigma is larger than in other Pterostylis and pollinia often fall onto it so that self-pollination also occurs.
