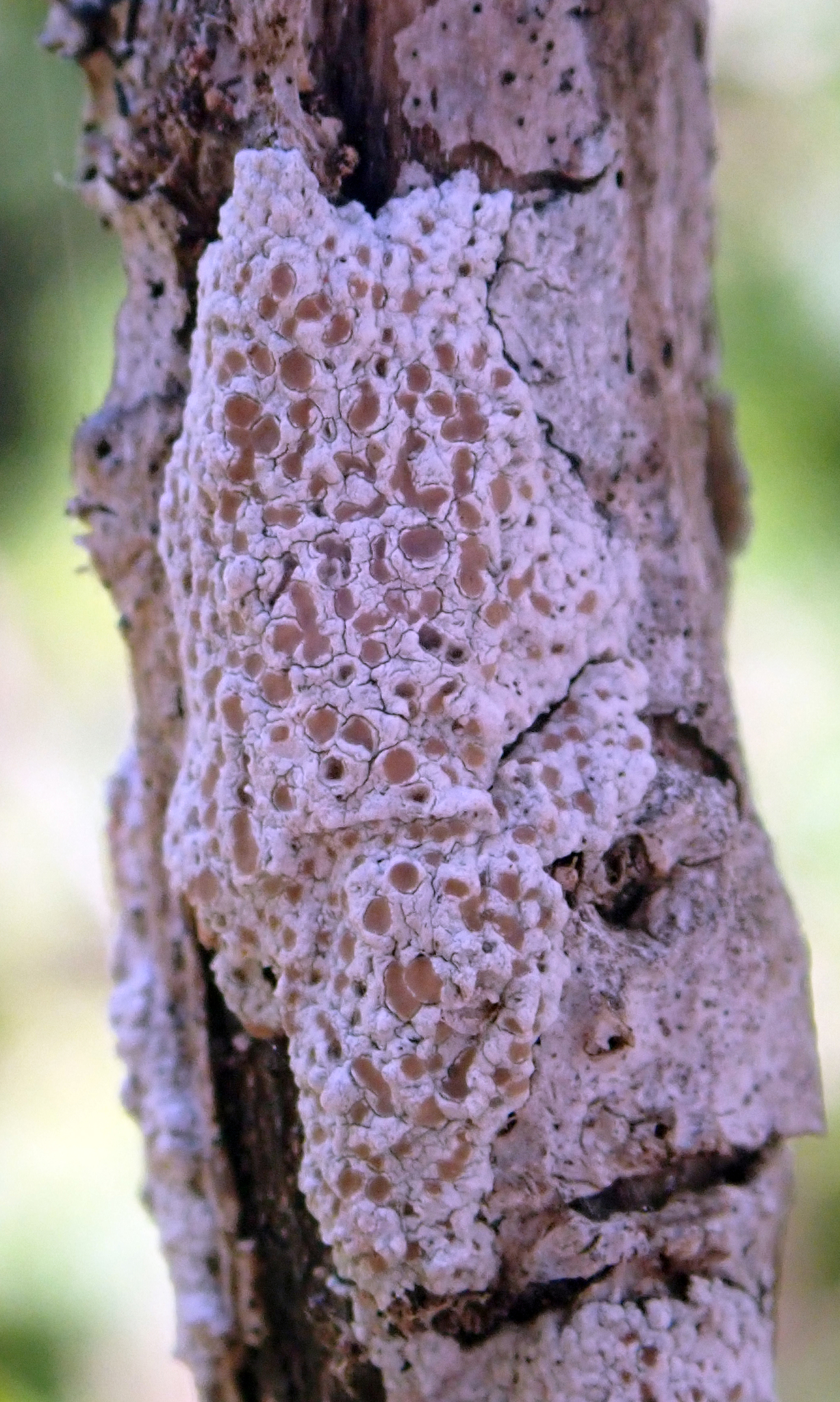
- Lecanora kohu on the bark of a Coprosma chathamica on Chatham Island

Conservation status
- Data Deficient (NZ TCS)

Scientific classification
- Domain: Eukaryota
- Kingdom: Fungi
- Division: Ascomycota
- Class: Lecanoromycetes
- Order: Lecanorales
- Family: Lecanoraceae
- Genus: Lecanora
- Species: L. kohu

Binomial name
- Lecanora kohu Printzen, Blanchon, Fryday & de Lange (2017)

= Lecanora kohu =

Species of lichen

Lecanora kohu is a species of corticolous lichen in the family Lecanoraceae. Endemic to the Chatham Islands of New Zealand, it was formally described as new to science in 2017.

== Description ==
Lecanora kohu has a crustose thallus, is greenish-white when fresh (drying to a pale yellow/cream colour), and has no soredia or isidia. The species has areoles with irregular-crenate margins measuring 0.25–0.5 mm (0.0098–0.0197 in) in length. It is similar in morphology to Lecanora symmicta, from which it is distinguished by the continuous, areolate thallus, immersed apothecia with pale pink to pink-brown discs, and by the presence of atranorin and psoromic acid rather than usnic acid, zeorin and xanthones in the thallus.

== Taxonomy ==
The lichen was formally described as a new species by Christian Printzen, Dan Blanchon, Alan Michael Fryday and Peter de Lange in 2017, based on a holotype collected from Rangatira Island in the Chatham Islands group by de Lange in 2015, and is held in the herbarium of Unitec Institute of Technology in Mount Albert, Auckland. The species epithet refers to the Māori language word for mist, kohu, referring to the sea fog that typically shrouds Rangatira Island, the type locality.

== Distribution and habitat ==
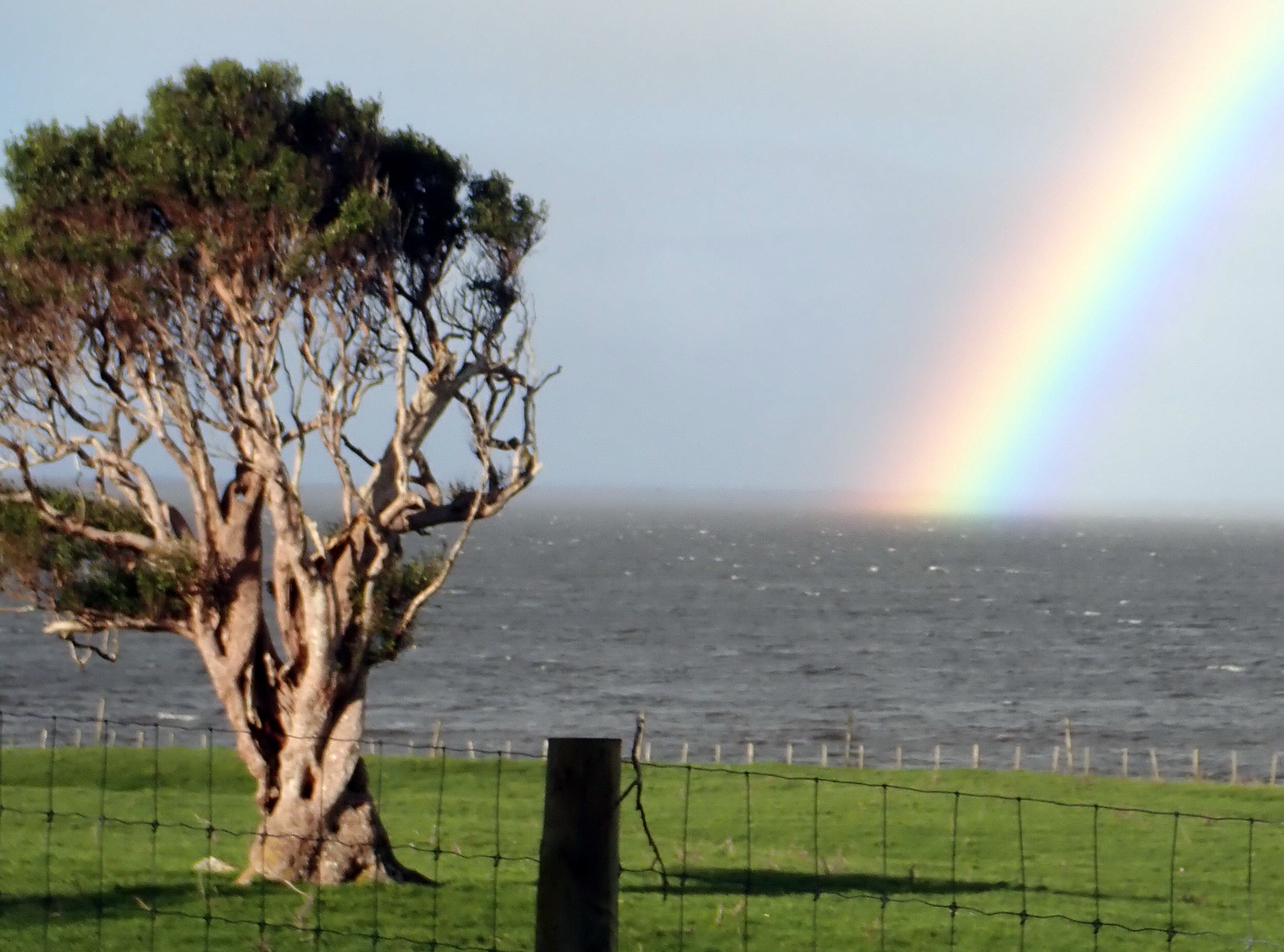
Lecanora kohu typically lives on the bark of trees in exposed locations or forest margins, such as this Coprosma chathamica

The species is endemic to New Zealand, currently only known to occur in New Zealand in the Chatham Islands, though is likely present in other locations. The species primarily grows on the bark of a variety of plants, primarily on Olearia traversiorum and Coprosma chathamica, and is also found on Muehlenbeckia, Melicytus chathamicus, Myrsine chathamica, Dracophyllum arboreum, Cordyline australis and Plagianthus regius subsp. chathamicus.

== Ecology ==
The species is strictly corticolous (growing on bark) and photophilous, preferring to live on isolated trees exposed to the sun, or trees and shrubs found on forest margins. The species is tolerant to strong wind, and can be the dominant crustose lichen present in wind-swept open areas of the Chatham Islands, such as coastal margins and open dunes.

== Gallery ==
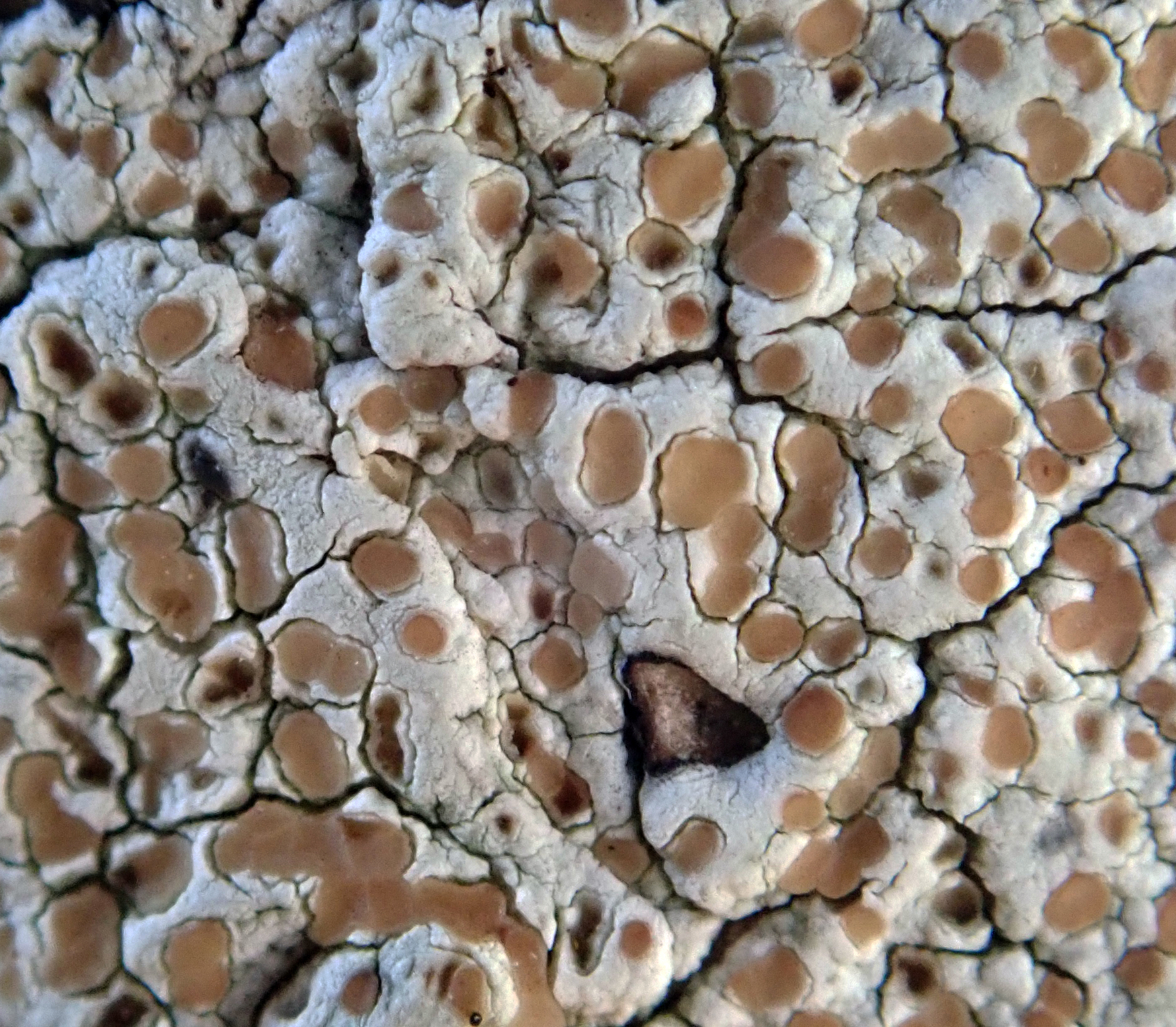

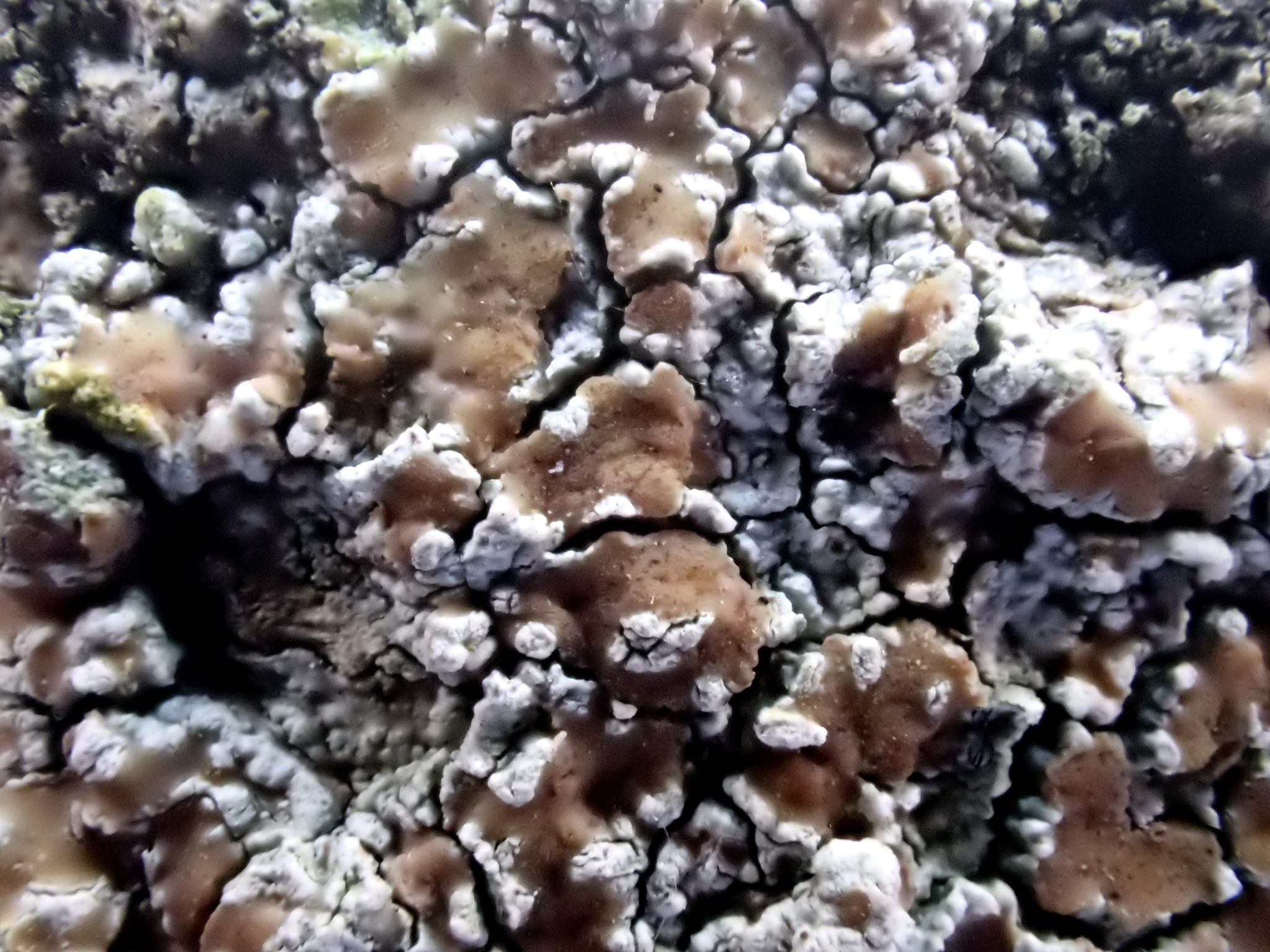

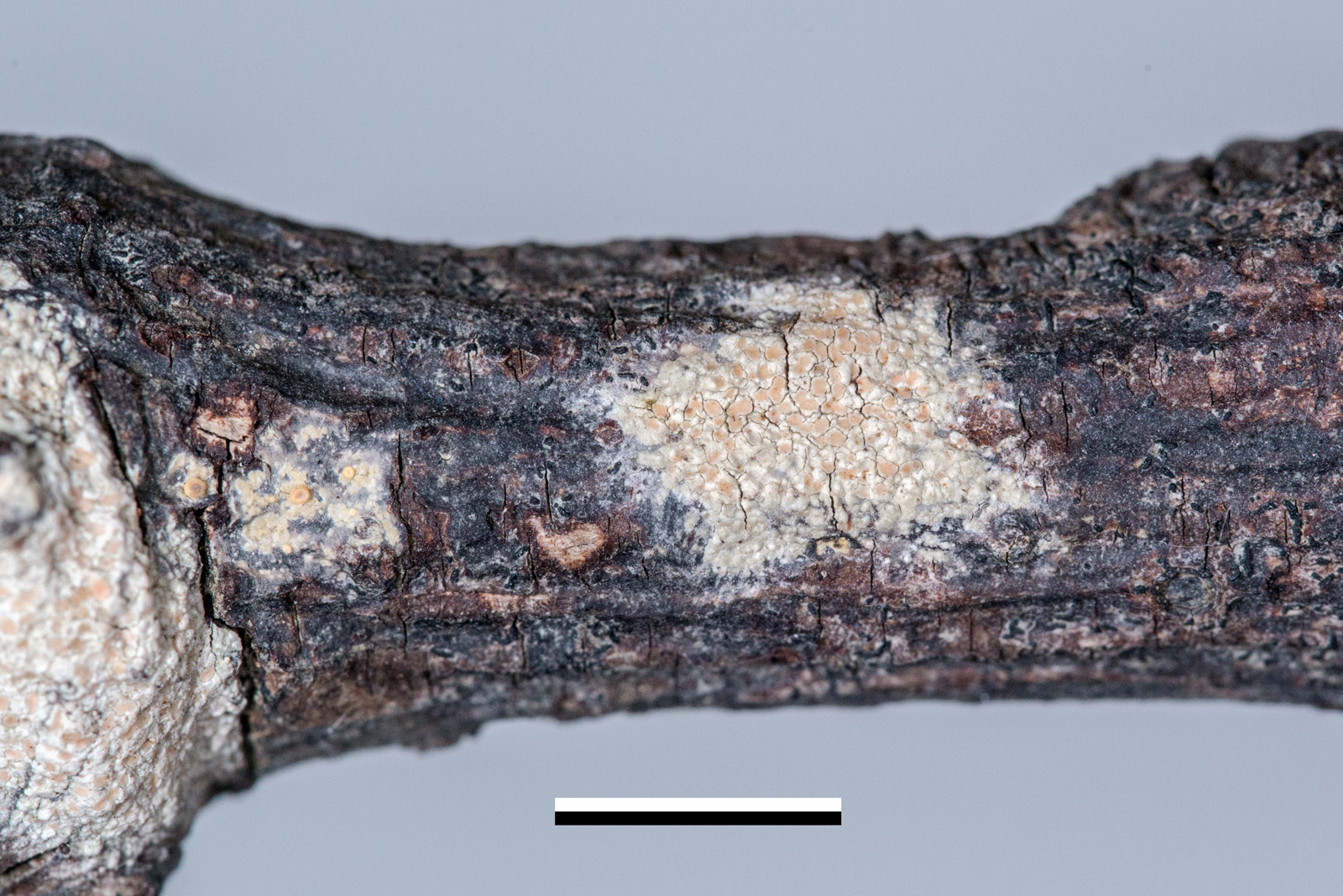

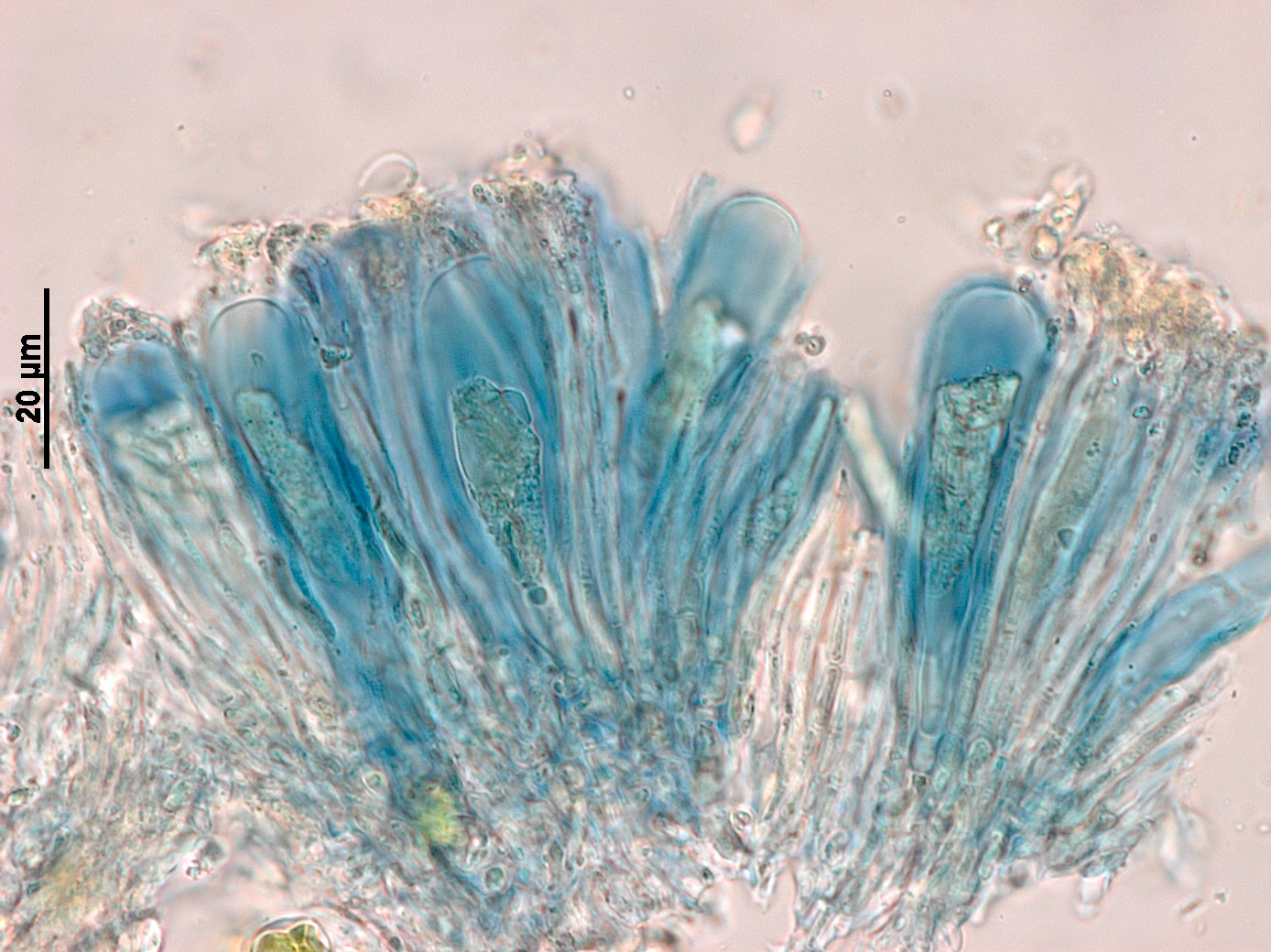

== See also ==
- List of Lecanora species
