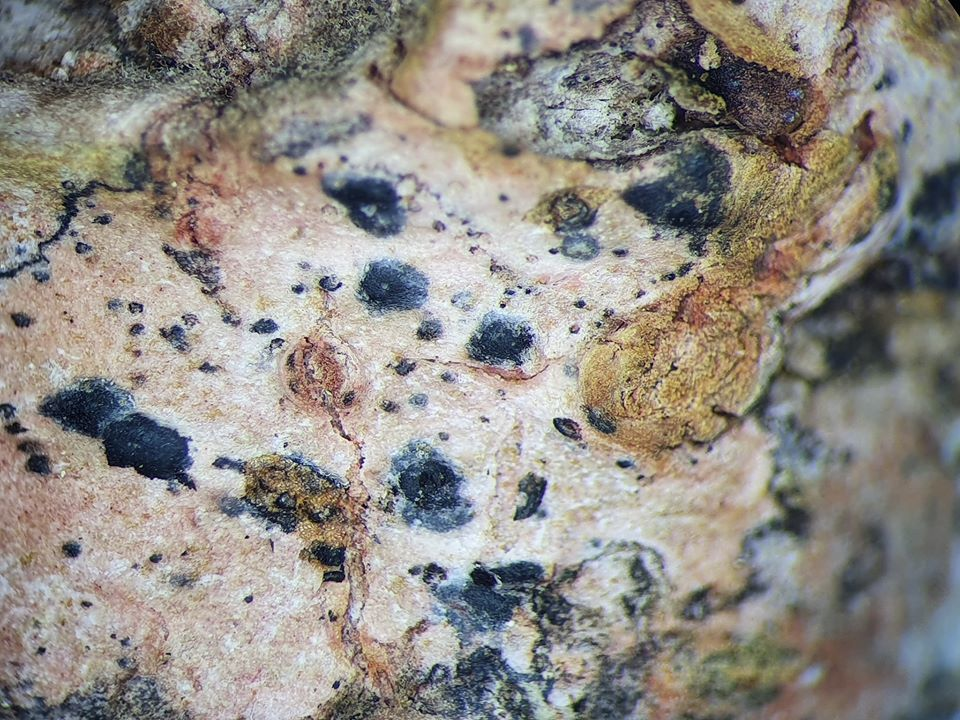
- On bark of Coprosma chathamica

Scientific classification
- Kingdom: Fungi
- Division: Ascomycota
- Class: Eurotiomycetes
- Order: Pyrenulales
- Family: Pyrenulaceae
- Genus: Pyrenula
- Species: P. solomonii

Binomial name
- Pyrenula solomonii A.J. Marshall, de Lange, Blanchon & Aptroot

= Pyrenula solomonii =

Species of lichen

Pyrenula solomonii is a species of lichen in the family Pyrenulaceae. It was first described in 2025 by Andrew J. Marshall, Peter de Lange, Dan Blanchon and André Aptroot. Endemic to the Chatham Islands of New Zealand and easily identifiable by its pink colour when fresh, the species is currently only known to grow on the bark of a single Coprosma chathamica tree.

== Description ==
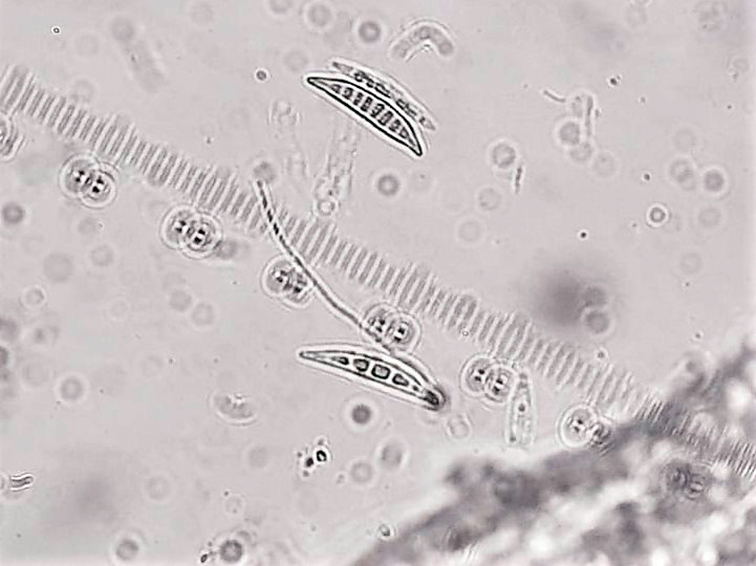
Photomicrograph of spores

The species grows on bark, has a crustose thallus, no pseudocyphellae, and is pink to pinkish-grey in colour, which fades to either a pale pink or beige/orange when stored. The surface is minutely rugose. The protothallus is black, and the species' photobiont are green. The lichen's ascomata range from being either solitary or crowded, and are particularly immersed in the species' thallus. It can be distinguished from other members of Pyrenula due to its pink thallus, flattened ascomata that are largely immersed in the substratum, and by its 7–10 transversely septate ascospores, which range in size between 37 μm (0.0015 in) by 6 μm (0.00024 in) and 52 μm (0.0020 in) by 8.5 μm (0.00033 in).

== Taxonomy ==
The species was first described by Andrew J. Marshall, Peter de Lange, Dan Blanchon and André Aptroot in 2025. The species was named after Māui Solomon, Moriori indigenous rights advocate and grandson of Tommy Solomon. The holotype is held by the Unitec Institute of Technology herbarium.

== Ecology ==
Pyrenula solomonii grows in less exposed, partially shaded conditions, and alongside an unidentified species of Arthonia lichen.

== Distribution and habitat ==
The species is endemic to New Zealand, found in the Chatham Islands. It is known to live on a single Coprosma chathamica tree in the Nikau Bush Conservation Area; dedicated surveys of the Chatham Islands held between 2020 and 2025 to search for additional specimens of the lichen found no other examples. As the tree is in the process of becoming shaded by surrounding Corynocarpus laevigatus trees, the species may be at critical risk of extinction.
