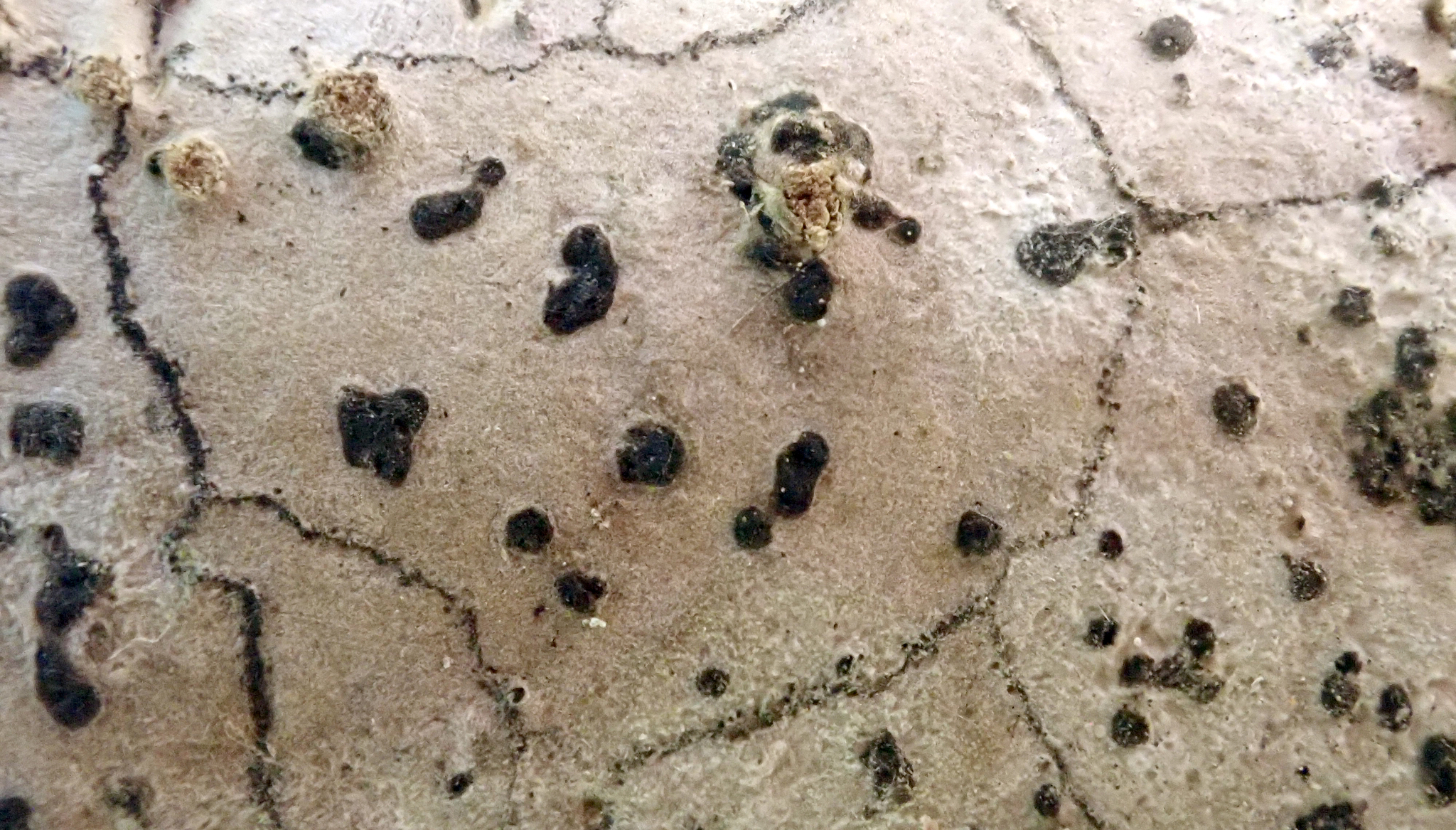

Scientific classification
- Kingdom: Fungi
- Division: Ascomycota
- Class: Eurotiomycetes
- Order: Pyrenulales
- Family: Pyrenulaceae
- Genus: Pyrenula
- Species: P. quadratolocularis

Binomial name
- Pyrenula quadratolocularis A.J. Marshall, de Lange, Blanchon & Aptroot

= Pyrenula quadratolocularis =

Species of lichen

Pyrenula quadratolocularis is a species of lichen in the family Pyrenulaceae. It was first described in 2025 by Andrew J. Marshall, Peter de Lange, Dan Blanchon and André Aptroot. Endemic to the Chatham Islands of New Zealand, the species is typically found growing on Coprosma chathamica and Coprosma propinqua, on bark exposed to the elements.

== Description ==
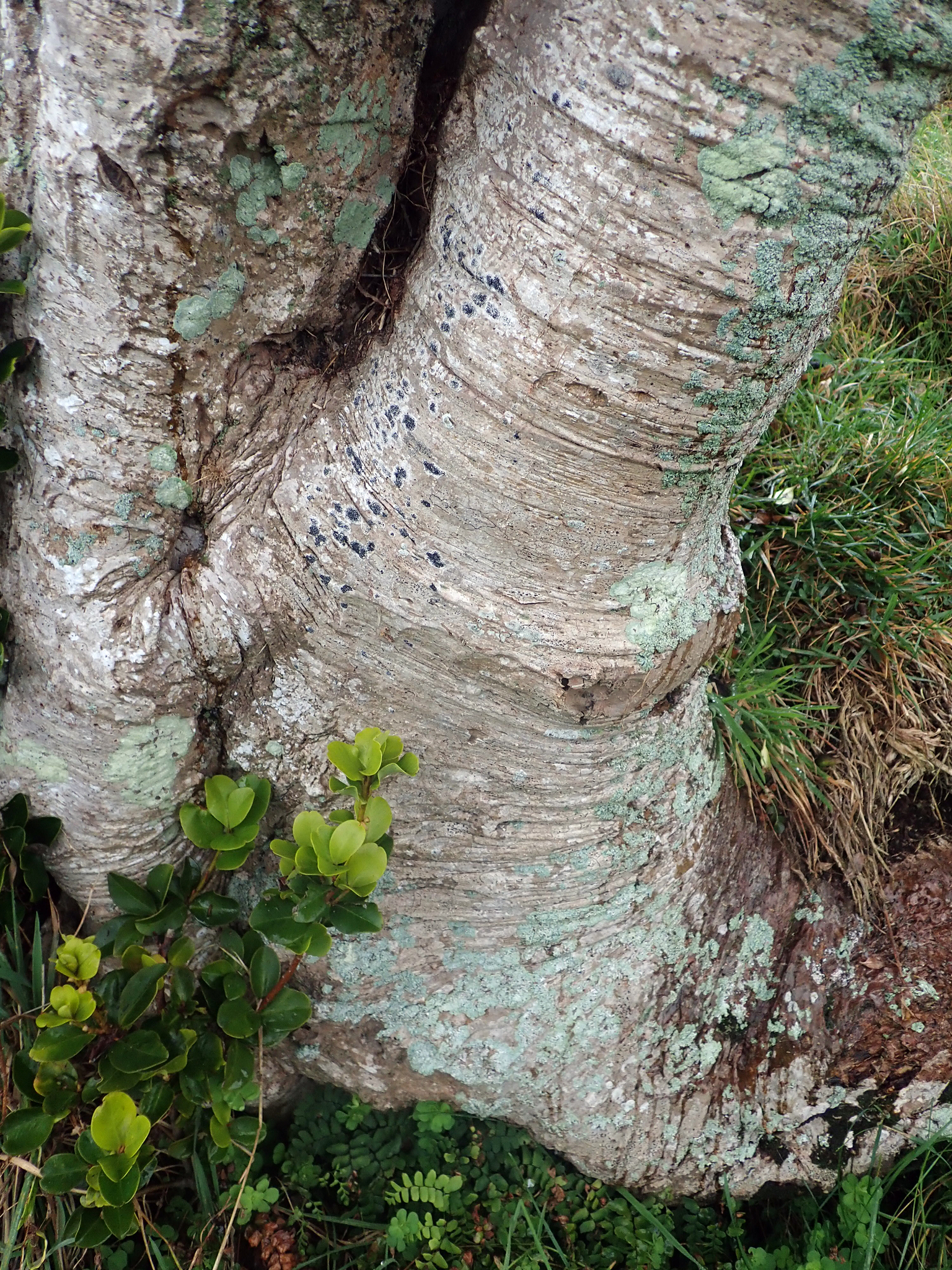
On trunk of Coprosma chathamica tree

The species is corticolous, has a crustose thallus, no pseudocyphellae, and is grey-white in colour, which fades to light brown or tan when stored. It can be distinguished from other members of Pyrenula due to its aggregated ascomata which are typically immersed in the thallus, curved ascospores, and square locules which range in size between 38 μm (0.0015 in) by 12 μm (0.00047 in) and 45 μm (0.0018 in) by 15 μm (0.00059 in).

== Taxonomy ==
The species was first described by Andrew J. Marshall, Peter de Lange, Dan Blanchon and André Aptroot in 2025. The species epithet was chosen due to species having spore locules which appear square when viewed under a microscope. The holotype is held by the Unitec Institute of Technology herbarium.

== Distribution and habitat ==
The species is endemic to New Zealand, found in the Chatham Islands. Pyrenula quadratolocularis is typically found on isolated trees exposed to the ocean, as well as forest remnants surrounding Te Whanga Lagoon and Lake Huro on Chatham Island. It has been found growing on Coprosma chathamica and Coprosma propinqua, usually on the most exposed surfaces of the trunks.
