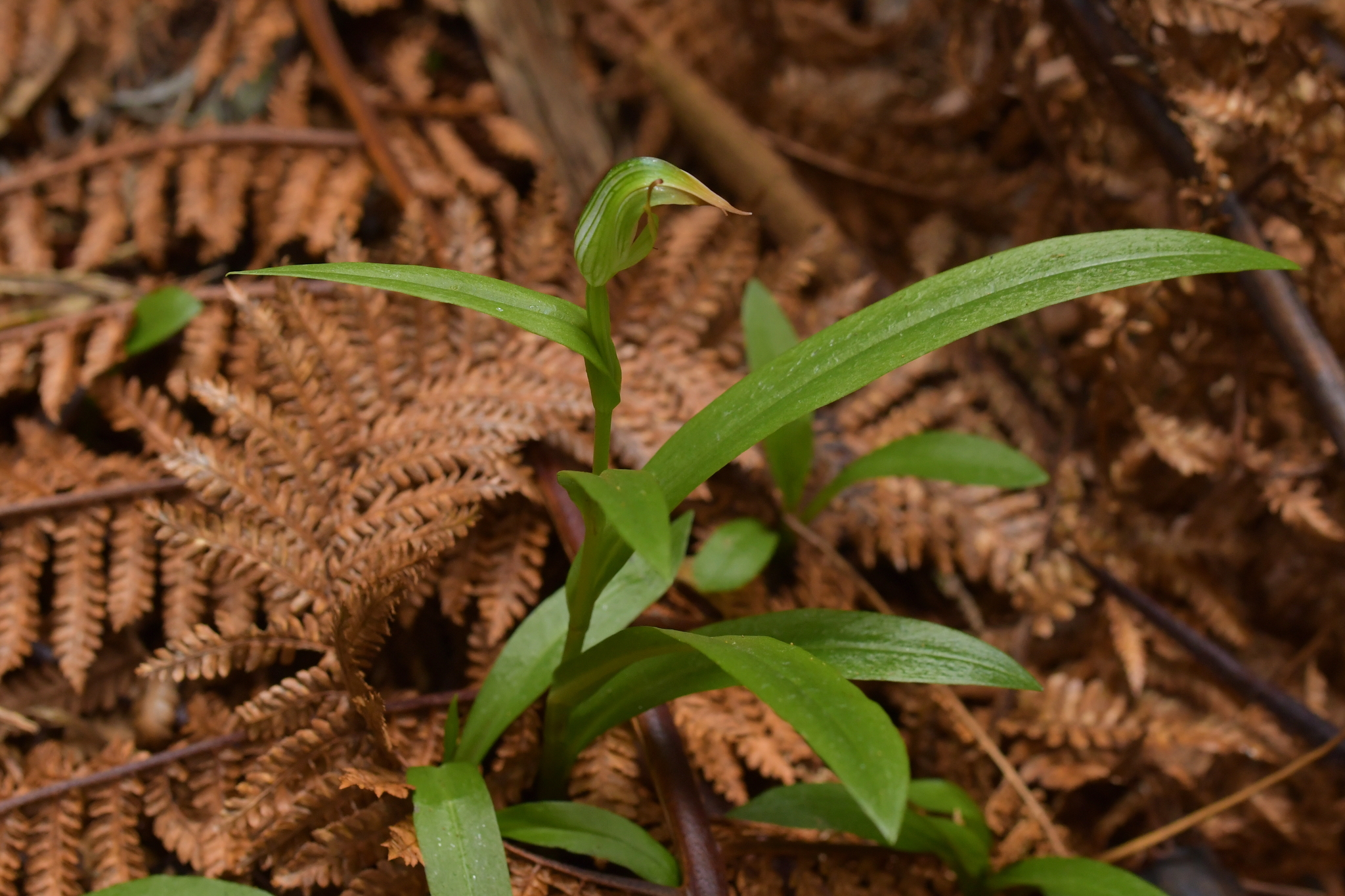

Scientific classification
- Kingdom: Plantae
- Clade: Tracheophytes
- Clade: Angiosperms
- Clade: Monocots
- Order: Asparagales
- Family: Orchidaceae
- Subfamily: Orchidoideae
- Tribe: Cranichideae
- Genus: Pterostylis
- Species: P. silvicultrix

Binomial name
- Pterostylis silvicultrix (F.Muell.) Molloy, D.L.Jones & M.A.Clem.

Synonyms
- Pterostylis banksii var. silvicultrix F.Muell.

= Pterostylis silvicultrix =

Species of orchid

Pterostylis silvicultrix, commonly known as the Chatham Island greenhood or tutukiwi, is a species of orchid which is endemic to Chatham Island and nearby islands. Non-flowering plants have a rosette of leaves but flowering plants have leaves on the flowering stem, some of which reach above the single translucent white flower with dark green stripes. It is similar to Pterostylis banksii which occurs on both of the main islands of New Zealand but that species lacks the orange or reddish-brown tips on the flowers of this species.

== Description ==
Pterostylis silvicultrix is a terrestrial, perennial, deciduous, herb with an underground tuber and which often grows in colonies. Non-flowering plants have light green, elliptic to lance-shaped leaves which are 30–80 mm (1–3 in) long and 10–20 mm (0.4–0.8 in) wide on a stem 20–150 mm (0.8–6 in) tall. Flowering plants have between three and six leaves 40–150 mm (2–6 in) long, 1–22 mm (0.04–0.9 in) wide with their bases wrapped around the flowering stem. A single erect, translucent white flower with dark green stripes and a reddish-brown tip is borne on a flowering stem 100–680 mm (4–30 in) tall. The flower is 18–25 mm (0.7–1 in) long. The dorsal sepal and petals are fused, forming a hood or "galea" over the column. The dorsal sepal is 20–25 mm (0.8–1 in) long, 10–16 mm (0.4–0.6 in) wide, slightly longer than the petals and tapered towards the tip. The lateral sepals are erect, there is a wide gap between them and the galea and they are joined at the base to close off part of the front of the flower. The lateral sepals taper suddenly to narrow tips 8–10 mm (0.3–0.4 in) and there is a broad, sloping, V-shaped sinus between them. The labellum is erect and green and protrudes through the sinus. Flowering occurs in November and December.

== Taxonomy and naming ==
This greenhood was first formally described in 1864 by Ferdinand von Mueller who gave it the name Pterostylis banksii var. silvicultrix and published the description in The Vegetation of the Chatham-Islands. In 2002, Brian Molloy, David Jones and Mark Clements raised the variety to species status.

== Distribution and habitat ==
Pterostylis silvicultrix is widespread in forests, near streams, bogs and wetland margins, often growing on the trunks of tree ferns. It is found on Chatham, Pitt, Mangere and South East Islands.
