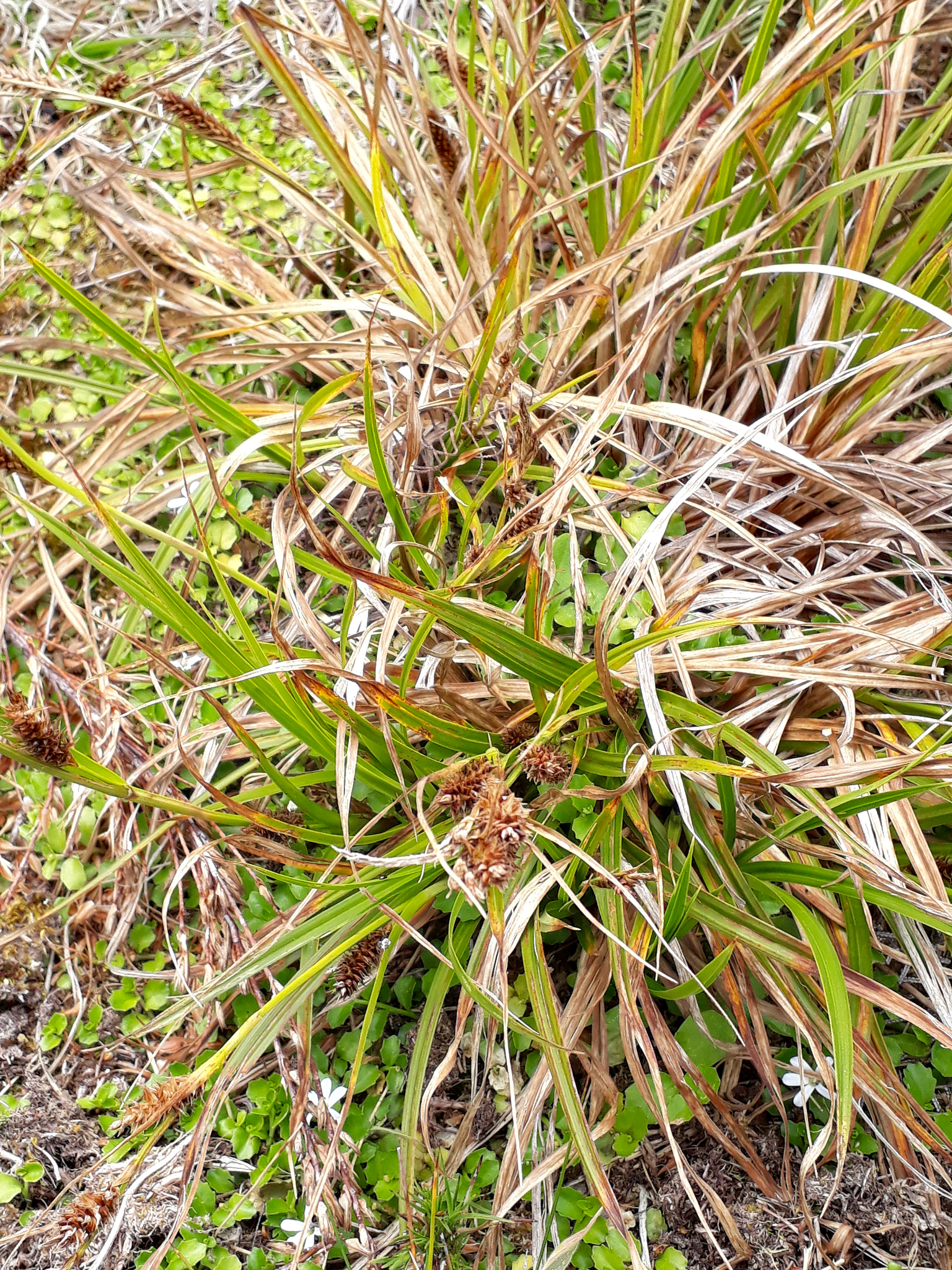

Scientific classification
- Kingdom: Plantae
- Clade: Tracheophytes
- Clade: Angiosperms
- Clade: Monocots
- Clade: Commelinids
- Order: Poales
- Family: Cyperaceae
- Genus: Carex
- Species: C. chathamica

Binomial name
- Carex chathamica Petrie

= Carex chathamica =

Species of flowering plant

Carex chathamica is a species of sedge in the family Cyperaceae, native to the Chatham Islands of New Zealand. Grey-backed storm petrels (Garrodia nereis) nest in its tufts.
