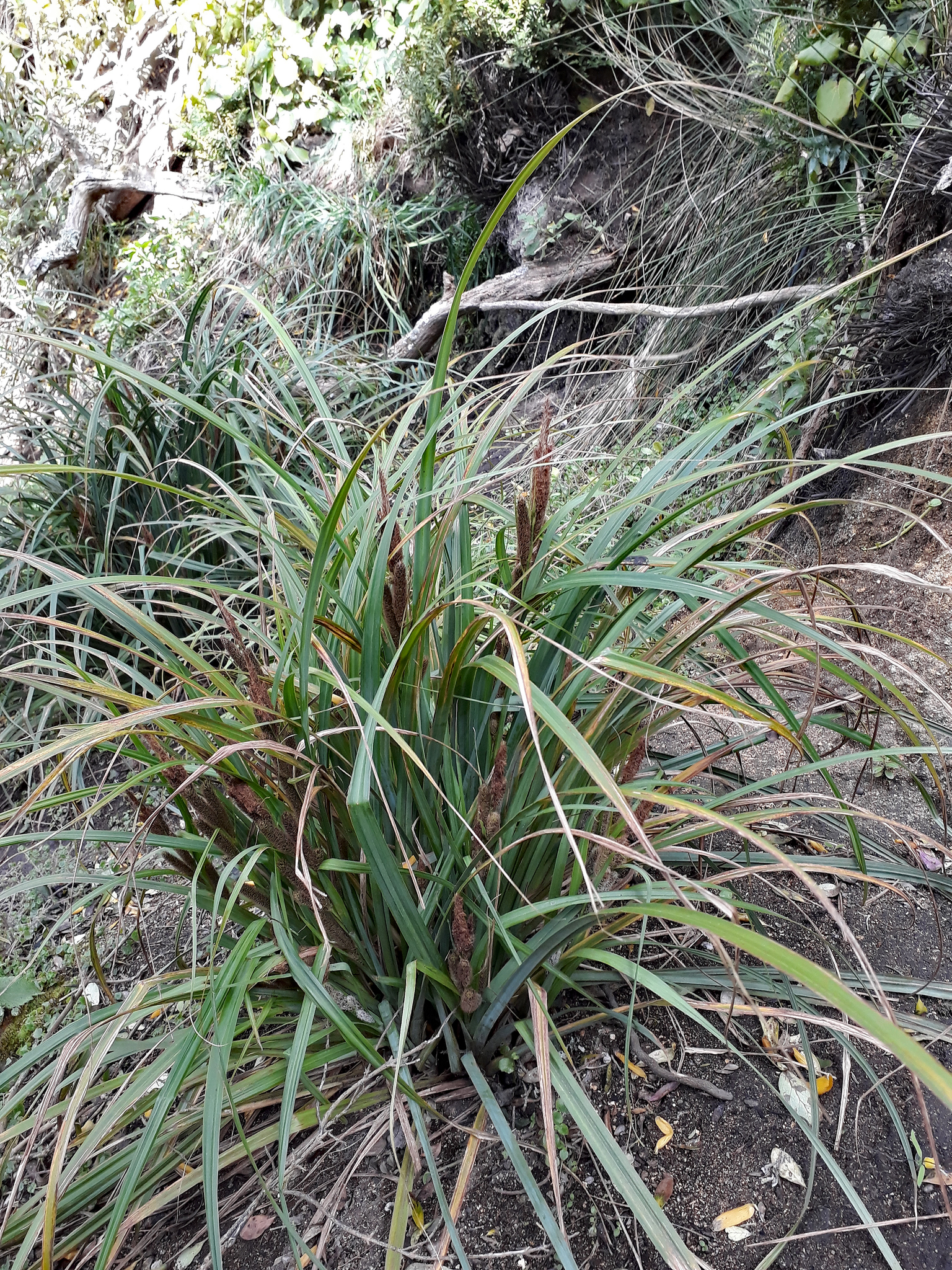

Scientific classification
- Kingdom: Plantae
- Clade: Tracheophytes
- Clade: Angiosperms
- Clade: Monocots
- Clade: Commelinids
- Order: Poales
- Family: Cyperaceae
- Genus: Carex
- Species: C. ventosa

Binomial name
- Carex ventosa C.B.Clarke

= Carex ventosa =

Species of sedge

Carex ventosa, also known as Chatham Islands forest sedge, is a tussock-forming species of perennial sedge in the family Cyperaceae. It is native to the Chatham Islands.

== Description ==
The sedge has a stout and quite leafy habit with a short and erect rhizome typically with a width of about 20 mm (0.79 in) and is found to grow mostly in well drained soils. It has smooth culms that can be scabrous below the inflorescence. The culms have a triangular cross-section and a length that is usually 0.45 to 1 m (1 ft 6 in to 3 ft 3 in) but can be as long as 1.5 m (4 ft 11 in) and a width of 1 to 4 mm (0.039 to 0.157 in) and are surrounded at the base by drown coloured sheaths. The pale green to light grey-green double folded leaves are usually as long as or slightly longer than the culms and have a width of 5 to 11 mm (0.20 to 0.43 in) and have rough margins. The inflorescences contain 7 to 15 spikes and are 0.2 to 1 mm (0.0079 to 0.0394 in) in length.

== Taxonomy ==
It was described by the botanist Charles Baron Clarke in 1906 as a part of the work Manual of the New Zealand Flora. The type specimen was collected by Henry Travers from Chatman Island. It has only one synonym; Carex mcclurgii as described by Petrie.

== Distribution ==
The species is endemic to the Chatham Islands, and is found on Chatham Island, Pitt Island, Mangere Island, Little Mangere Island, Star Keys, Rabbit Island and Rangatira Island. It is widespread throughout the areas of lowland forest on the islands usually associated with areas of coastland forest, tall scrub and dune forest and is rarely found in areas of deep peat.

== See also ==
- List of Carex species
