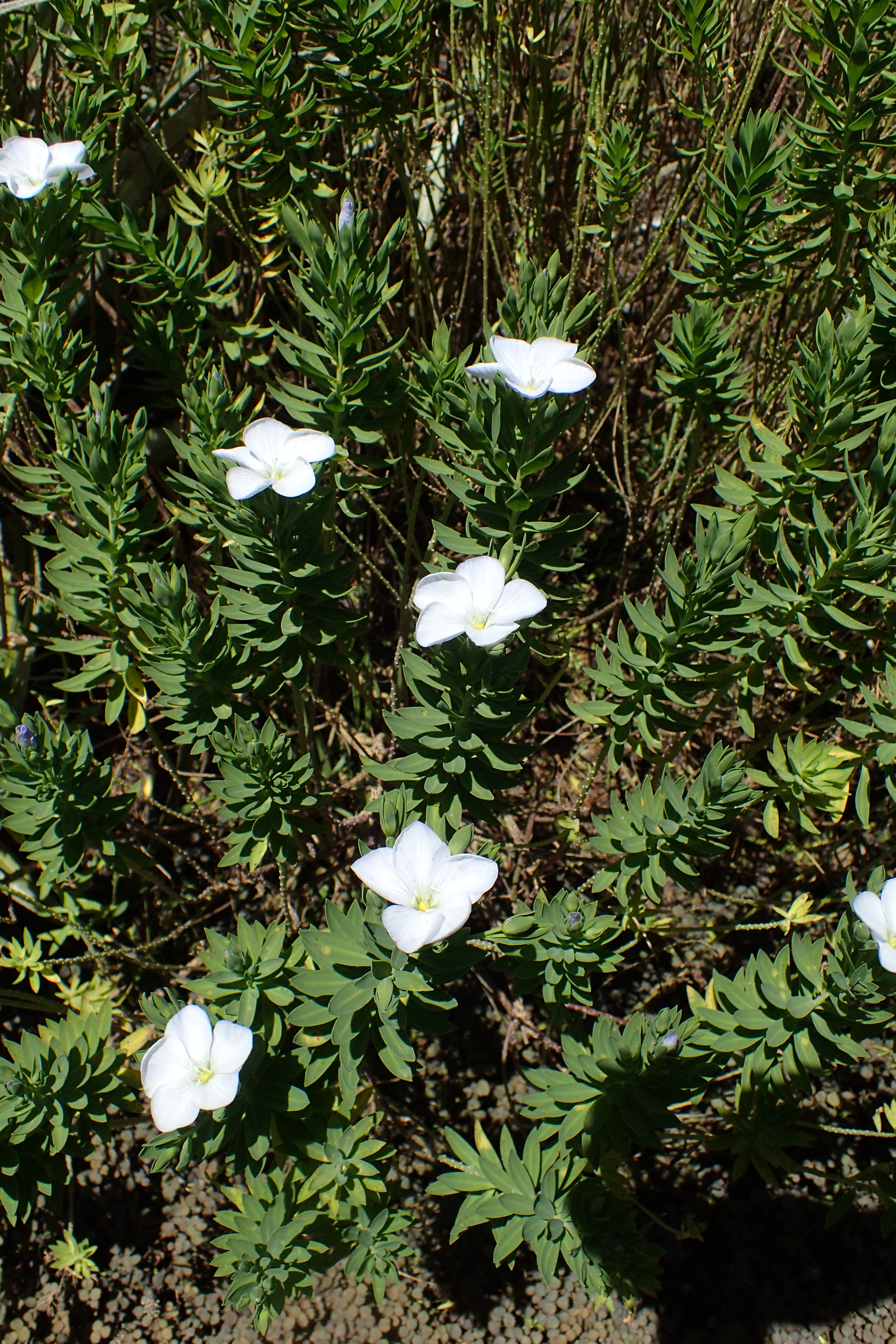
- Linum monogynum var. chathamicum

Scientific classification
- Kingdom: Plantae
- Clade: Tracheophytes
- Clade: Angiosperms
- Clade: Eudicots
- Clade: Rosids
- Order: Malpighiales
- Family: Linaceae
- Genus: Linum
- Species: L. monogynum

Binomial name
- Linum monogynum G.Forst.

= Linum monogynum =

Species of flowering plant

Linum monogynum, the rauhuia or New Zealand linen flax, is a species of flowering plant in the family Linaceae, which is endemic to New Zealand. It is a low-growing short-lived perennial or woody subshrub, growing up to 16 in (41 cm) tall. Its spear-shaped, leathery-gray to green leaves are 0.2–1 inches (5–25 mm) long. Its pretty white flowers are up to 1 in (2.5 cm) in diameter, and have five overlapping petals. It is monoecious, having both male and female organs on one plant (hence the Latin specific epithet monogynum, literally "single wife").

Separate populations on Chatham Island are more robust with blue-white flowers, and may be referred to as L. monogynum var. chathamicum. There may also be variations amongst the mainland populations.

This tough compact plant is well able to cope with the harsh conditions of New Zealand's coasts, often with gale-force salt-laden winds. It is a close relative to the true flax of the Northern Hemisphere, Linum usitatissimum, but is not closely related to the much better-known plants called New Zealand flax (species in the genus Phormium).
