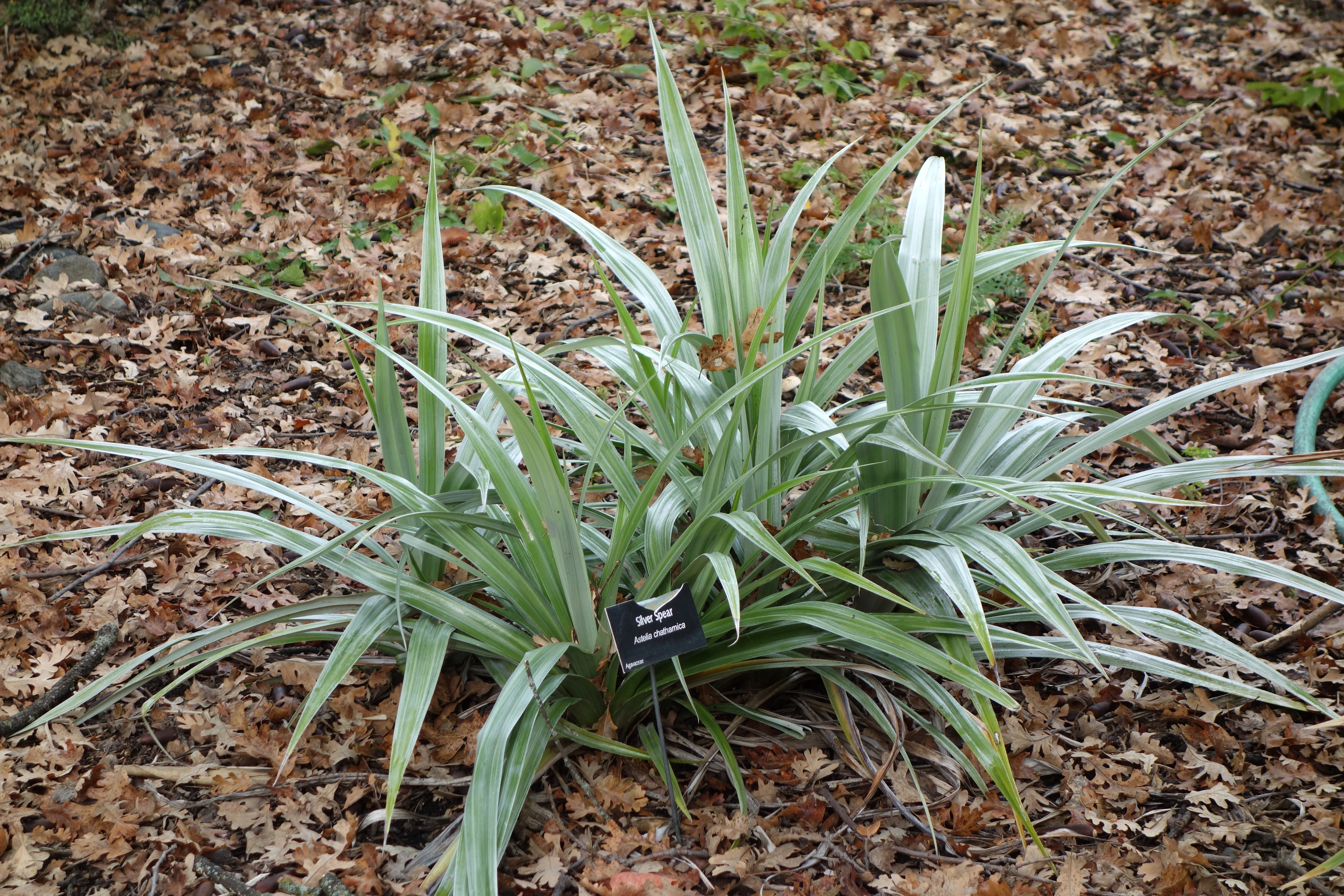

Scientific classification
- Kingdom: Plantae
- Clade: Tracheophytes
- Clade: Angiosperms
- Clade: Monocots
- Order: Asparagales
- Family: Asteliaceae
- Genus: Astelia
- Species: A. chathamica

Binomial name
- Astelia chathamica (Skottsb.) L.B.Moore

= Astelia chathamica =

Species of flowering plant

Astelia chathamica, commonly known as the Chatham Islands kakaha, Moriori flax, or silver spear, is a species of flowering plant in the recently named family Asteliaceae. It is an evergreen silver-green perennial from the Chatham Islands of New Zealand, growing to about 1.2 m (4 ft) tall. Forming a large clump of sword-shaped leaves, it produces small green flowers and red berries (the latter only on the female plant). It grows best in partial shade and in fertile and well-drained soil with moderate water. The plant is hardy down to −3 °C (27 °F), but the foliage may be damaged by frost, so in colder areas the plant may require some winter protection.

In cultivation in the UK, this plant has gained the Royal Horticultural Society's Award of Garden Merit.
