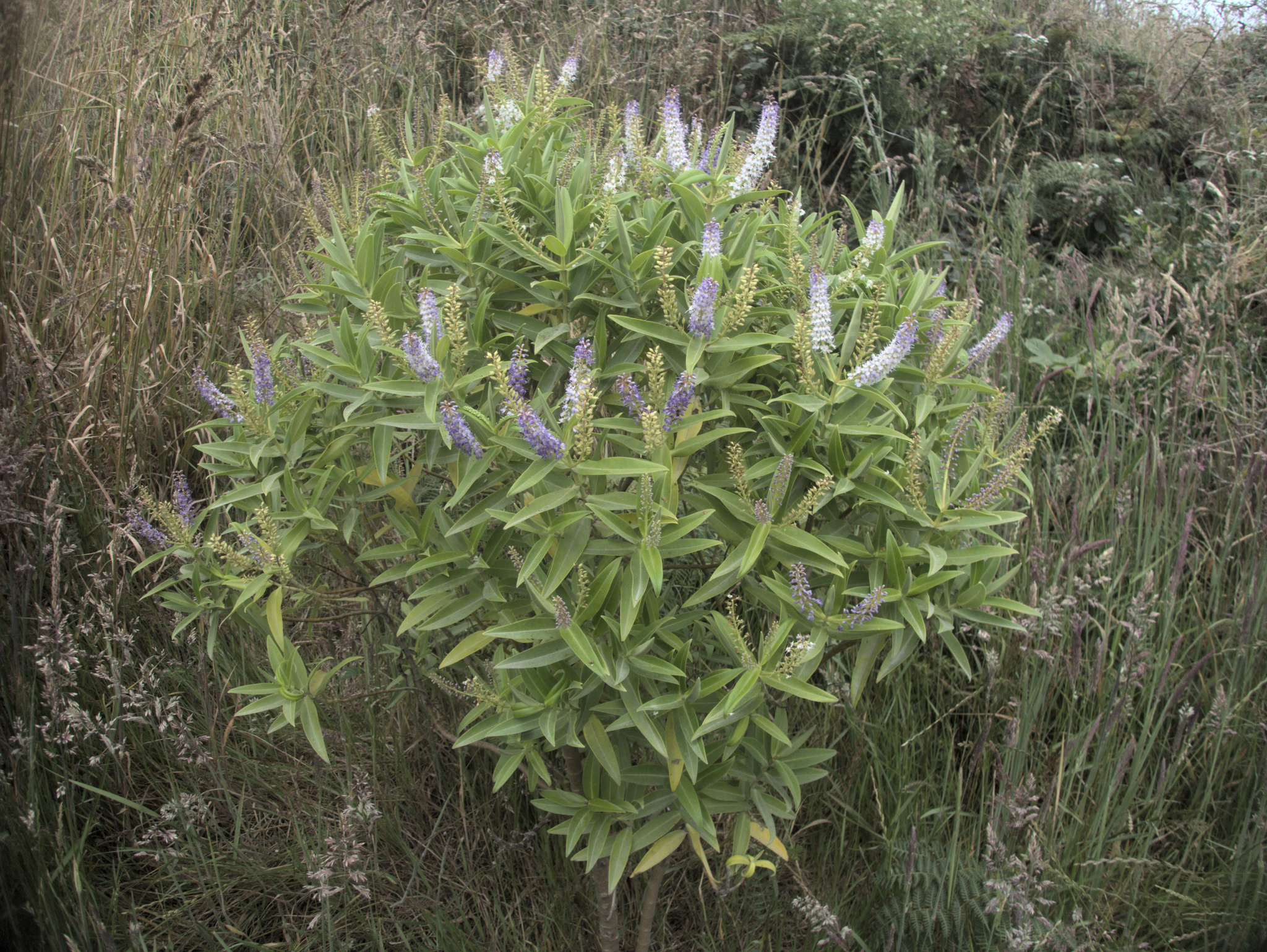

Conservation status
- Vulnerable (IUCN 2.3)

Scientific classification
- Kingdom: Plantae
- Clade: Tracheophytes
- Clade: Angiosperms
- Clade: Eudicots
- Clade: Asterids
- Order: Lamiales
- Family: Plantaginaceae
- Genus: Veronica
- Section: Veronica sect. Hebe
- Species: V. barkeri

Binomial name
- Veronica barkeri Cockayne

Synonyms
- Hebe barkeri (Cockayne) A.Wall Hebe gigantea; (Cockayne) Cockayne & Allan Veronica gigantea Cockayne

= Veronica barkeri =

Species of flowering plant

Veronica barkeri, synonym Hebe barkeri, is a species of plant in the family Plantaginaceae. It is endemic to the Chatham Islands. It is threatened by habitat loss. It was featured as Critter of the Week by Radio New Zealand on 17 May 2019.
