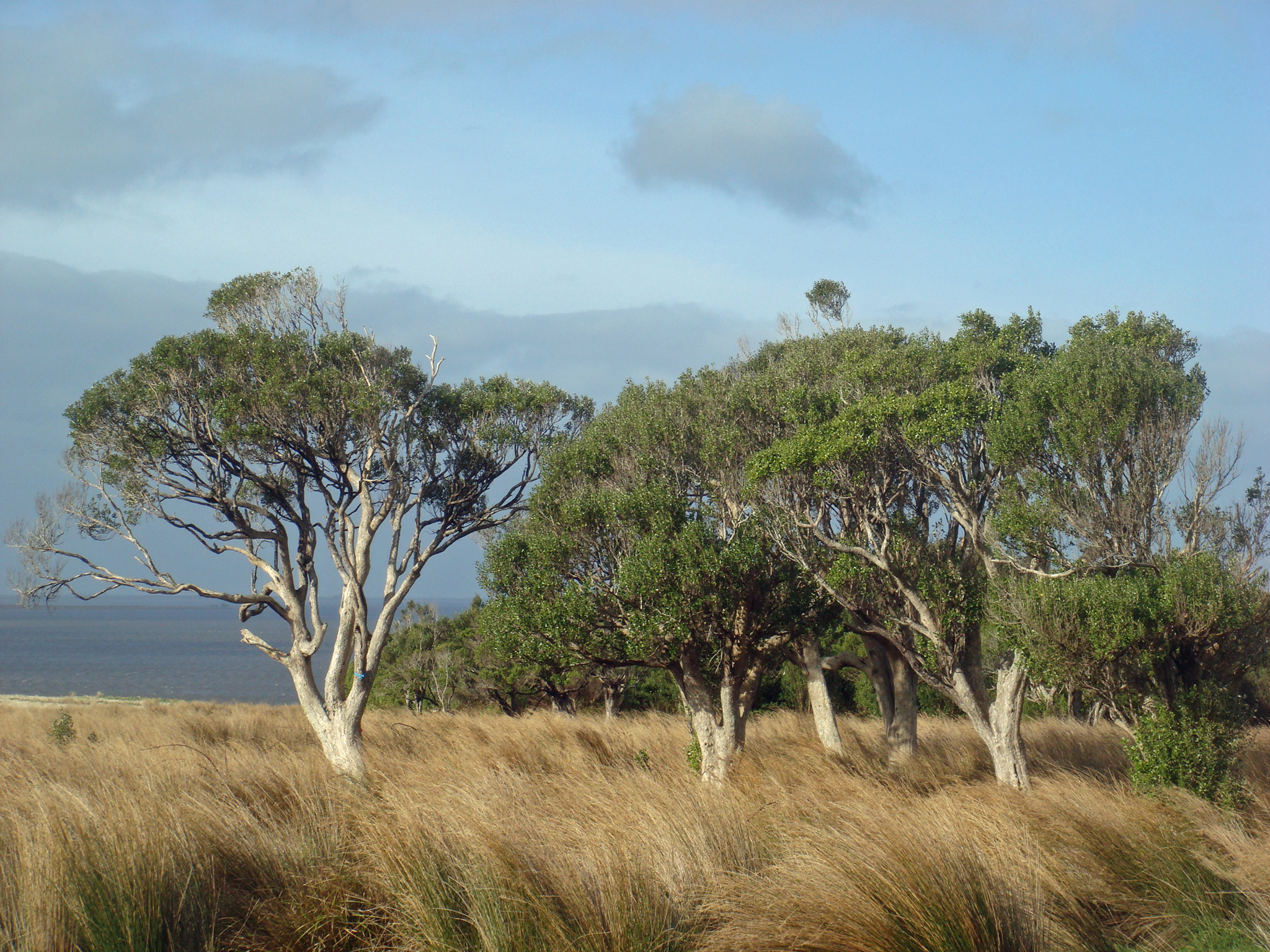

Scientific classification
- Kingdom: Plantae
- Clade: Tracheophytes
- Clade: Angiosperms
- Clade: Eudicots
- Clade: Asterids
- Order: Asterales
- Family: Asteraceae
- Genus: Olearia
- Species: O. telmatica

Binomial name
- Olearia telmatica Heenan et de Lange

= Olearia telmatica =

Species of flowering plant

Olearia telmatica, commonly known as akeake, is a species of flowering plant in the family Asteraceae native to the Chatham Islands of New Zealand.
