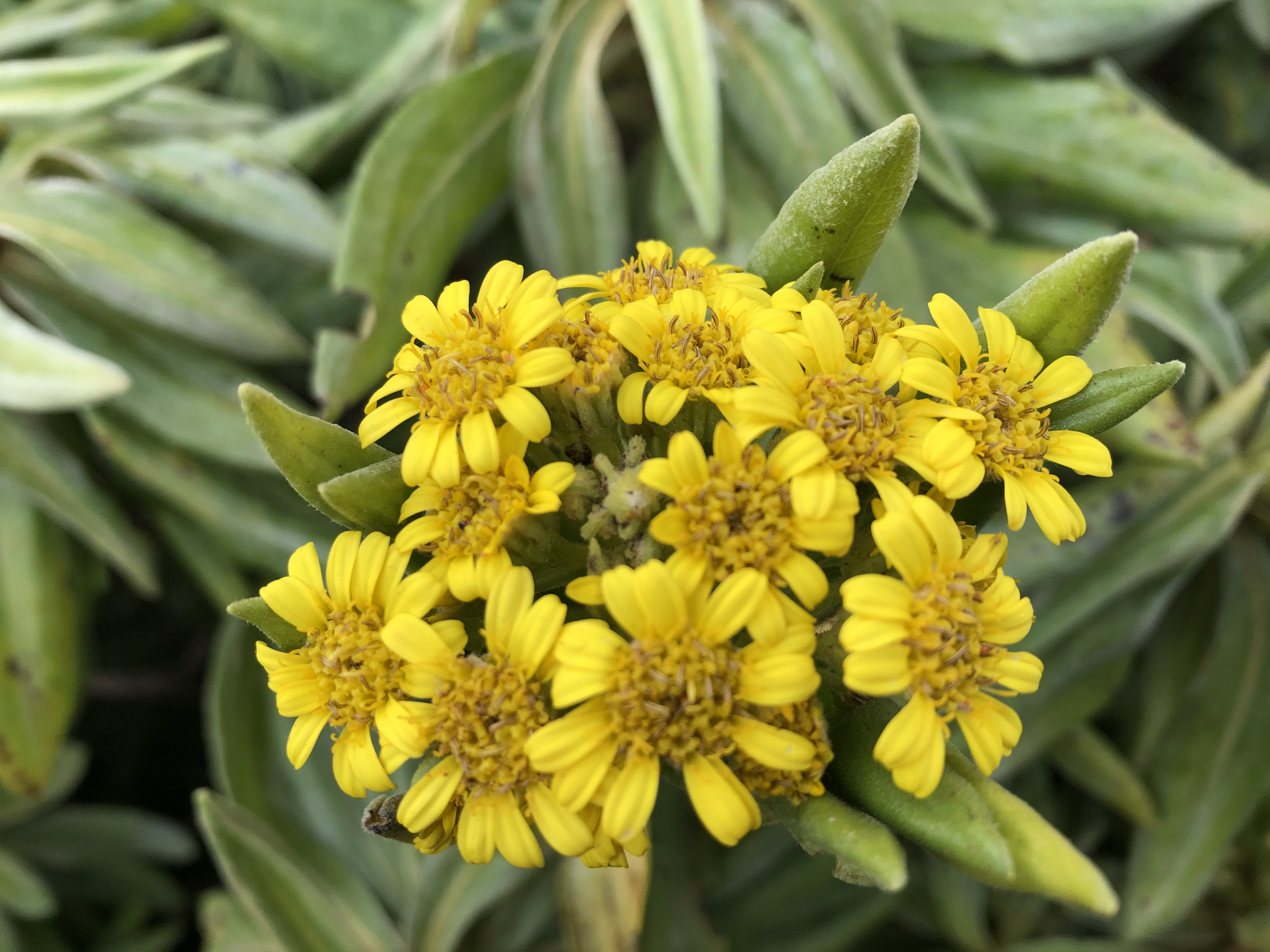

Conservation status
- Endangered (IUCN 3.1)

- Nationally Vulnerable (NZ TCS)

Scientific classification
- Kingdom: Plantae
- Clade: Tracheophytes
- Clade: Angiosperms
- Clade: Eudicots
- Clade: Asterids
- Order: Asterales
- Family: Asteraceae
- Genus: Brachyglottis
- Species: B. huntii

Binomial name
- Brachyglottis huntii (Muell.) B. Nord.

Synonyms
- Senecio huntii F. Muell.

= Brachyglottis huntii =

Species of flowering plant

Brachyglottis huntii, commonly called rautini or Chatham Island Christmas tree, is a species of flowering plant in the family Asteraceae. It is found only on the Chatham Islands in New Zealand.

== Description ==
Brachyglottis huntii grows up to 8 meters tall in height, with leaves that grow up to 12 centimetres long. It is covered in down-like hairs which give an overall silvery hue. Coming into flower in the summer season, from November to February, it produces distinctive bright yellow flowers. Seeds are produced during the autumn season.

Brachyglottis huntii has grey bark which flakes off in small shards when disturbed. Leaves are finely toothed in the upper third section. Branches are short, stout and spreading, and often bear multiple leaf scars. Leaves are aromatic and initially are covered in short matted hairs on both sides before becoming relatively hairless with age.

It contains the pyrrolizidine alkaloids senkirkine and retrorsine, which are both acutely toxic when consumed orally.

== Habitat ==
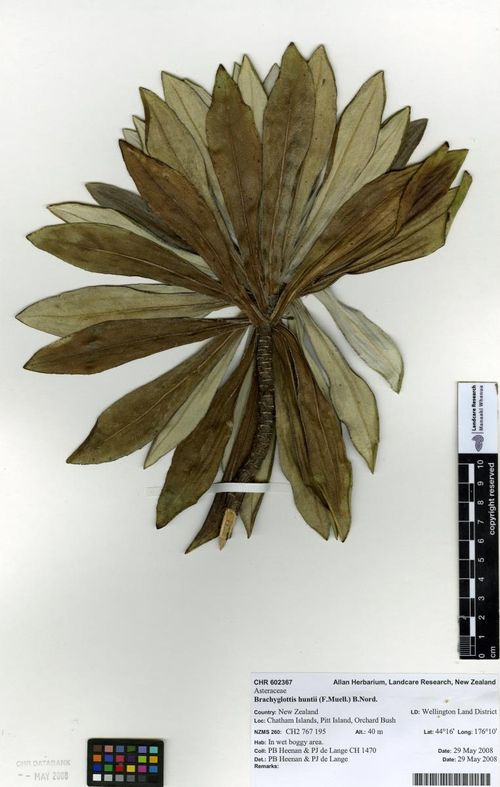
Herbarium specimen from Pitt Island held at the Allan herbarium.

Distribution is restricted on Chatham Island in the past century due to grazing threats and habitat destruction. On Pitt Island, it is more widely spread due to lower numbers of grazing or feral stock animals.

Brachyglottis huntii prefers disturbed regions, or those in the early successional ecological stages. These areas include along streams and riversides, drier swamps, open shrublands and along open ridges. This species is unable to cope with prolonged periods of drought or heavily shaded areas.

== Threats ==
Brachyglottis huntii is palatable to stock animals in younger forms, and considerable damage has been noted from both browsing and trampling. Habitat destruction also poses a considerable threat to the range of this species. Recently, cases have been noted of the collapse of healthy trees. Soil borne pathogens such as phytophora and verticillium wilt have been implicated, with future research being needed.
