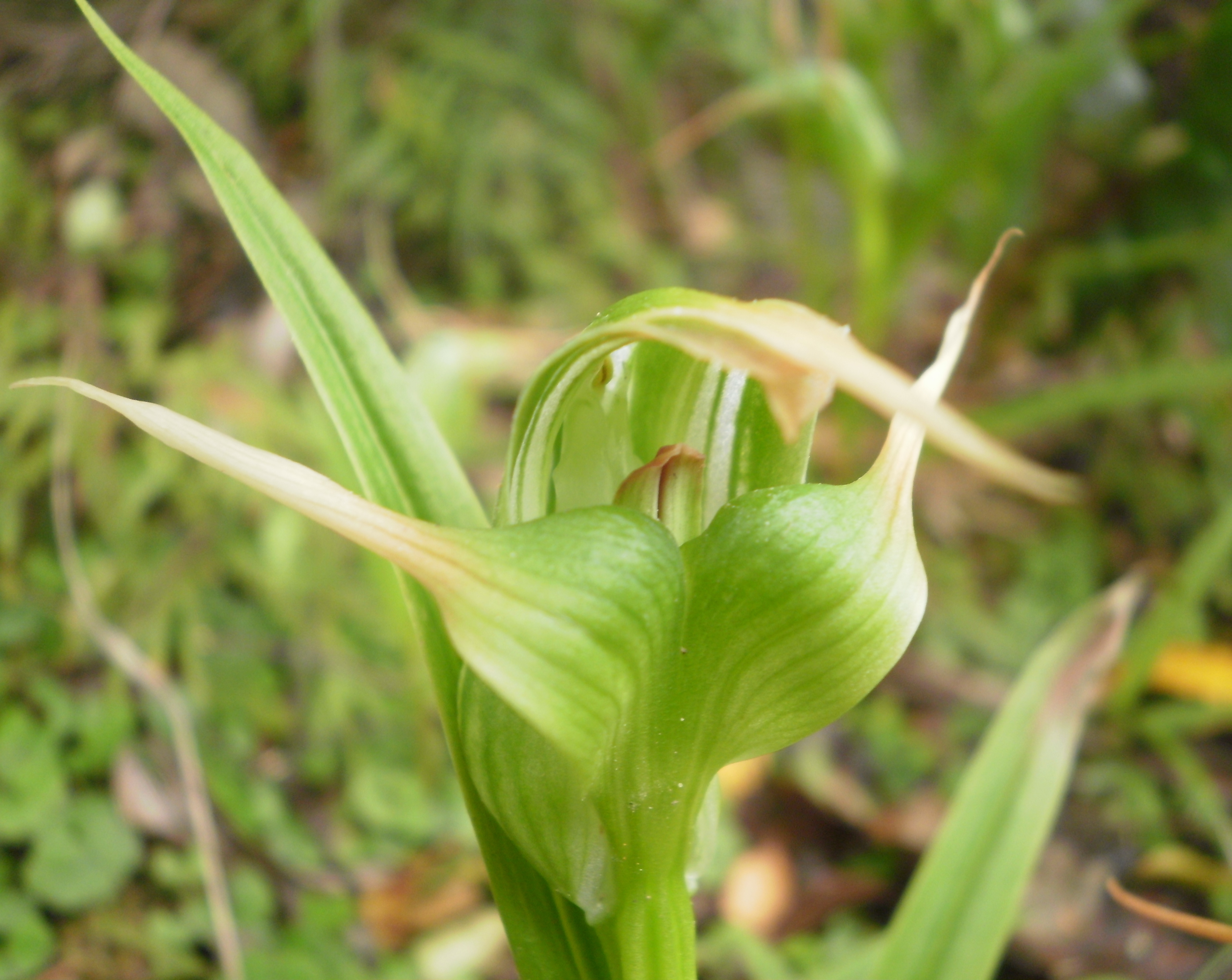
- Pterostylis banksii growing in Upper Hutt

Scientific classification
- Kingdom: Plantae
- Clade: Tracheophytes
- Clade: Angiosperms
- Clade: Monocots
- Order: Asparagales
- Family: Orchidaceae
- Subfamily: Orchidoideae
- Tribe: Cranichideae
- Genus: Pterostylis
- Species: P. banksii

Binomial name
- Pterostylis banksii R.Br. ex A.Cunn.

Synonyms
- Pterostylis emarginata Colenso; Pterostylis speciosa Colenso; Pterostylis subsimilis Colenso

= Pterostylis banksii =

Tutukiwi

Species of orchid

Pterostylis banksii, commonly known as greenhood or tutukiwi, is a species of orchid endemic to New Zealand. Non-flowering plants have a rosette of leaves. Flowering plants have leaves on the flowering stem, some of which reach above the single relatively large, green flower with translucent white stripes. It is the most common, widespread and largest New Zealand greenhood and is found on both of the main islands.

== Description ==
Pterostylis banksii is a terrestrial, perennial, deciduous, herb with an underground tuber and which often grows in colonies. When not flowering there is a rosette of between four and six oblong to broad lance-shaped leaves. Flowering plants have four to six linear to lance-shaped leaves arranged on the flowering stem and varying in shape depending on their position. The leaves are 50–250 mm (2–10 in) long, 10–20 mm (0.4–0.8 in) wide, the uppermost leaf or leaves taller than the top of the flower. The flowering stem is 100–680 mm (4–30 in) tall and there is usually only a single green flower with translucent white stripes. The dorsal sepal and petals are fused, forming a hood or "galea" over the column. The dorsal sepal is 25–50 mm (1–2 in) tall with the top nearly horizontal and tapering to a long narrow tip up to 25 mm (1 in) long. The lateral sepals taper to narrow tips up to 20 mm (0.8 in) long and are erect or turned backwards. The labellum is curved, has a reddish tip and extends above the sinus between the lateral sepals. Flowering occurs from September to December.

== Taxonomy and naming ==
Tutukiwi was first formally described in 1832 by Allan Cunningham who gave it the name Pterostylis macrophylla but he did not publish his manuscript. When Robert Brown was shown Cunningham's drawing of the plant, he recognised it as the same as a specimen in Joseph Banks's collection from James Cook's voyage on the Endeavour. With Cunningham's consent, the plant was named Pterostylis banksii in honour of Banks.

== Distribution and habitat ==
Pterostylis banksii grows in forest and shrubland, including of introduced species. It occurs on both the North and South Islands and on Chatham and Stewart Islands.
