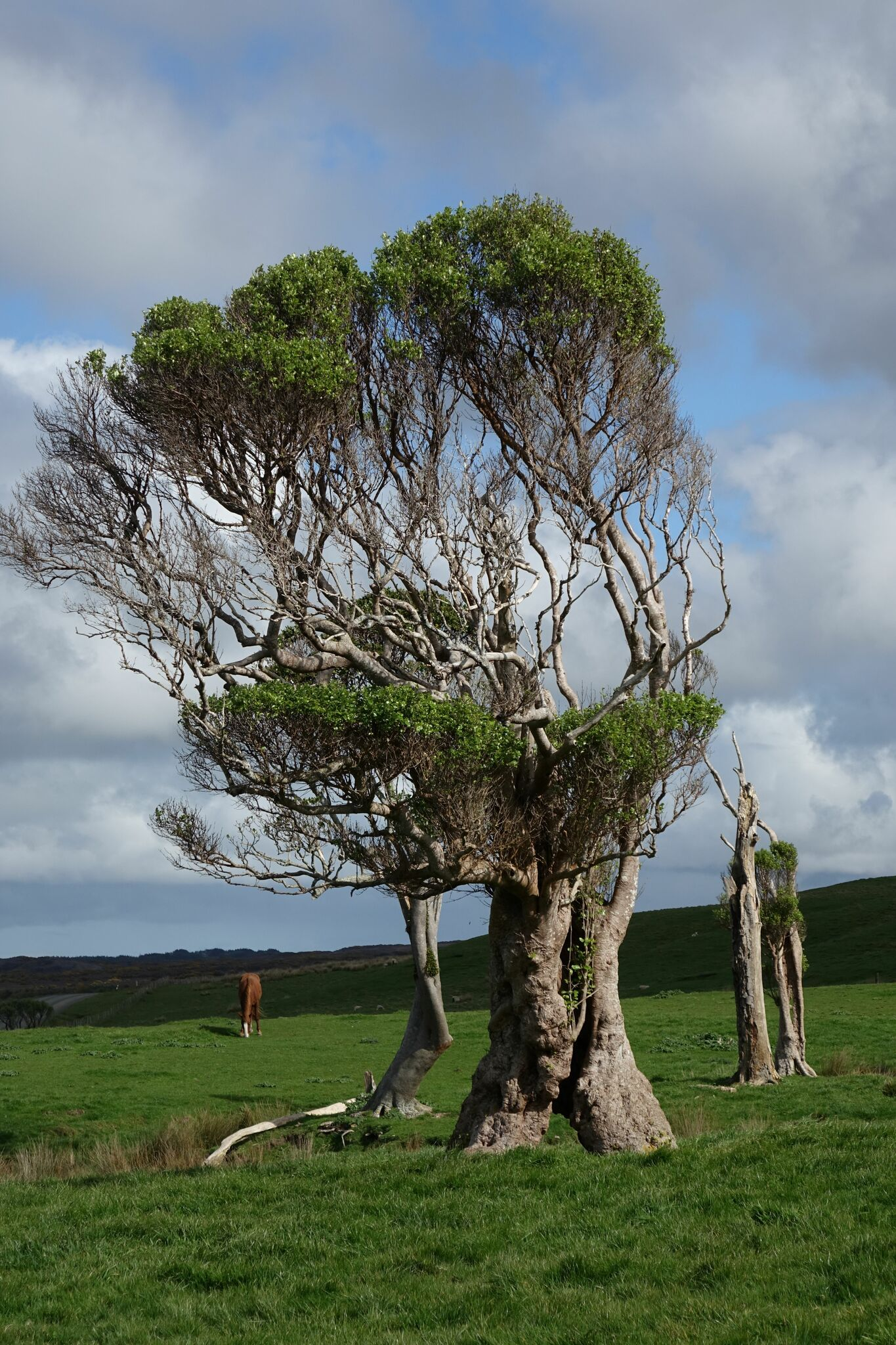
- Coprosma chathamica in the Chatham Islands

Scientific classification
- Kingdom: Plantae
- Clade: Tracheophytes
- Clade: Angiosperms
- Clade: Eudicots
- Clade: Asterids
- Order: Gentianales
- Family: Rubiaceae
- Genus: Coprosma
- Species: C. chathamica

Binomial name
- Coprosma chathamica Cockayne

= Coprosma chathamica =

Species of plant endemic to New Zealand

Coprosma chathamica, commonly known as the Chatham Island karamū, is a species of tree found in New Zealand, endemic to the Chatham Islands.

== Description ==
Coprosma chathamica is a large canopy tree, which grows pairs of oval leaves and ripe yellow fruit. Trees can grow to a height of 15 m (49 ft).

== Distribution and habitat ==
The species is endemic to the Chatham Islands, where it is one of the major forest trees. It grows in coastal and inland forest, typically found on peaty or waterlogged sites.

== Ecology ==
The tree is used as a night time habitat for the longhorn beetle Xylotoles costatus, is a major host plant for the lichen Pyrenula quadratolocularis, and the sole known host plant of the lichen Pyrenula solomonii.

== Traditional uses ==
The tree was traditionally used in Moriori funerary rites. Bodies would be tight bound with Coprosma chathamica vines, standing upright facing the sea, and over time, bones would become incorporated into the wood. Many of these trees were discovered by early European settlers to the islands when clearing trees.

== Gallery ==
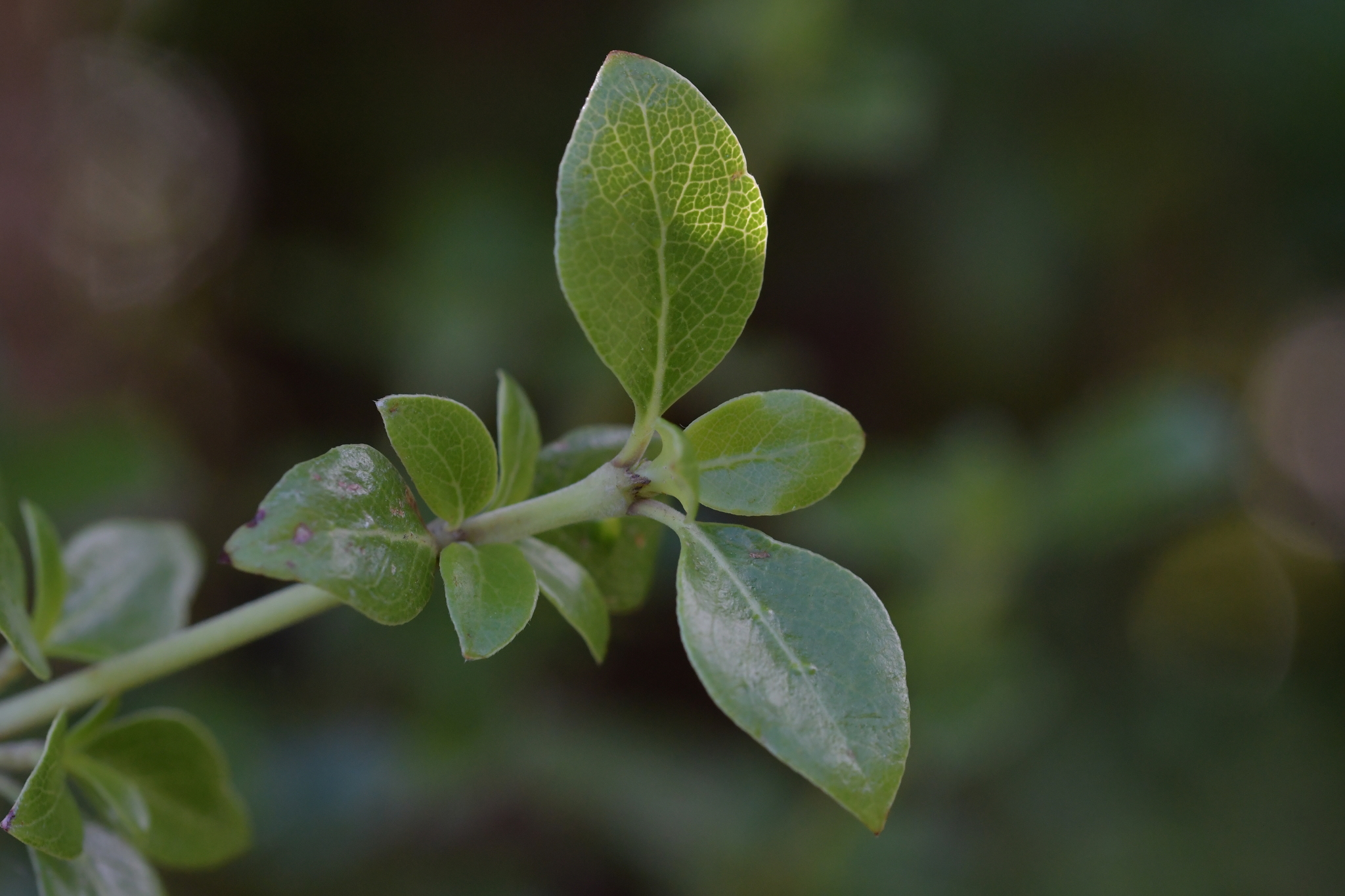
Leaves

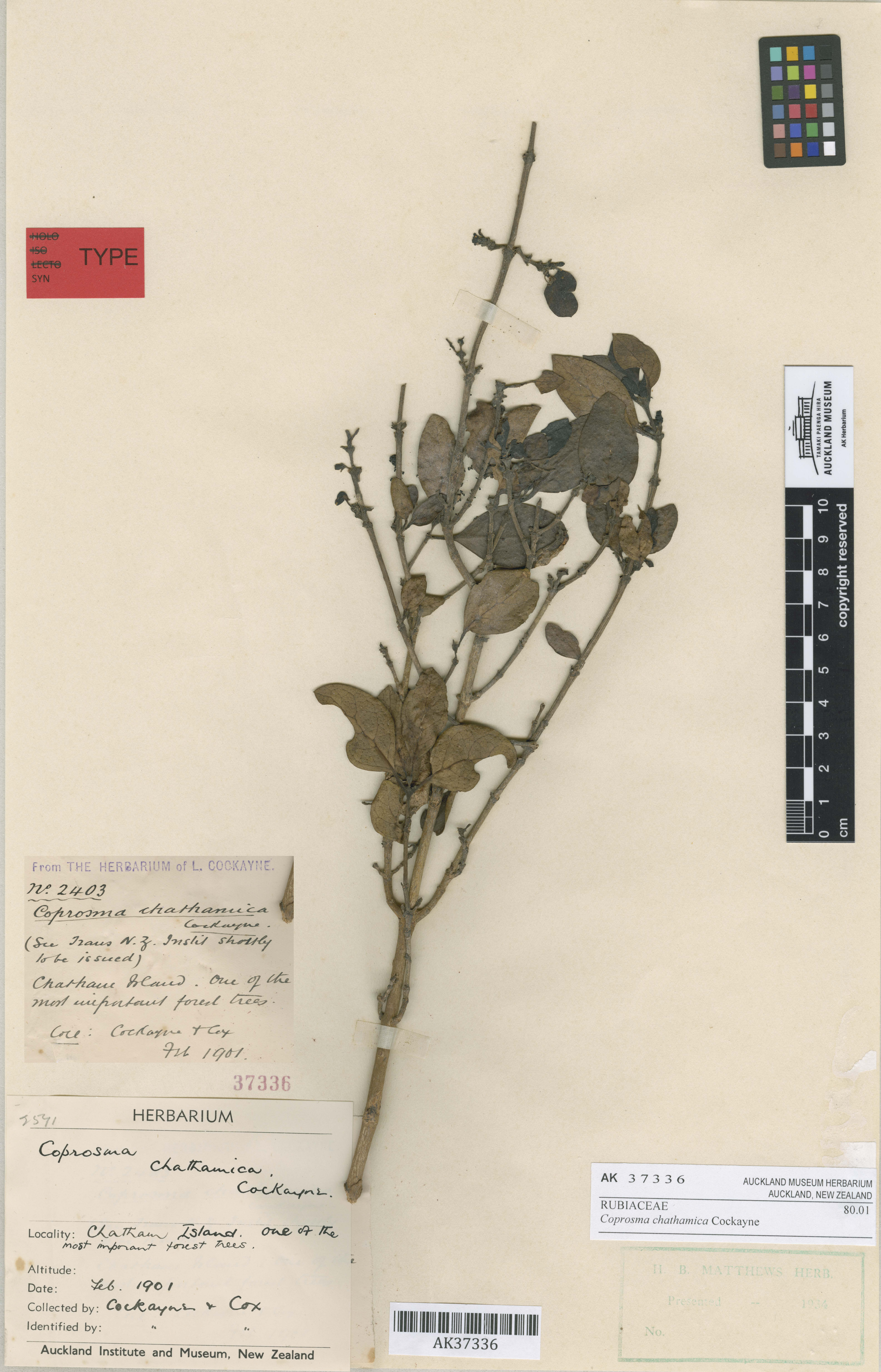
Herbarium specimen

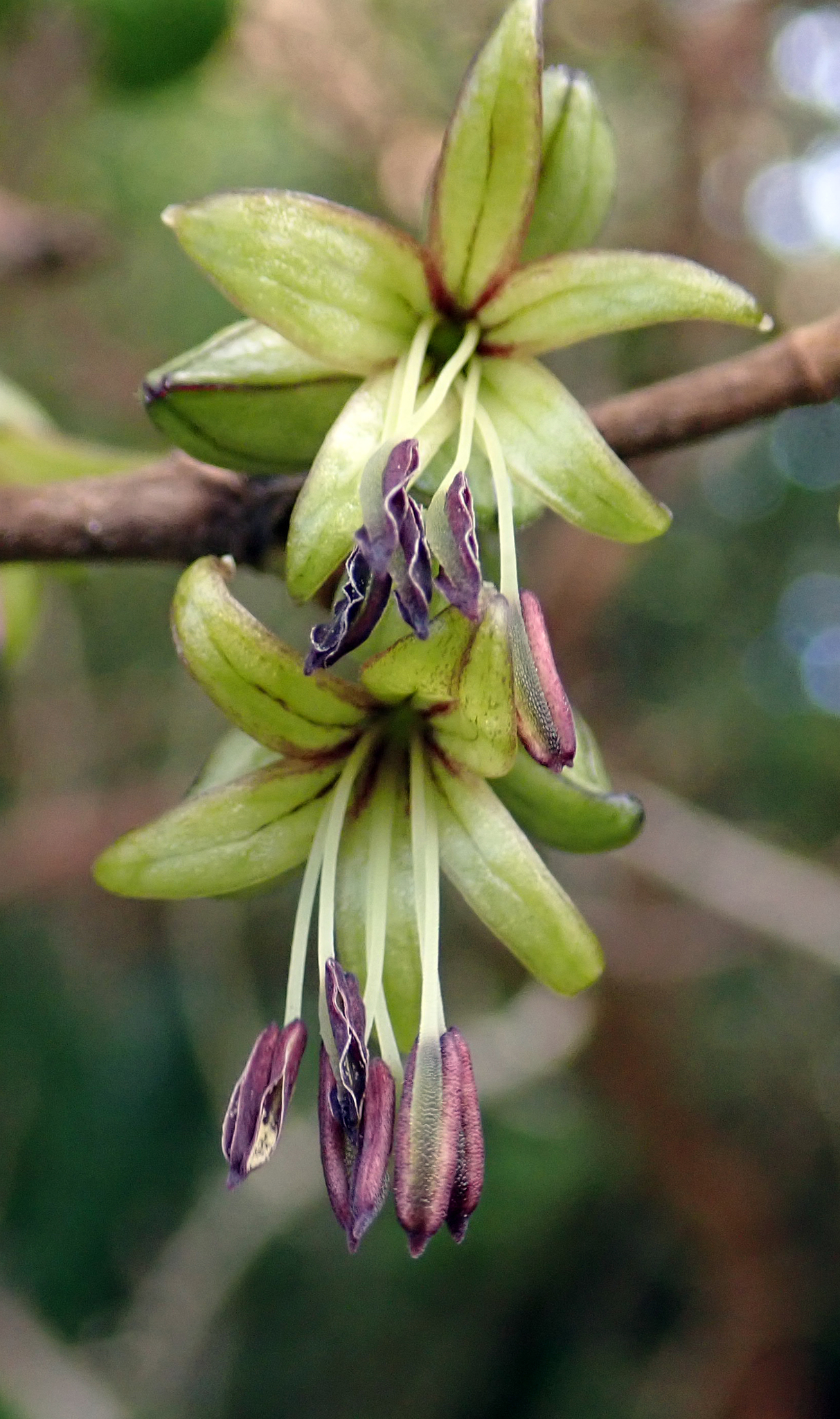
Flowers

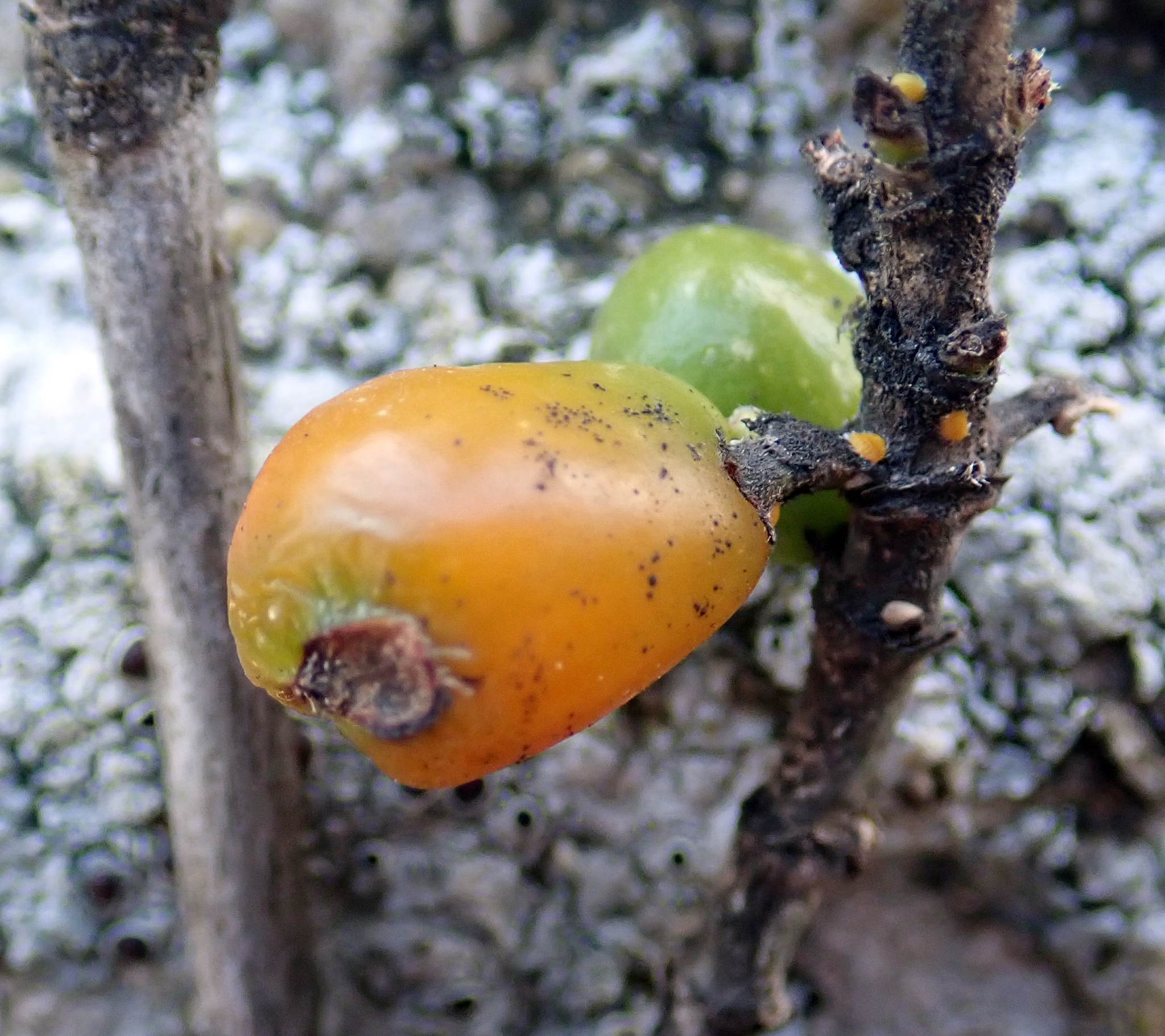
Fruit

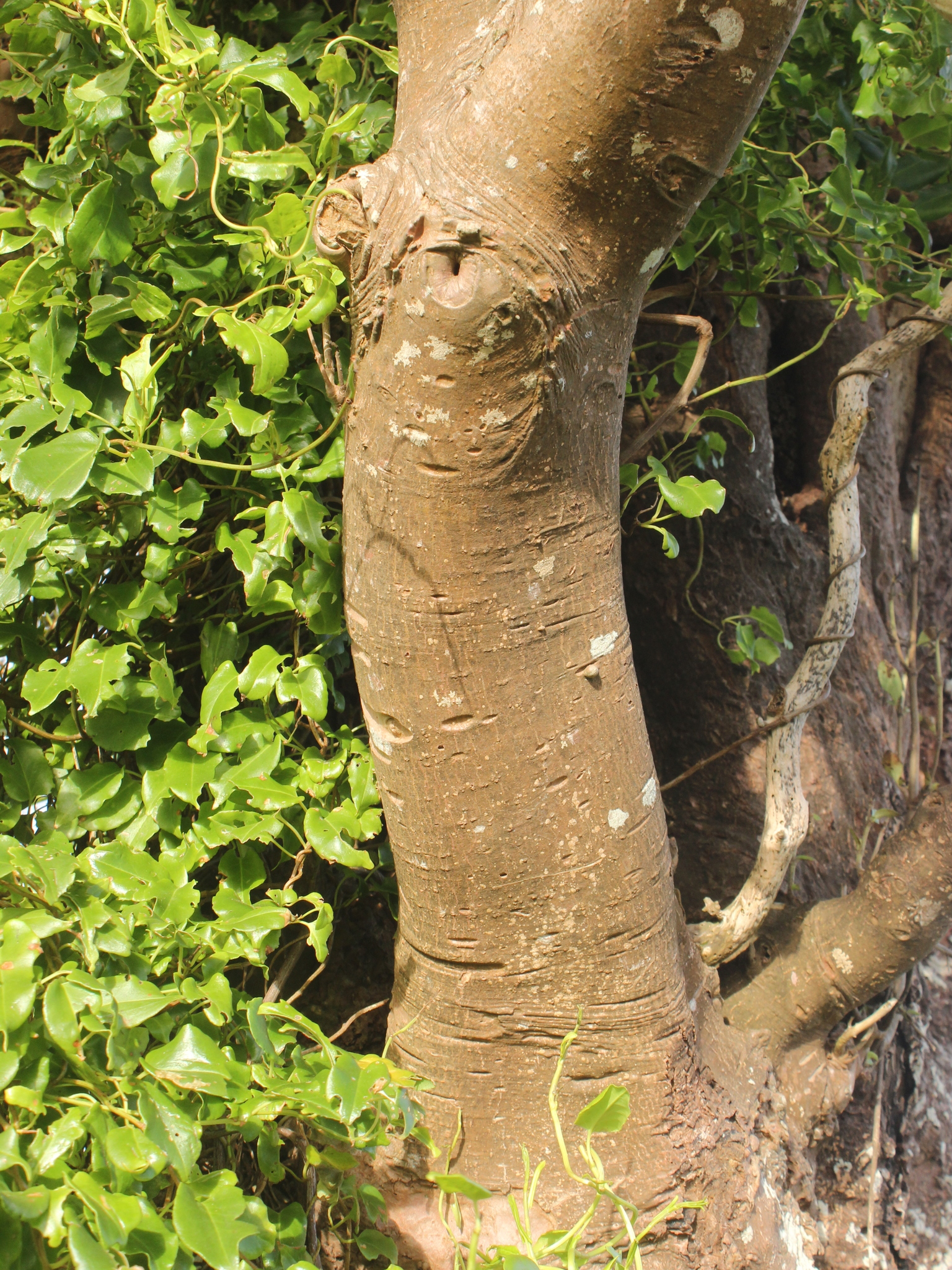
Trunk

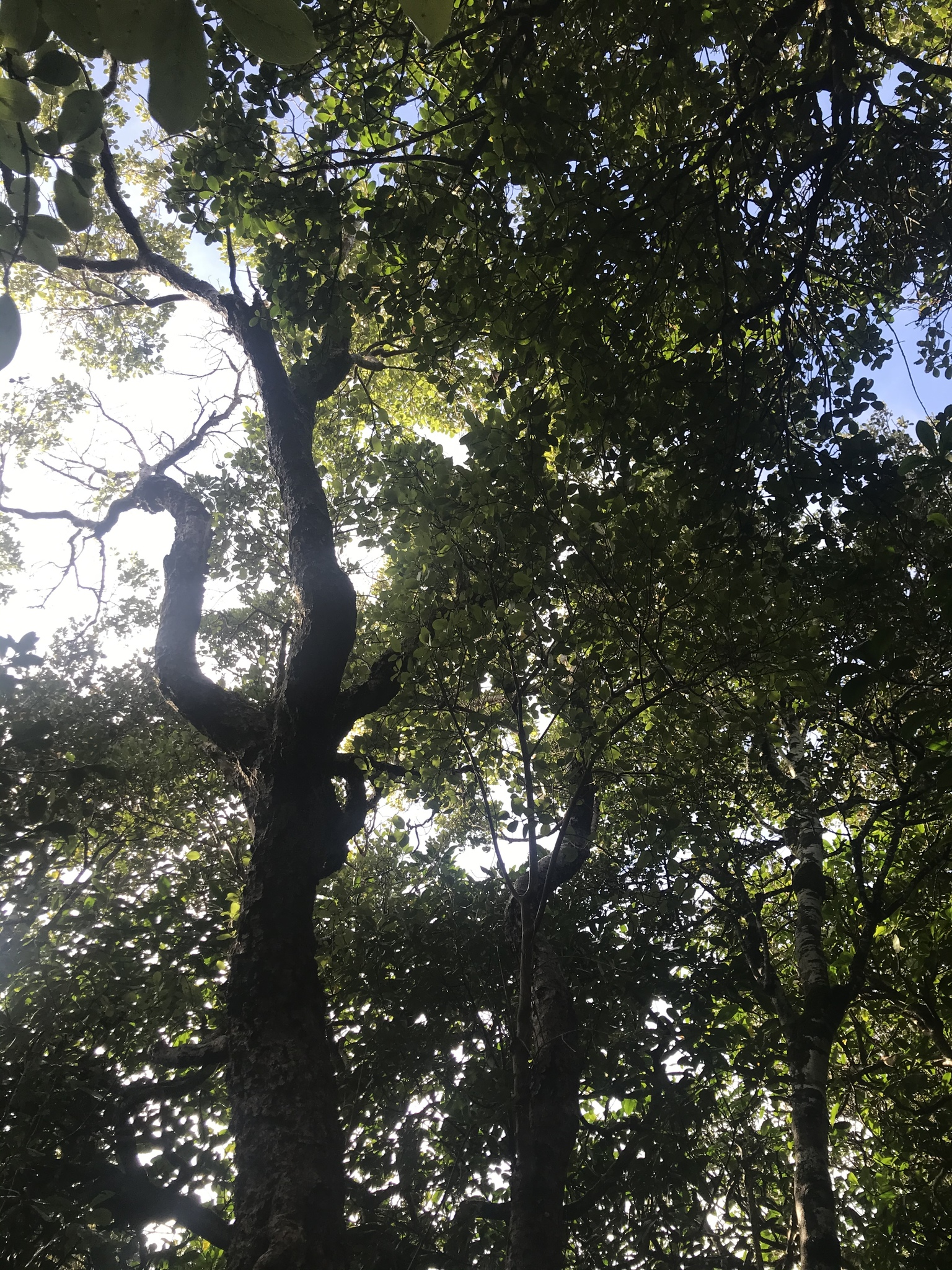
Coprosma chathamica in a forested area
