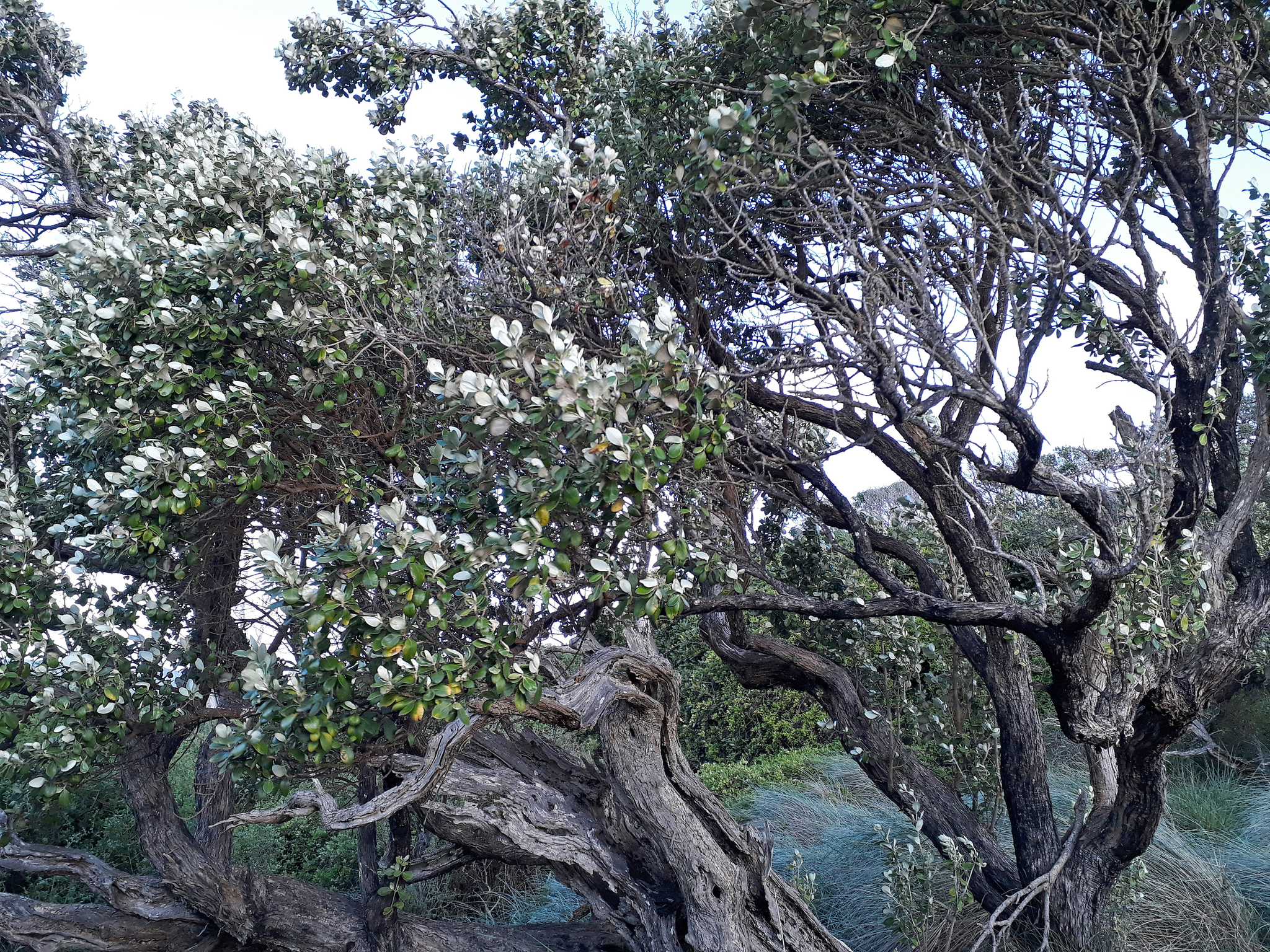
- On Chatham Islands, New Zealand

Conservation status
- Near Threatened (IUCN 2.3)

Scientific classification
- Kingdom: Plantae
- Clade: Embryophytes
- Clade: Tracheophytes
- Clade: Angiosperms
- Clade: Eudicots
- Clade: Asterids
- Order: Asterales
- Family: Asteraceae
- Genus: Olearia
- Species: O. traversiorum

Binomial name
- Olearia traversiorum (F. Muell.) Hook.f.

Synonyms
- Olearia traversii

= Olearia traversiorum =

Species of flowering plant

Olearia traversiorum, the Chatham Island akeake, or Chatham Island tree daisy, is a species of flowering plant in the family Asteraceae. It is endemic to the Chatham Islands of New Zealand. It is also known by the synonym O. traversii.

== Taxonomy ==
traversiorum is an emendation of the originally described traversii, and is meant to honor both William Travers and his son Henry Travers.

== Human uses ==
O. traversiorum is used both as a garden tree, and for firewood. It has also been exported, and can be grown in other areas with mild oceanic climates such as Scotland.
