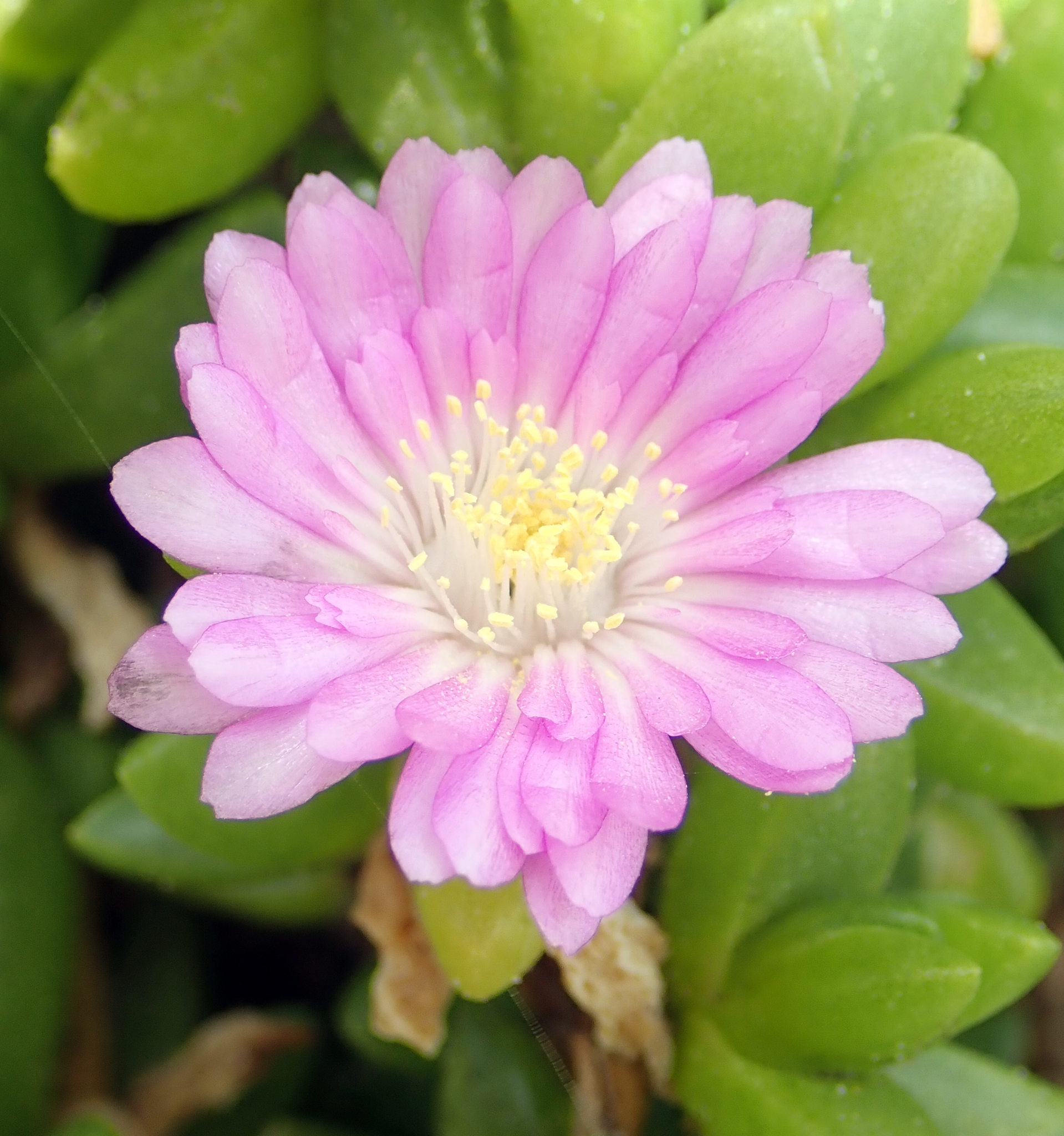
- On Chatham Island

Scientific classification
- Kingdom: Plantae
- Clade: Tracheophytes
- Clade: Angiosperms
- Clade: Eudicots
- Order: Caryophyllales
- Family: Aizoaceae
- Genus: Disphyma
- Species: D. papillatum

Binomial name
- Disphyma papillatum Chinnock

= Disphyma papillatum =

Chatham Island ice plant

Species of succulent

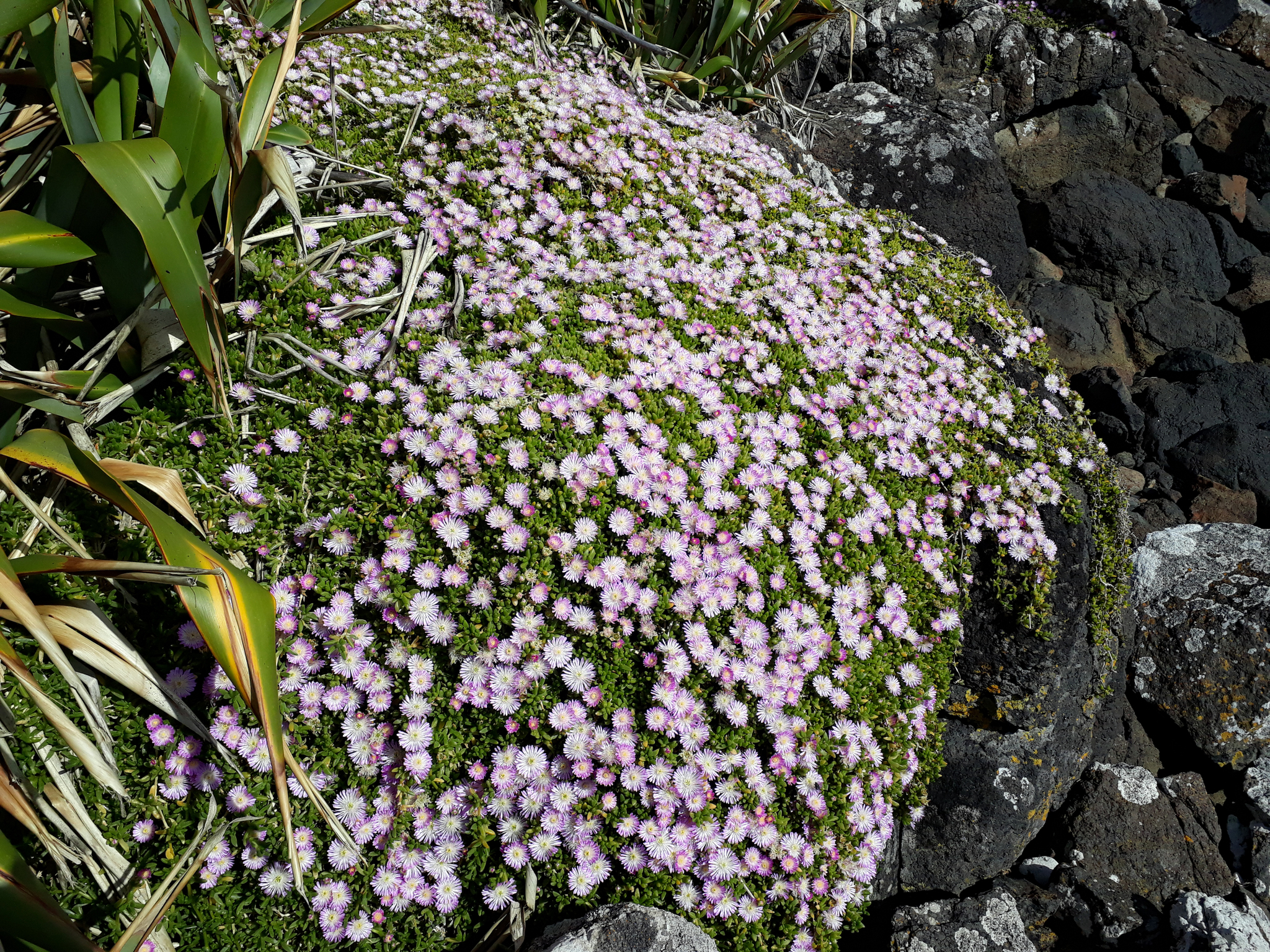
Habit

Disphyma papillatum, commonly known as Chatham Island ice plant, is a species of flowering plant in the family Aizoaceae and is endemic to the Chatham Islands of New Zealand. It is a succulent, prostrate herb with flattened, pimply, trailing stems, leaves that are triangular in cross-section, and white to pink, dark blue or purple daisy-like flowers.

== Description ==
Disphyma papillatum is a succulent, prostrate herb with pimply, two-angled, trailing stems rooting at the nodes, up to 50 cm (20 in) long, the internodes mostly 20–30 mm (0.79–1.18 in) long. The leaves are arranged in pairs, stem-clasping with their bases joined, each leaf triangular in cross-section, mostly 10–15 mm (0.39–0.59 in) long and 5–6 mm (0.20–0.24 in) wide, tapering towards the tip. The flowers are superficially daisy-like, 20–40 mm (0.79–1.57 in) in diameter on a pimply pedicel 20–30 mm (0.79–1.18 in) long with five sepals at the base. The petals are white, pink, dark blue or purple in three to five rows, each petal 10–30 mm (0.39–1.18 in) long and 1.5–2 mm (0.059–0.079 in) wide. There are many stamens with yellow anthers and five or six styles. Flowering occurs from November to January and the fruit is a capsule 5–12 mm (0.20–0.47 in) in diameter before opening. It is similar to Disphyma crassifolium but is distinguished from that species by its pimply, rather than smooth, and flattened, two-angled rather than cylindrical stems.

== Taxonomy ==
Disphyma papillatum was first formally described in 1971 by Robert Chinnock in the New Zealand Journal of Botany.

== Distribution and habitat ==
Carpobrotus glaucescens is endemic to the Chatham Islands of New Zealand, including the main island, Rangiuaria, Rangatira, Mangere Island, Little Mangere Island, Moturoa and Castle Island.
