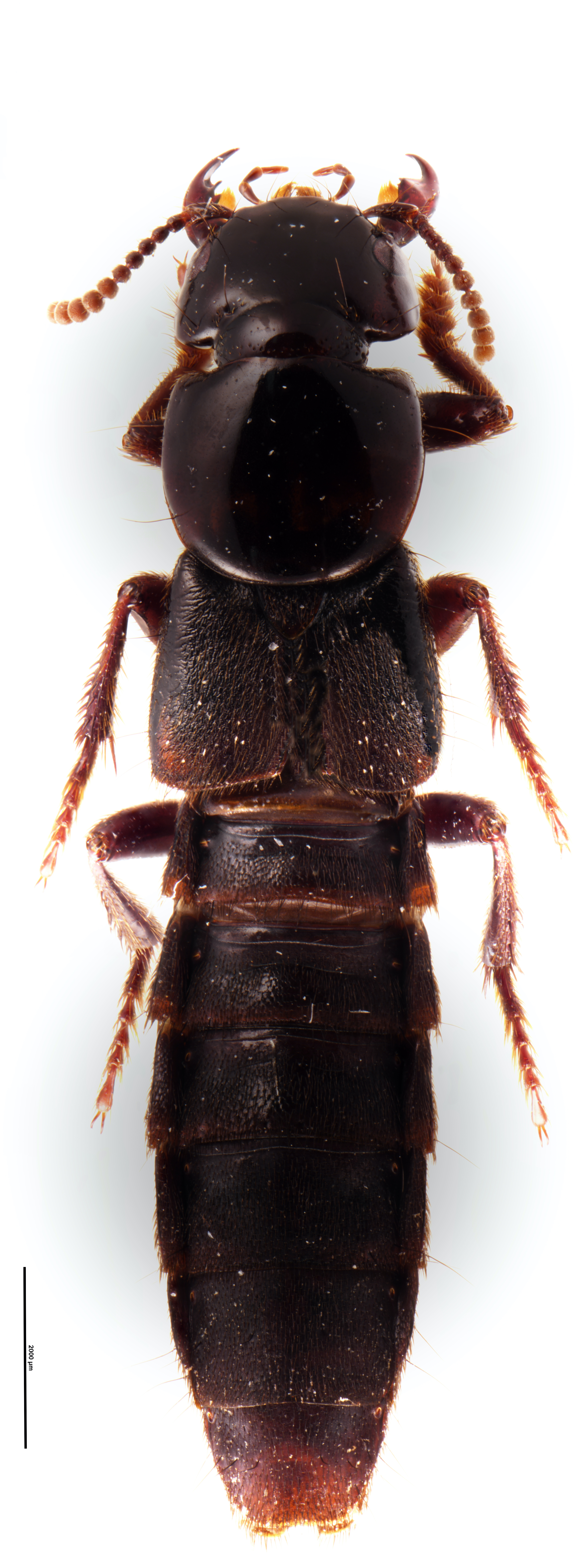
- Holotype of Creophilus rekohuensis

Scientific classification
- Kingdom: Animalia
- Phylum: Arthropoda
- Clade: Pancrustacea
- Class: Insecta
- Order: Coleoptera
- Suborder: Polyphaga
- Infraorder: Staphyliniformia
- Family: Staphylinidae
- Genus: Creophilus
- Species: C. rekohuensis

Binomial name
- Creophilus rekohuensis Clarke, 2011

= Creophilus rekohuensis =

Species of beetle

Creophilus rekohuensis is a beetle of the Staphylinidae family, subfamily Staphylininae. This species occurs only on some small predator-free islands in the Chatham Islands, New Zealand, where it lives in seabird burrows. Its name derives from Rekohu, the Moriori name for Chatham Island.

== Discovery and naming ==
This species was first noted in 1924 by C. Lindsay, and a specimen collected on Mangere was sent to the Canterbury Museum. Rowan Emberson of Lincoln University collected two from a petrel burrow on Mangare in 1993, and John Marris and Emberson collected others in expeditions in 1997 and 1998 to Mangere, Rangatira, and Star Keys, in burrows, and under logs and leaf litter, and with pitfall traps.

The type specimens was collected in Woolshed Bush, Rangatira Island, in February 2006 by David Clarke and M. Renner; the holotype was deposited in Lincoln University's Entomology Research Collection, and paratypes went to the Field Museum and the New Zealand Arthropod Collection.

== Description ==
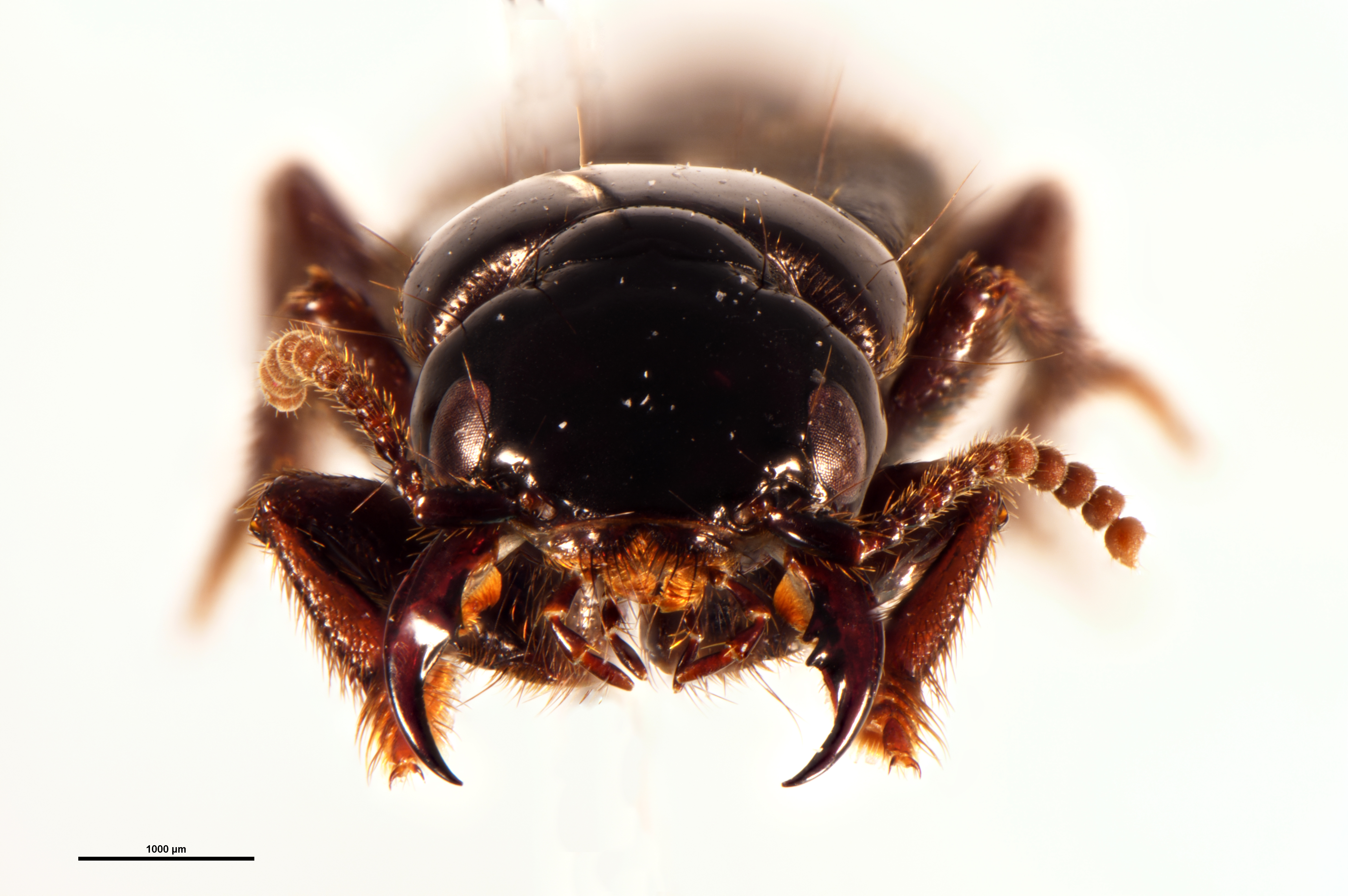
Head of Creophilus rekohuensis

Emberson noted that the unnamed Creophilus species he had collected was similar to the mainland New Zealand species C. huttoni, but its tiny hairs were silver rather than gold in colour.

In his description of the species, Clarke noted that it had a large trapezoidal head, pale yellowish brown behind the eyes, and asymmetrical last segment of the antennae and reduced last segment of the front foot (protarsomere). The sexes seemed to be similar in size, unlike all other Creophilus species.

Clarke also noted its greatly reduced wings; this species, unlike most staphylinid beetles, is flightless. When disturbed, it still has a flight response, spreading its wings while running away.

== Distribution and habitat ==
Creophilus rekohuensis has only been recorded from small islands south east of Chatham Island, New Zealand. Specimens have been collected from Mangere Island, Pitt Island, a tiny islet off the north-west coast of Pitt Island called Rabbit Island, Star Keys (14.5 km east of Pitt Island), and Rangatira Island – most collections have been from Rangatira.

The preferred habitat on Rangatira seems to be coastal broadleaf forest, made up of Myrsine, Pseudopanax, and Coprosma species, riddled with the burrows of white-faced storm petrels, diving petrels, and broad-billed prions. The forest floor in seabird colonies is compacted and has little leaf litter, but C. rekohuensis is able to shelter in burrows. It is also found in coastal herbfields of Sarcocornia and Disphyma.

== Ecology ==
Creophilus species are carrion feeders, consuming maggots on rotting corpses both as adults and larvae, but there has been only one observation of C. rekohuensis on carrion. However seabirds that die on Rangatira Island are rapidly skeletonised by the abundant endemic wētā species Talitropsis megatibia and Novoplectron serratum.

== Conservation ==
All attempts to find C. rekohuensis on Pitt and Chatham Islands using pitfall traps with carrion have been unsuccessful, so the species seems to be restricted to islands where introduced predators are absent; although Rangatira Island was farmed until 1961, it never had cats, rats, or mice. It is possible the species might survive on main Chatham Island in seabird colonies with intact forest and rodent control, such as the taiko colony at Tuku Nature Reserve.

Like other flightless beetles of the Chatham Islands, C. rekohuensis is vulnerable to rodent invasion of its last remaining refuges; unlike them, it does not have any formal protection under the Wildlife Act 1953. It has not been assessed under the Department of Conservation's Threatened Species Categories, let alone had a species recovery plan drawn up.
