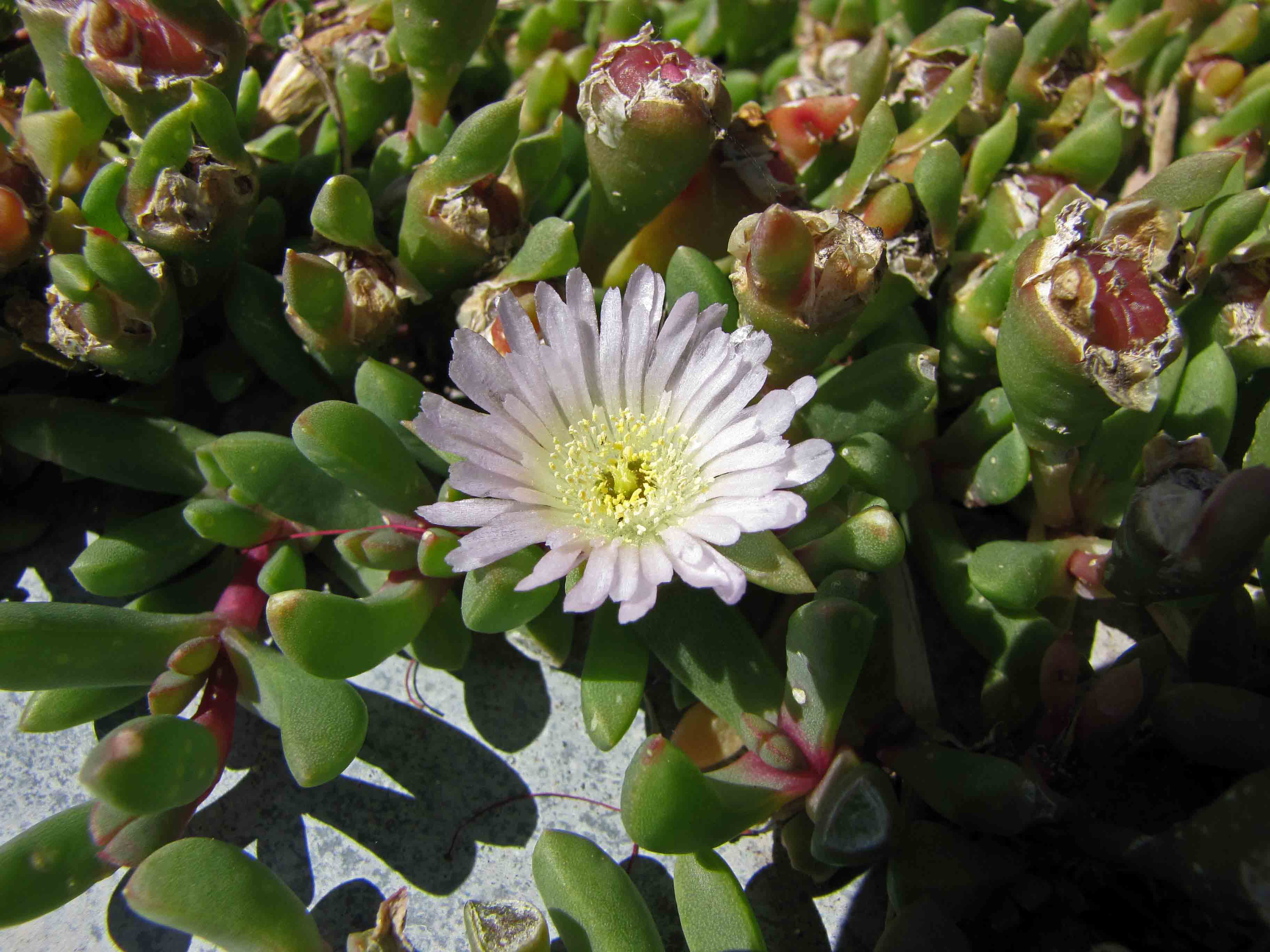
- Disphyma australe on Marine Parade, Napier, New Zealand

Scientific classification
- Kingdom: Plantae
- Clade: Tracheophytes
- Clade: Angiosperms
- Clade: Eudicots
- Order: Caryophyllales
- Family: Aizoaceae
- Genus: Disphyma
- Species: D. australe

Binomial name
- Disphyma australe (Sol. ex Aiton) Brown, 1930

= Disphyma australe =

New Zealand ice plant

Species of succulent

Disphyma australe is a species of flowering plant in the family Aizoaceae and is endemic to New Zealand. It is a prostrate, succulent annual shrub or short-lived perennial plant with stems up to 2 m (6 ft 7 in) long, leaves that are three-sided in cross-section with a rounded lower angle, and white to deep pink daisy-like flowers that are 2–4 cm (0.79–1.57 in) in diameter with 3–5 rows of petals and multiple stamens. Disphyma australe is a coastal plant and therefore can be found at cliff faces, gravel beaches, salt meadows and estuaries.

== Taxonomy ==
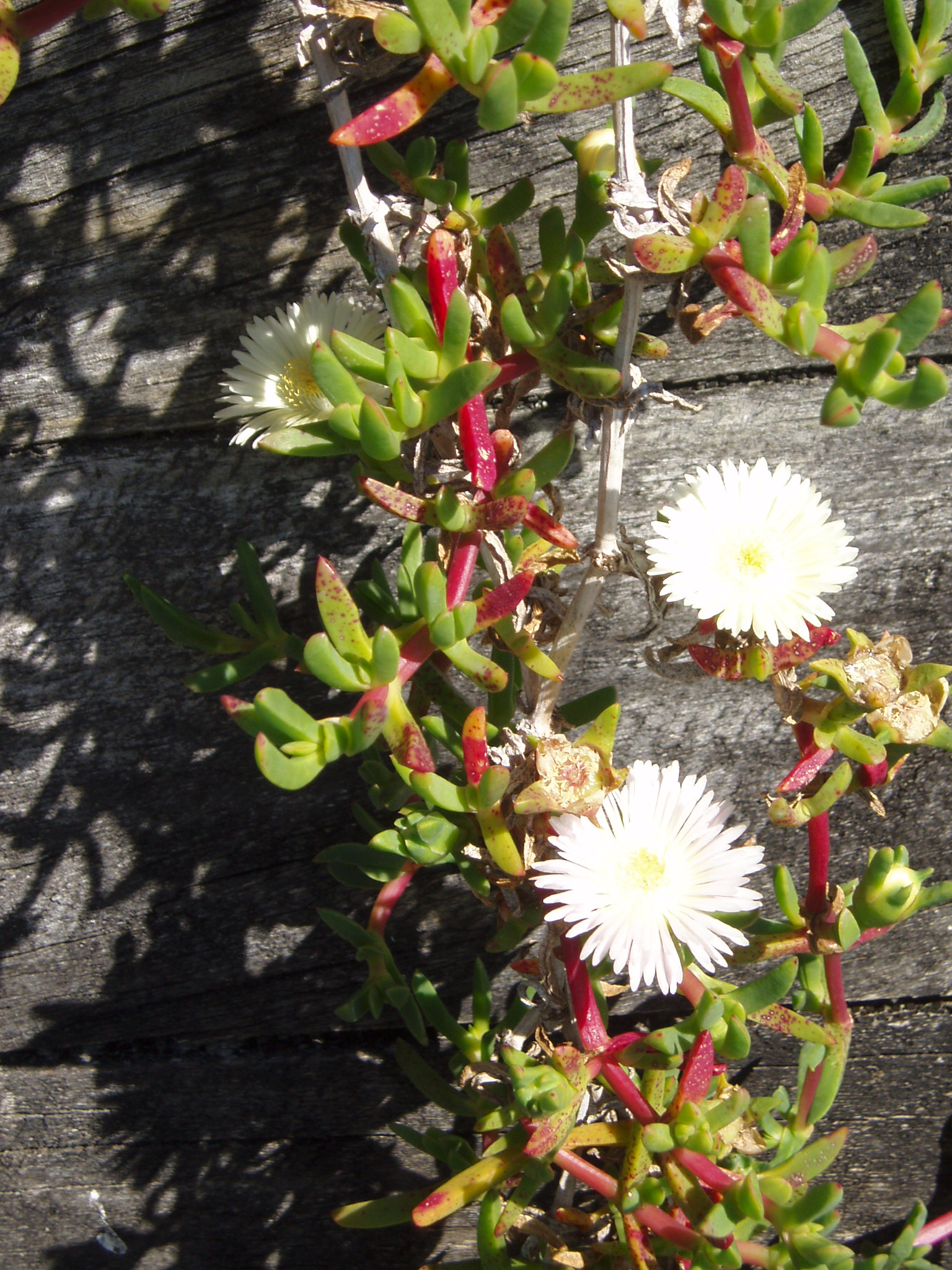
Stems and leaves

New Zealand authorities recognise two subspecies:

- Disphyma australe (W.T.Aiton) N.E.Br. subsp. australe that mostly grows on cliff faces, rock stacks and beaches, rarely in marshes and estuaries and occurs on both the North and South Islands, as well as on the Manawatāwhi / Three Kings, Stewart / Rakiura and Chatham Islands;
- Disphyma australe subsp. stricticaule Chinnock that is endemic to the Kermadec Islands where it grows on cliff faces, beaches and near bird nesting grounds.

=== Common names ===
- Ice plant
- New Zealand ice plant
- Māori ice plant
- Native ice plant
- Horokaka (Māori name)
- Kermadec ice plant (only for subsp. stricticaule)

== Description ==
Disphyma australe, the New Zealand ice plant, is a succulent herb with a trailing or prostrate habit, which means that its branches usually spread along the ground. The stems are stout, about five millimeters in diameter and can be more than one meter long. Especially old branches tend to be semi-woody. Disphyma australe has triangular, fleshy leaves that are normally 2 – 4 cm long and circa 0.4 - 0.6 cm wide. The shape of the leaves ́ tips ranges from pointed (acute) to rounded (obtuse), and their base is connotated. The leaves are arranged opposite one another. An important difference between Disphyma australe and the congener Dispyhma papillatum is the smooth leave surface of Disphyma australe in contrast to the roughed one of Disphyma papillatum.

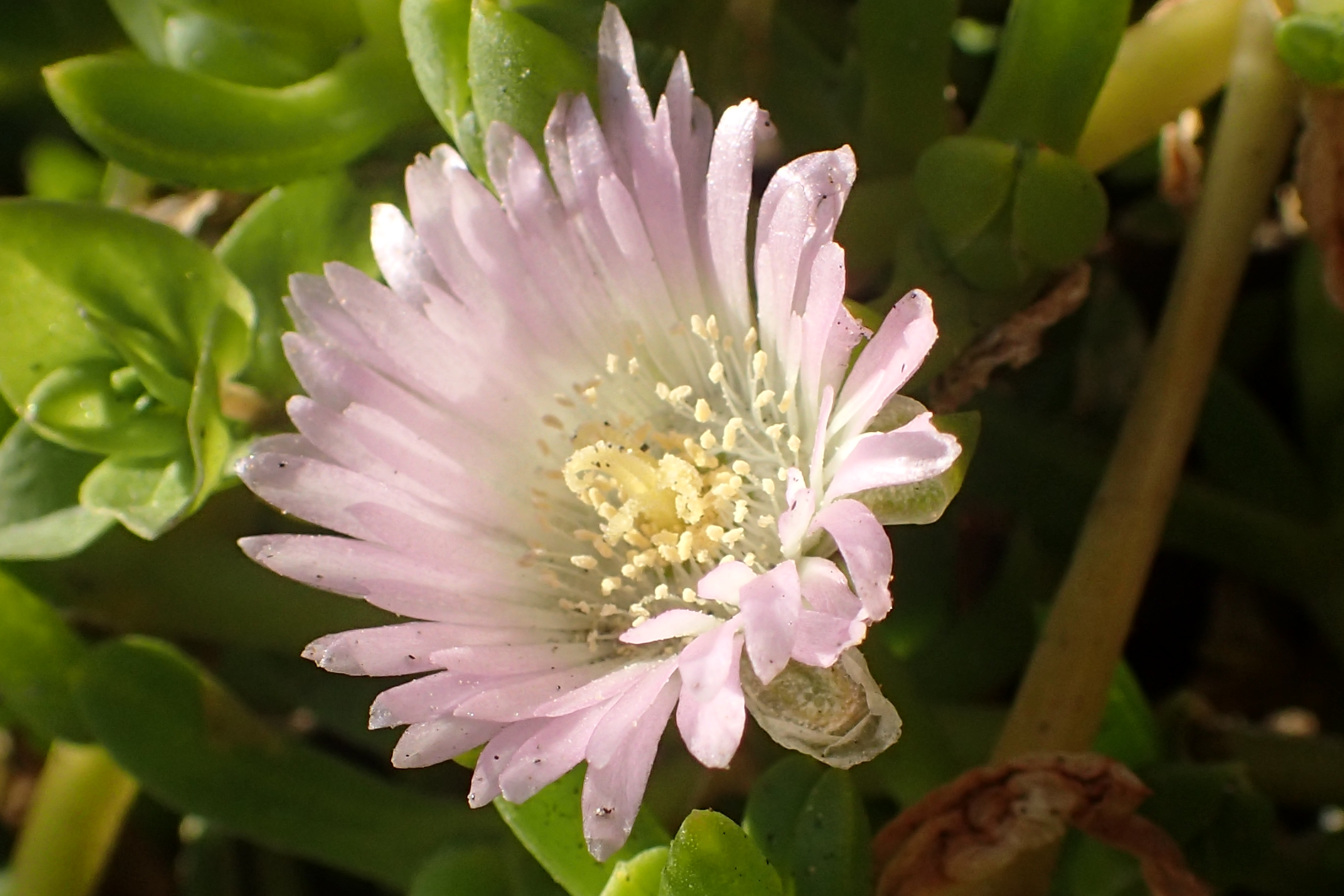
Flower

Another good feature for identifying the plant is its outstanding white or pink flowers, which have a diameter between 2 – 4 cm. Each flower sits at the end of a 1 – 4 cm peduncle and has many 1 – 3 cm petals ordered in 3 - 5 rows. Five lobes, two of them noticeably larger, form the succulent calyx. The reproductive organs of the plant consist of the female, 5 - 8 celled carpels including 5 - 8 styles and usually 6 - 8 stigmas, and numerous male 4 – 6 mm long stamens, which have filaments that are hairy at the bottom.

The fruits of Disphyma australe are fleshy, vase-shaped capsules with some parallel silts, which allow the fruit to open, a flat end and wings. Each capsule encloses the brown, rugose, oblong or egg-shaped, 0.9 - 1.2 mm long seeds. They are compressed, with a slanted or cuneate, notched bottom and a rounded tip.

There are two subspecies of Disphyma australe, Disphyma australe subsp. australe and subsp. stricticaule, which differ only slightly in a few characteristics. Whereas D. australe has papillose sepal keels and placental tubercles can be present, D. stricticaule has smooth sepal keels and no placental tubercles.

== Range ==
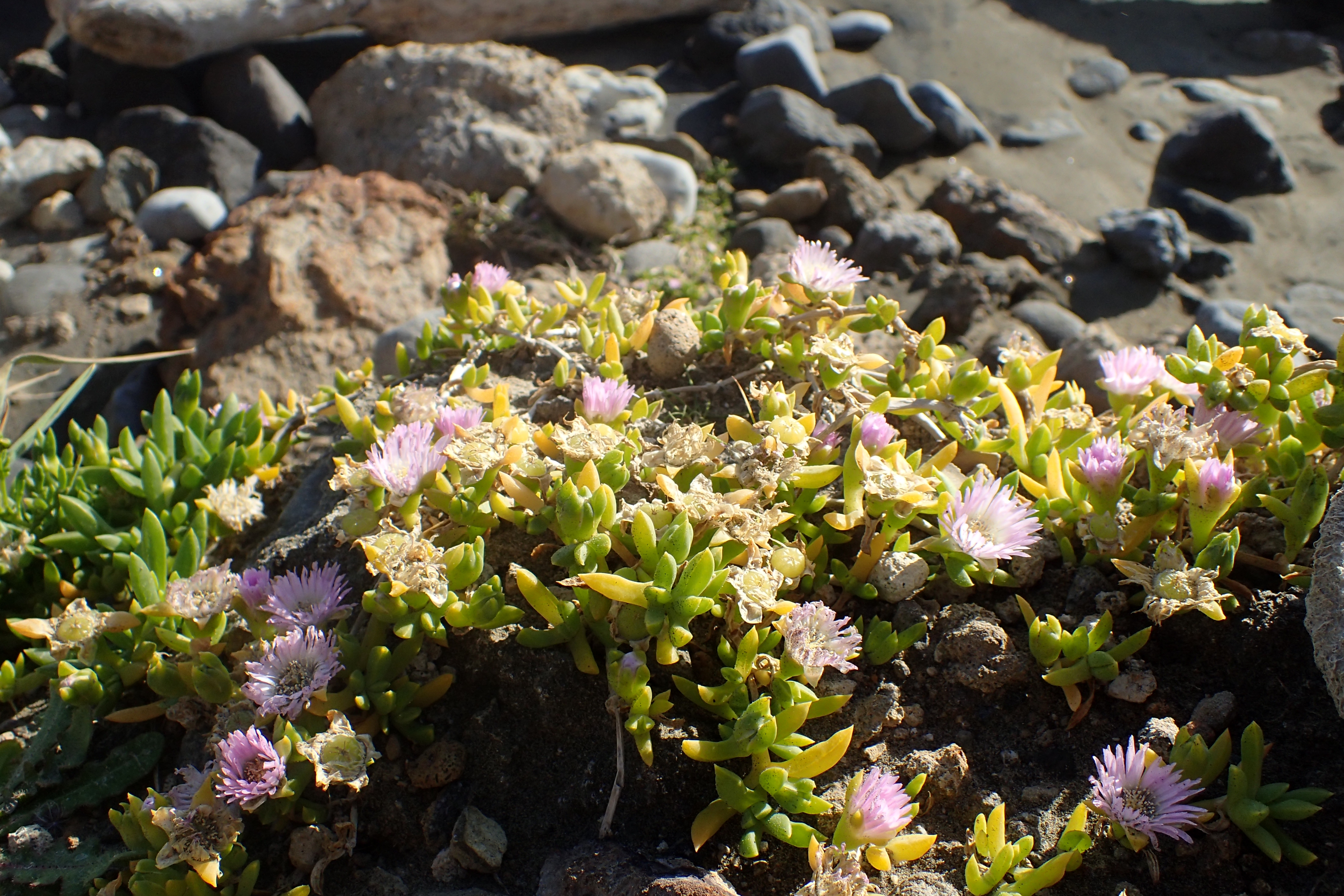
Disphyma australe in Hāwera (Taranaki, New Zealand)

Disphyma australe is endemic to New Zealand, that is, it occurs naturally only in New Zealand. It now also grows on a few Australian islands, such as Tasmania, Norfolk Island and Lord Howe Island.

The two subspecies of Disphyma australe, D. australe australe and D. australe stricticaule, are common in different parts of New Zealand. D. australe stricticaule is only found on Kermadec Islands, whereas D. australe australe is found on both the North and South Island throughout the coast. It also occurs on some smaller New Zealand islands, like Stewart Island, Chatham Islands and Solander Islands. Additionally, it coexists with D. australe stricticaule on the Kermadec Islands.

== Habitat ==
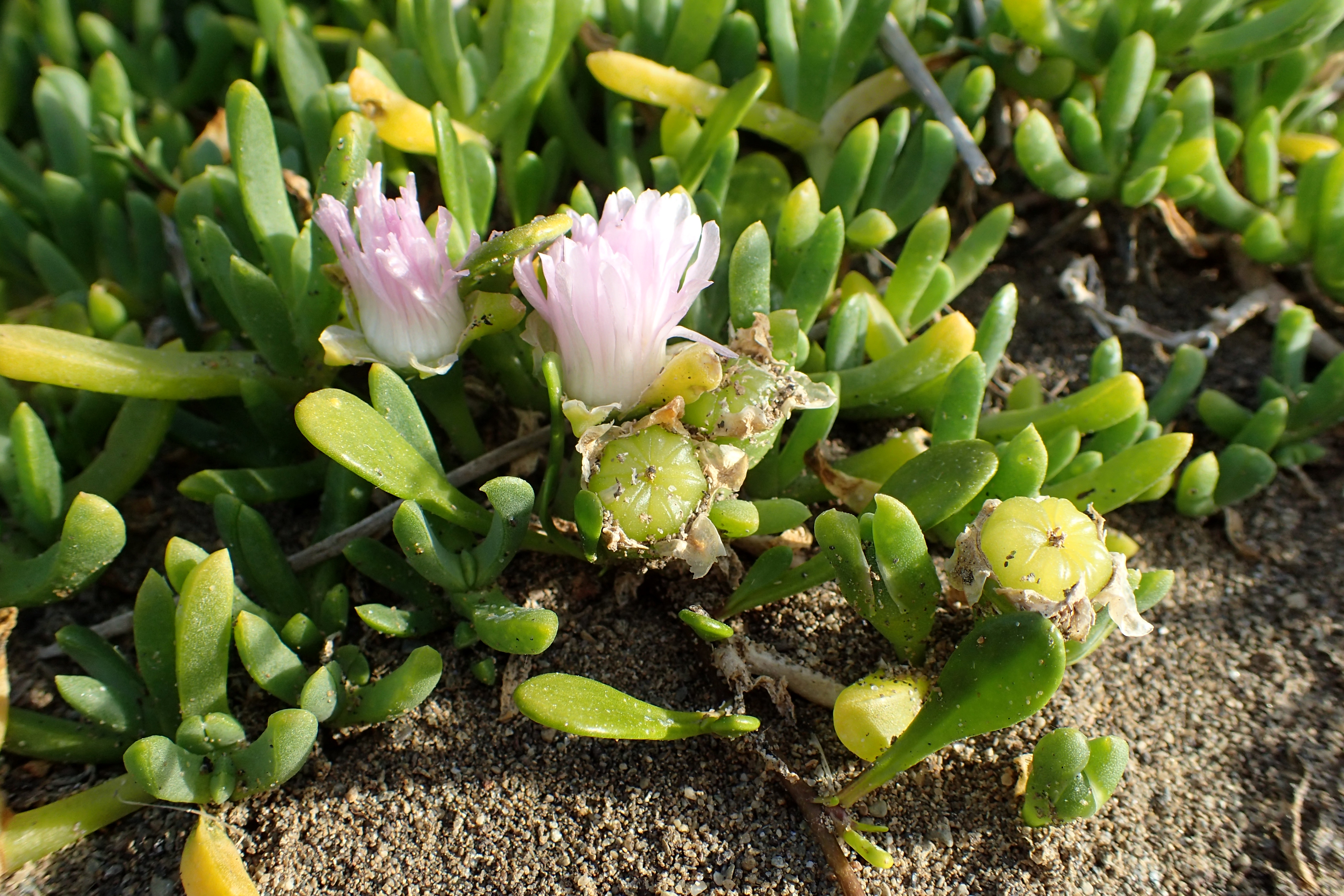
Flowers and fruits

While Disphyma australe is rarely found inland, it is very common at the coast. It prefers especially rocky shores, and both subspecies grow on cliff faces, rocks and on gravel and cobble beaches. Furthermore, it can also occur in other types of coastal habitats, including salt meadows or estuaries and occasionally at the back of sandy beaches. Another place where Disphyma australe grows is near nesting grounds of sea birds, such as near petrel burrows, because in contrast to many other plants it can survive high amounts of bird droppings.

== Ecology ==
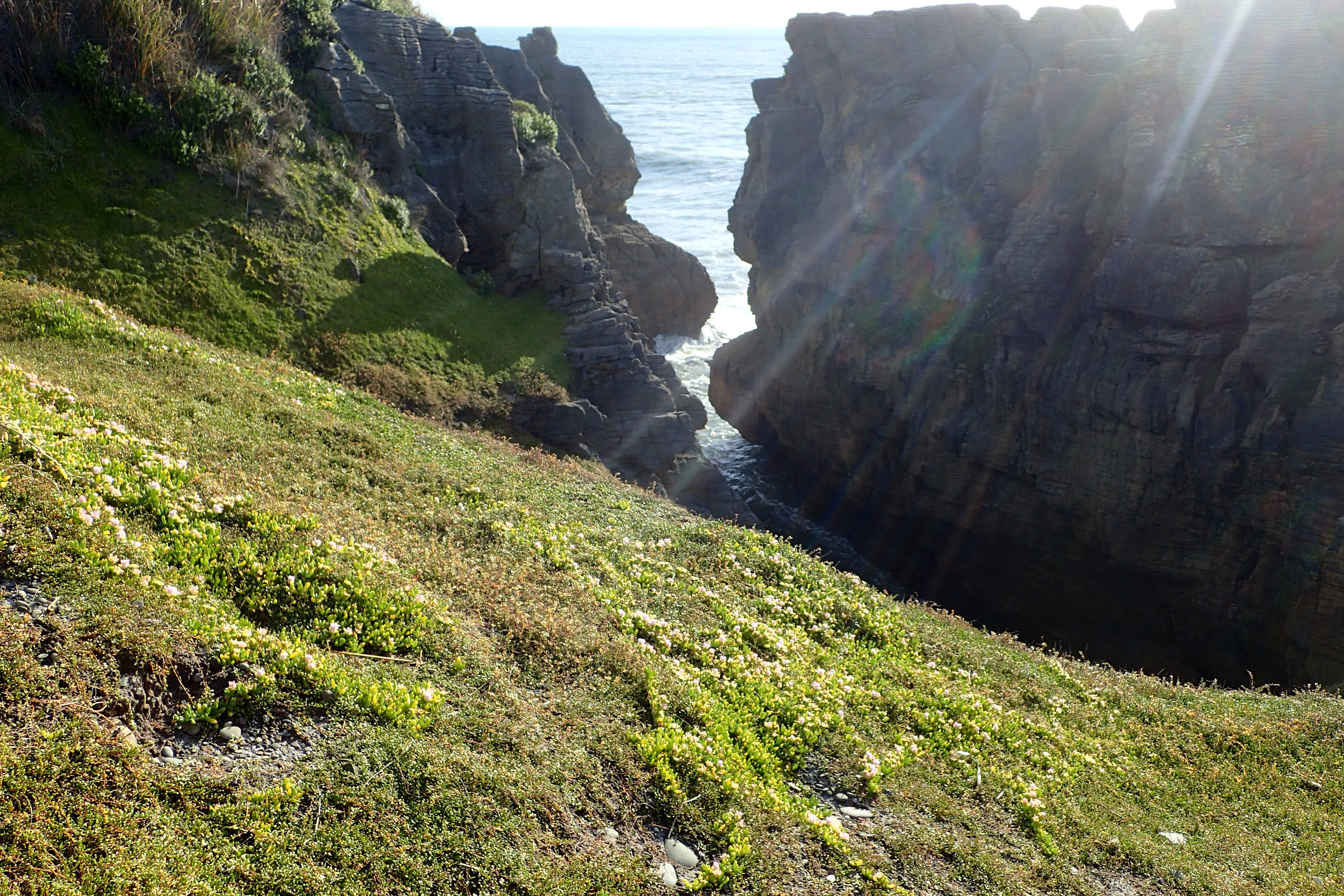
Disphyma australe in Punakaiki, Pancake rocks (Westland, New Zealand)

=== Life cycle and phenology ===
Disphyma australe is a perennial plant that can propagate either by seeds or by separated plant parts that can root again elsewhere. Its flowers can be seen throughout the year, but mainly it blooms from spring to summer. The flowers can turn with the sun and, as the original name mesembryanthemum indicated, are mainly open at midday. Moreover, fruiting is typically between December and January, although fruits can also be found from September to April. As characteristic of the Aizoaceae family, the seeds are enclosed in capsules, which are closed during dry weather and open under wet or moist conditions, especially after heavy rainfall. This phenomenon is called hygrochasy and occurs because the seeds germinate best on wet ground. The mechanism still works when the plant is already dead. Through wind, water or animals that eat the fruits of Disphyma australe, the seeds can be dispersed in more distant places.

=== Diet and foraging ===
As a coastal plant, which mainly grows on rocks and has the ability to store water, Disphyma australe favours dry, well-drained ground with direct sunshine, but has no particular preferences regarding soil fertility. Therefore, it is often found on gravel but can also be found on sandstone or limestone cliffs. Although most plants cannot tolerate high salt concentrations in the soil, studies show that Disphyma australe grows better when watered with water of moderate salinity instead of normal rainwater. This corresponds with the statement that Disphyma australe is “prominent in the saltiest places”, such as cliff faces and seashores, which are exposed to the salt spray of the ocean.

=== Predators, parasites and diseases ===
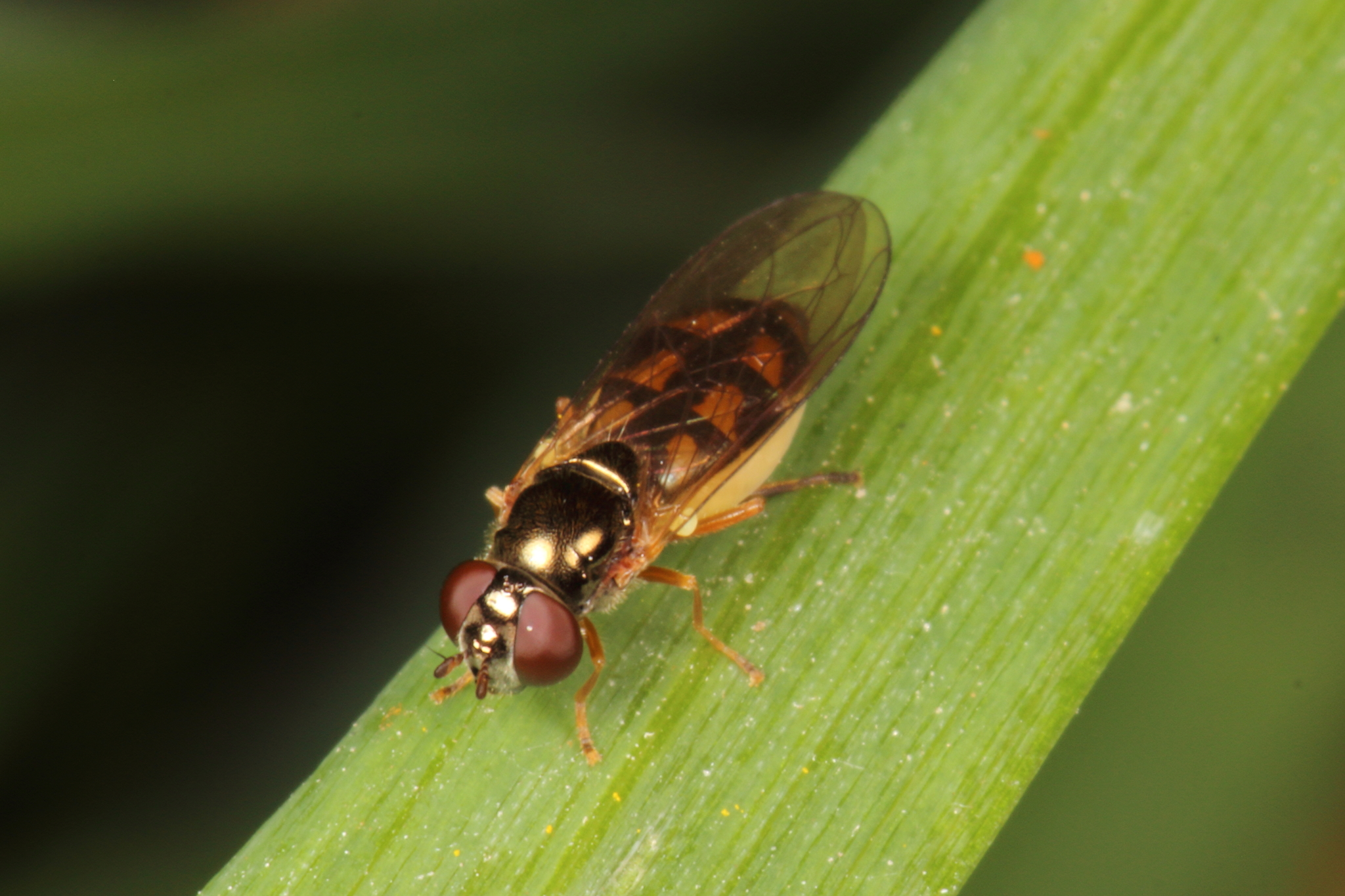
Melanostoma fasciatum, a pollinator of Disphyma australe

Though there are few studies on the herbivores of Disphyma australe, some species that feed on the plant are known. Among them is the hoverfly Melanostoma fasciatum, which pollinates Disphyma australe. Aethina concolor, however, is an adventive, herbivorous beetle that eats the flowers. Another beetle that feeds on Disphyma australe is Holoparamecus spp. The leaves can be infested with sucking bugs such as the scale insects Poliaspis media, which might cause galls on the underside of leaves, and the introduced Pulvinaria mesembryanthemi, a bug specialised to host plants of the Mesembryanthemum family. Additionally, larvae of the plantain moth (Xanthorhoe rosearia) and the springtail species Hypogastrura rossi can be found on the plant.

== Cultural uses ==
Disphyma australe can be used in many ways. In addition to its use as a garden plant, it was primarily used as food and in medicine in the past. Māori utilized the juice of the leaves for medical treatment, for example of boils, abscesses, or itch. Recent studies show that Disphyma australe might have an anti-bacterial effect. European settlers ate the bland-tasting, fleshy capsules and pickled the leaves of Disphyma australe.
