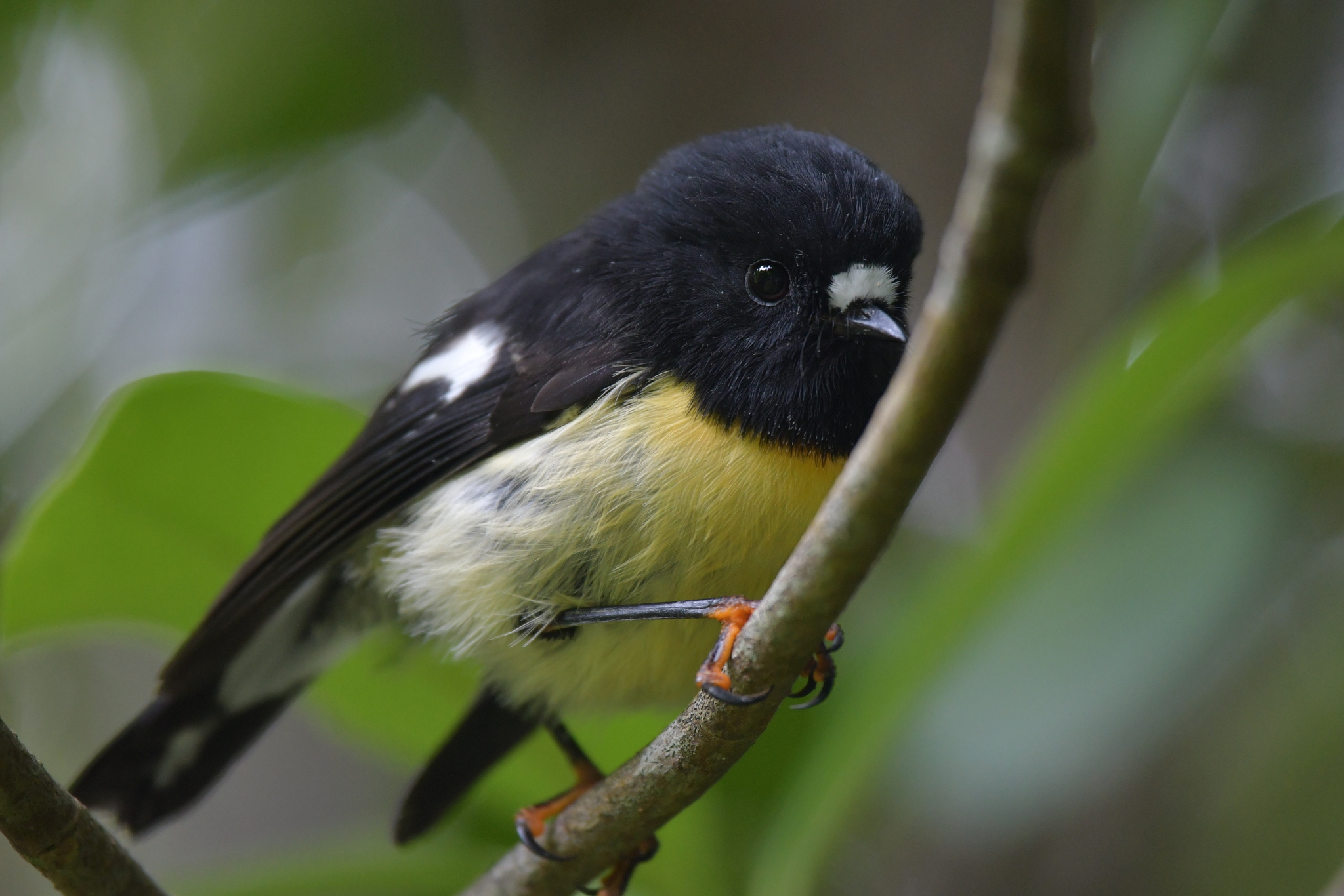
- Recording of an adult male in Glory Bay, Pitt Island

Conservation status
- Nationally Endangered (NZ TCS)

Scientific classification
- Kingdom: Animalia
- Phylum: Chordata
- Class: Aves
- Order: Passeriformes
- Family: Petroicidae
- Genus: Petroica
- Species: P. macrocephala
- Subspecies: P. m. chathamensis

Trinomial name
- Petroica macrocephala chathamensis (CA Fleming, 1950)

= Chatham tomtit =

Subspecies of bird

The Chatham tomtit (Petroica macrocephala chathamensis) is a subspecies of tomtit found on some of the smaller islands of New Zealand. It is most similar in plumage to the South Island tomtit, the nominate subspecies. The New Zealand government is implementing a plan to help this species and other bird species recover. The holotype is in the collection of the Museum of New Zealand Te Papa Tongarewa.

== Distribution ==
The Chatham tomtit has been extinct on Chatham Island since the 1970s. This subspecies now has a population of about 1,000 birds and is currently restricted to the rat-free islands of Rangatira, Mangere and Pitt.
