= Old Blue =

Old Blue may refer to:

- Old Blue, an alumnus of Christ's Hospital
- Old Blue, an alumnus of the University of California, Berkeley
- Old Blue (song), an old folk song, from which many variations have arisen
- Old Blue (rugby club), a Rugby Super League (US) team based in New York City
- The type of British passport issued before 1993
- Old Blue (black robin), the last remaining fertile female that saved the black robin from extinction
- A conservation award given by Forest and Bird named after the black robin
- A traditional name for Yale University
