= Disphyma dunsdonii =

Scientific classification
- Kingdom: Plantae
- Clade: Tracheophytes
- Clade: Angiosperms
- Clade: Eudicots
- Order: Caryophyllales
- Family: Aizoaceae
- Genus: Disphyma
- Species: D. dunsdonii

Binomial name
- Disphyma dunsdonii L.Bolus

Species of succulent plant

Disphyma dunsdonii is a succulent plant belonging to the Aizoaceae family. The species is endemic to South Africa and occurs in the Western Cape, from Bredasdorp to Elim and Potberg. The plant has a range of 2 200 km² and has lost 30% of its habitat to crop cultivation in the past 30 years. It is still threatened by crop cultivation as well as invasive plants and development around Bredasdorp. The crops causing the problems are wheat, proteas and the establishment of vineyards.
