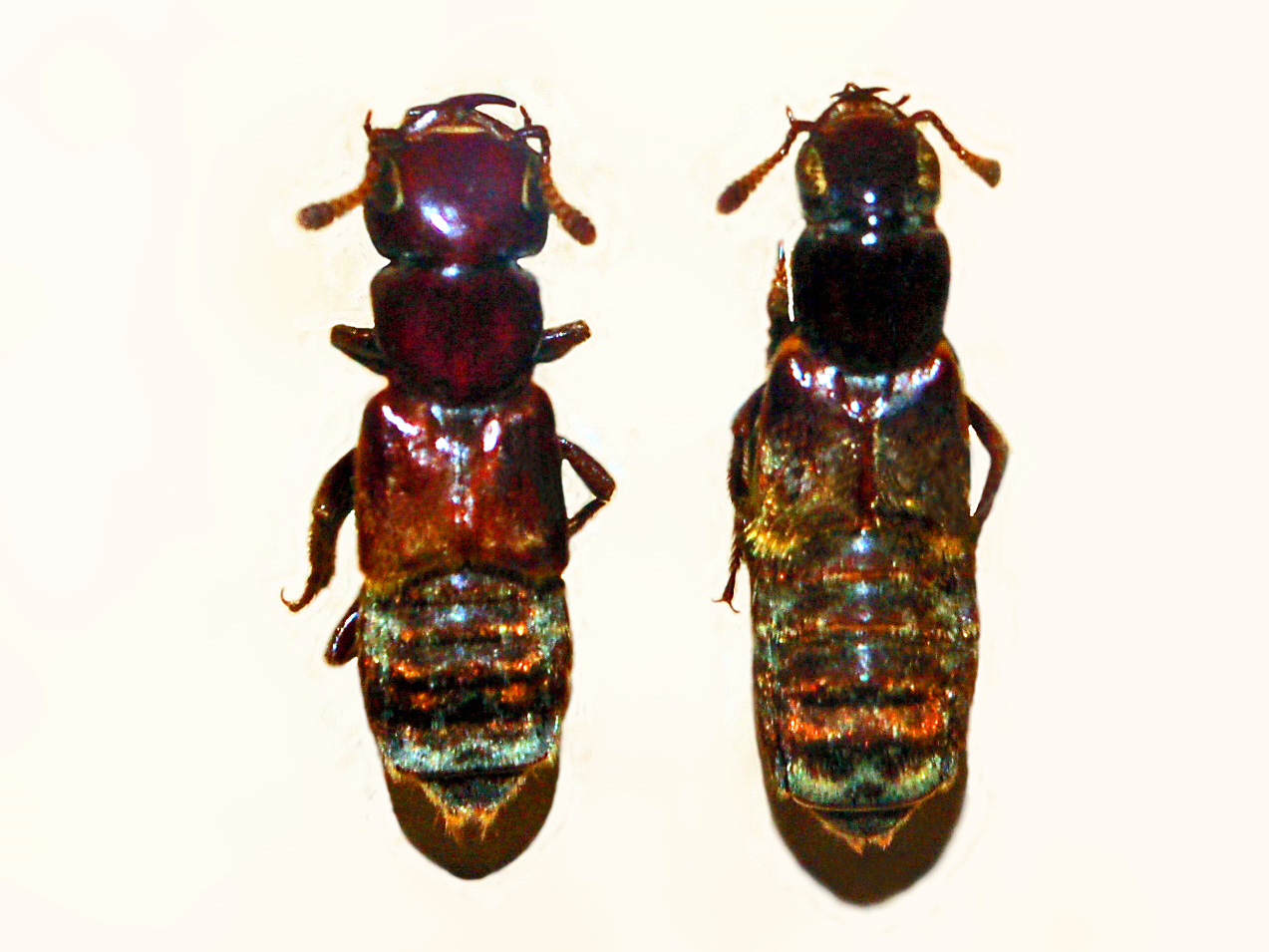
- Creophilus variegatus from Peru. Male and female.

Scientific classification
- Kingdom: Animalia
- Phylum: Arthropoda
- Clade: Pancrustacea
- Class: Insecta
- Order: Coleoptera
- Suborder: Polyphaga
- Infraorder: Staphyliniformia
- Family: Staphylinidae
- Subfamily: Staphylininae
- Genus: Creophilus; Leach, 1819

= Creophilus =

Genus of beetles

Creophilus is a genus of beetles of the Staphylinidae family, subfamily Staphylininae. It includes some of the largest rove beetle species, up to 30 mm long. Almost all species live primarily on carrion and feed on maggots, and so are of interest to forensic entomologists estimating the age of a corpse. The European species C. maxillosus (Linnaeus, 1758) was described in the Systema Naturae, and has been widely studied, but some other species in the genus are little known.

Creophilus was revised in 2011, and two new species described. Several others (C. insularis, C. villipennis and C. violaceus) were synonymised with C. flavipennis.

== List of species ==
- Creophilus albertisi (Fauvel, 1879)
- Creophilus erythrocephalus (Fabricius, 1775)
- Creophilus flavipennis (Hope, 1831)
- Creophilus galapagensis Clarke, 2011
- Creophilus huttoni (Broun, 1880)
- Creophilus imitator Cameron, 1952
- Creophilus incanus (Klug, 1834)
- Creophilus lanio (Erichson, 1839)
- Creophilus maxillosus (Linnaeus, 1758) - hairy rove beetle
- Creophilus oculatus (Fabricius, 1775)
- Creophilus rekohuensis Clarke, 2011
- Creophilus variegatus (Mannerheim, 1830)
