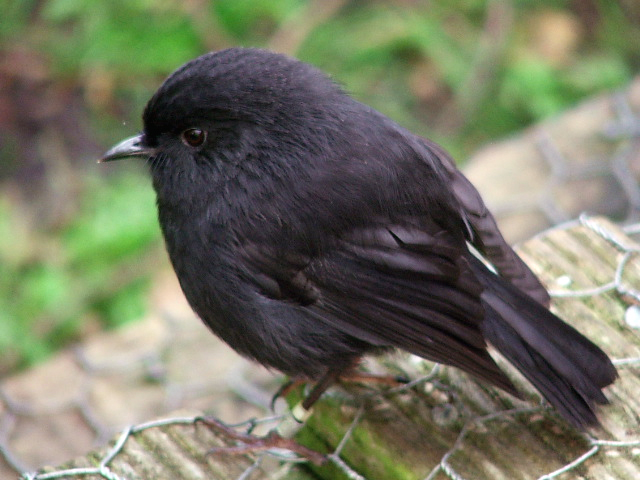

Conservation status
- Vulnerable (IUCN 3.1)

Scientific classification
- Kingdom: Animalia
- Phylum: Chordata
- Class: Aves
- Order: Passeriformes
- Family: Petroicidae
- Genus: Petroica
- Species: P. traversi

Binomial name
- Petroica traversi (Buller, 1872)
- Distribution map

Synonyms
- Miro traversi

= Black robin =

Passerine species of bird native to the Chatham Islands

The black robin or Chatham Island robin (Moriori: karure, Māori: kakaruia; Petroica traversi) is an endangered bird from the Chatham Islands off the east coast of New Zealand. It is closely related to the South Island robin (P. australis). It was first described by Walter Buller in 1872. The binomial commemorates the New Zealand botanist Henry Travers (1844–1928). Unlike its mainland counterparts, its flight capacity is somewhat reduced. Evolution in the absence of mammalian predators made it vulnerable to introduced species, such as cats and rats, and it became extinct on the main island of the Chatham group before 1871, being restricted to Little Mangere Island and Rangatira Island thereafter.

== Discovery and taxonomy ==
The first mention of the black robin in science was at a presentation given by William Travers at the Wellington Philosophical Society in 1871. He presented the findings of his son, Henry Travers, who had visited the Chatham Islands to investigate their fauna. Although Henry Travers' notes on his visit were published the following year, it was the publication of Walter Buller a month later that is considered the species' official description.

In 1905 it was believed to be completely vanished: "...the so-called black Tit or black Robin, Miro traversi, have fallen victims to man and his satellites."

== Description ==
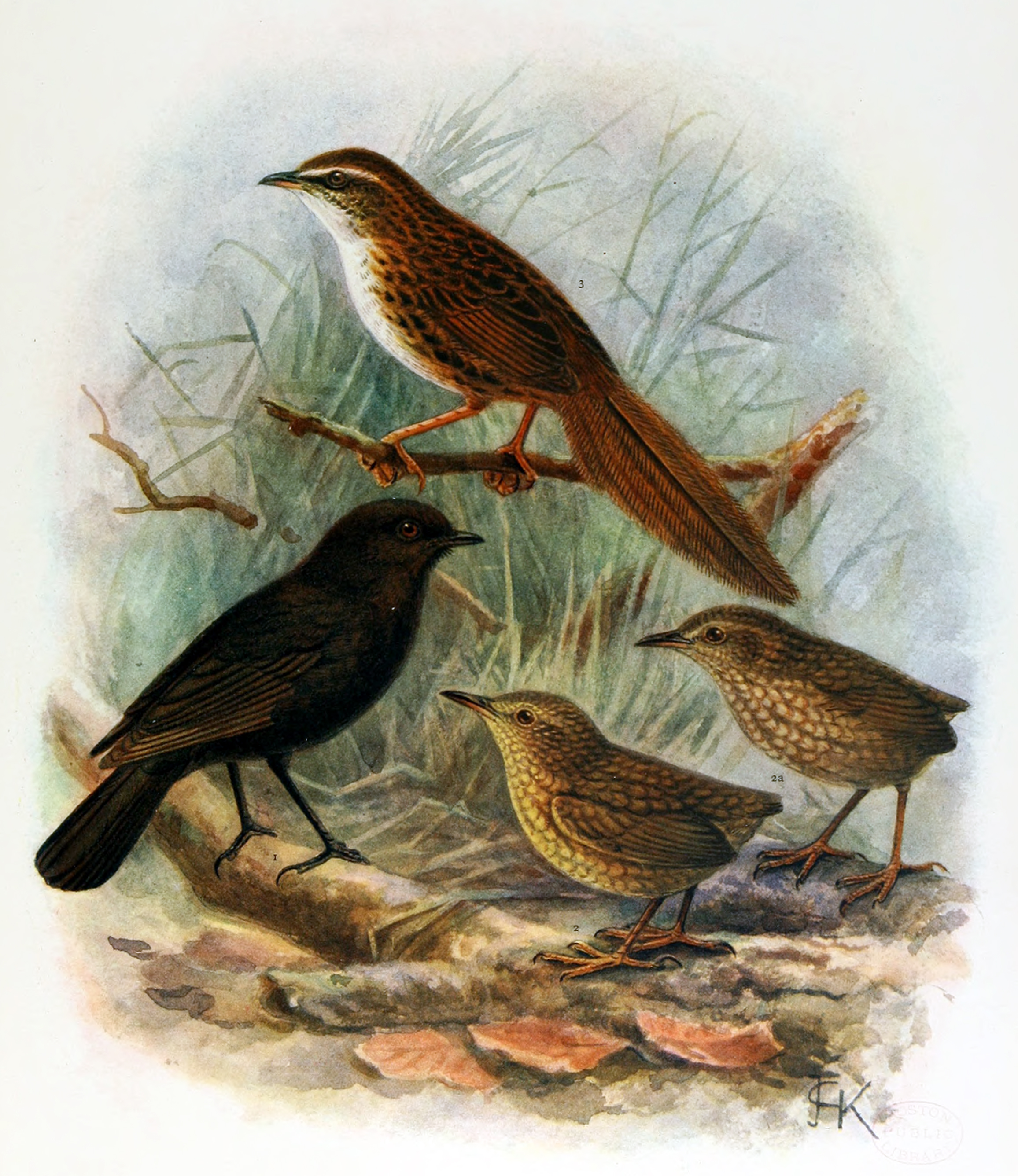
Illustration of the black robin, the Chatham fernbird, and Lyall's wren, extinct birds from its region, by John Gerrard Keulemans

The black robin is a small, sparrow-sized bird measuring 10–15 centimetres (4–6 in). Its plumage is almost entirely brownish-black, with a black bill and brownish-black yellow-soled feet.

Females are usually slightly smaller than males. Male songs are a simple phrase of 5 to 7 notes. Its call is a high-pitched single note. Their eyes are dark brown. Black robins moult between December and March.

== Habitat ==
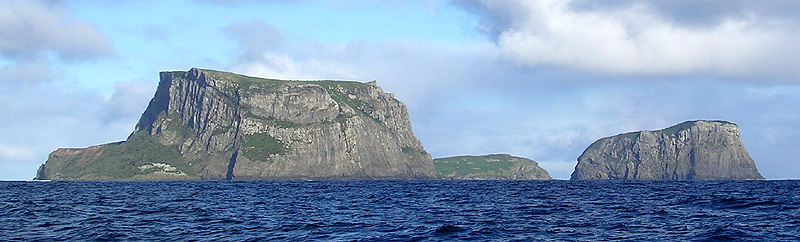
Mangere Island (left) and Little Mangere Island (right)

Black robins live in low-altitude scrub forest remnants. They are entirely insectivorous, feeding on the forest floor or on low branches, and preferring to nest in hollow trees and tree stumps. To shelter from the strong winds and rough seas around the islands, they frequent the lower branches of the forest, or in flat areas with deep litter layers. They prefer woody vegetation under the canopies of trees such as akeake.

== Ecology and behaviour ==
Black robins are territorial. Males will patrol and defend their areas. Females have been known to chase away other females. They make short flights from branch to branch and do not fly long distances.

=== Diet and feeding ===
Black robins forage in the leaf litter on the ground for grubs, cockroaches, wētā, and worms. Black robins will hunt for food during the day and night and have good night vision.

=== Breeding ===
Black robins will generally start to breed at two years of age. The female robin will make the nest, and while she lays and incubates the eggs, the male will feed the female on the nest.

Eggs are laid between early October and late December. A second clutch may be laid if the first is unsuccessful. The clutch size varies from one to three eggs, but two is typical. Eggs are creamy in colour with purple splotches. When the eggs are laid, the female will sit on them to keep them warm until they hatch, after about 18 days. Then both parents will help to feed the chicks. Young robins stay in the nest for about 23 days after hatching, but even after leaving the nest the parents will continue to feed them until they are about 65 days old. This period of parental care is longer than would normally be expected for a bird of this size. After leaving the nest, chicks often spend the first day or two on the ground learning to use their wings, and here they are exposed to predators.

=== Life expectancy ===
Survivorship between 1980 and 1991 indicates a mean life expectancy of four years. "Old Blue", the sole breeding female in 1980, lived for over 14 years. Some black robins can live from 6 to 13 years.

== Conservation and distribution ==
There are around 390 black robins as of 2026, but in 1980 only five survived on Little Mangere Island. They were saved from extinction by Don Merton and his Wildlife Service team, and by "Old Blue", the last remaining fertile female. The remaining birds were moved to Mangere Island. The team increased the annual output of Old Blue (and later other females) by removing the first clutch every year and placing the eggs in the nest of the Chatham race of the tomtit, a technique known as cross-fostering. The tomtits raised the first brood, and the black robins, having lost their eggs, relaid and raised another brood.

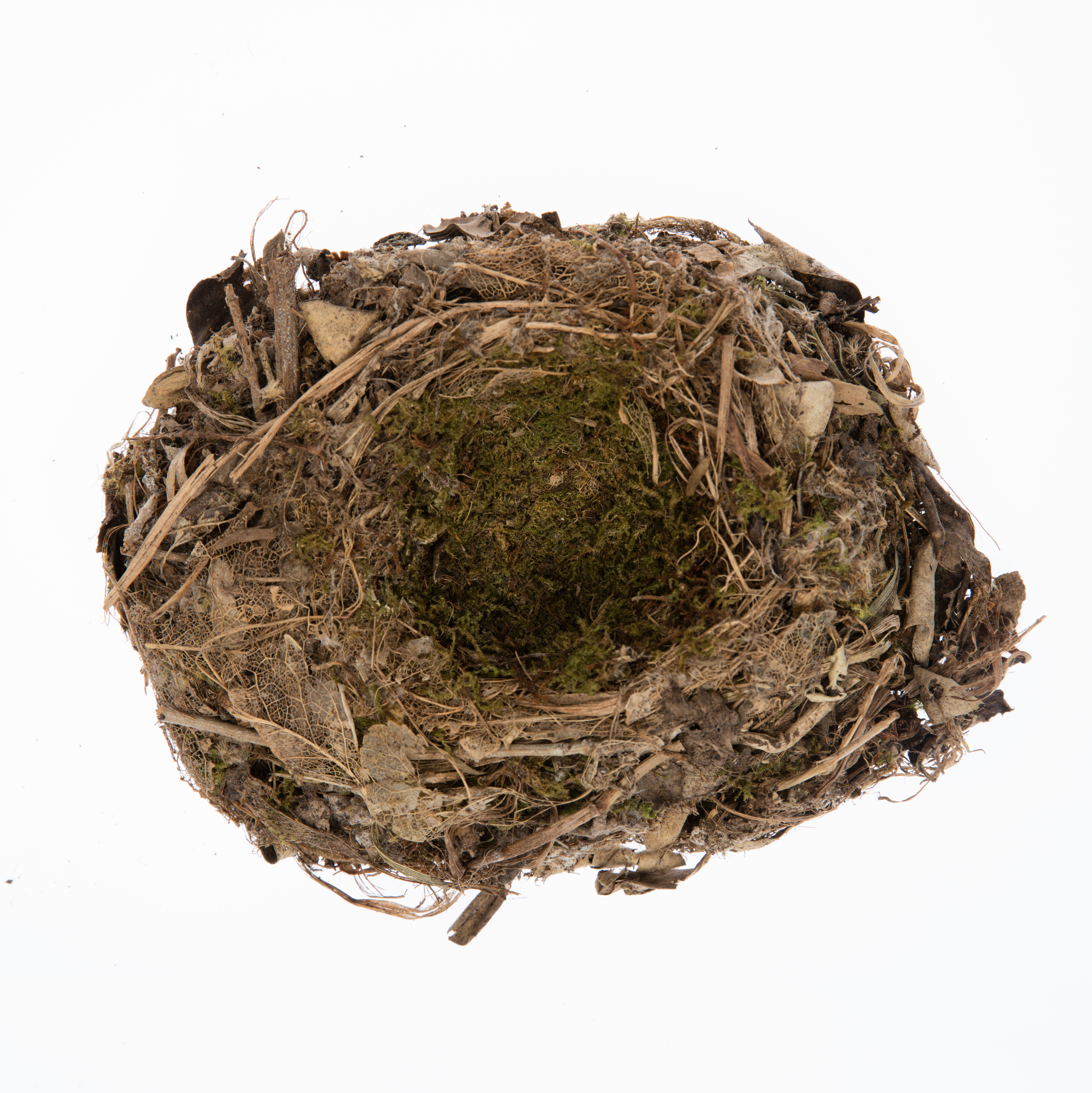
Petroica traversi nest from the collection of Auckland Museum

Many females laid eggs on the rims of nests where the eggs could not survive without help. Human conservationists pushed the eggs back into the nests where they were incubated and hatched successfully. The maladaptive gene causing this behaviour spread until over 50% of females laid rim eggs. Humans stopped pushing eggs back in time to prevent the gene spreading to all birds which could have made the birds dependent on humans indefinitely. After human intervention stopped, rim laying became less frequent, but 9% of birds still laid rim eggs as of 2011. Conservationists have faced some criticism that they may inadvertently do harm, if they allow organisms with deleterious traits to survive and perpetuate what is maladaptive.

All of the surviving black robins are descended from "Old Blue", giving little genetic variation among the population and creating the most extreme population bottleneck possible. However, this does not seem to have caused inbreeding problems, leading to speculation that the species has passed through several such population reductions in its evolutionary past, and has lost any alleles that could cause deleterious inbreeding effects. It was generally assumed that the minimum viable population protecting from inbreeding depression was around 50 individuals, but this is now known to be an inexact average, with the actual numbers being below 10 in rapidly reproducing small-island species, such as the black robin, to several hundred in long-lived continental species with a wide distribution (such as elephants or tigers).

Nest predation by introduced common starlings is the most common cause of nesting failure for black robins on Rangatira Island, with almost 21% of nests failing due to starlings. Incidents of failure caused by starlings are more common when black robins nest in cavities compared to open nests.

The species is still vulnerable, but now numbers around 300 individuals in populations on Mangere Island and Rangatira Island. Ongoing restoration of habitat and eradication of introduced predators is being undertaken, so that the population of this and other endangered Chatham endemics can be spread to several populations, decreasing the risk of extinction by natural disasters or similar stochastic events. Attempts made to establish another population in a fenced covenant on Pitt Island have failed so far.

In 2026, the black robin was elected in New Zealand as Bird of the Year.
