= Old Blue (robin) =

Female Chatham Island robin

- Born: 1970; Chatham Islands, New Zealand
- Died: 1983/1984; Chatham Islands, New Zealand
- Known for: Saving the Chatham Island robin species

Old Blue was a Chatham Island robin (also known as black robin) who at one time was the only fertile female of the species left, and who has been credited with being the saviour of her species. She lived for approximately 13 years.

== History ==
In 1979, there were just five of the Chatham Island robins left. By the time the Wildlife Service intervened in 1980, she was the only female capable of laying fertile eggs. From her, the species was saved. She is the ancestor of all living black robins, and lived from 1970 to 1983.

In 1983, she was moved to Rangatira Island so that the other breeding female, Old Green (who was not directly related to her), would have a chance to produce offspring and the remaining genetic diversity could be preserved. However, none of Old Green's offspring survived to the stage where they could breed. This resulted in Old Green's genes being lost.

Through Old Blue's breeding period, she managed to raise eleven chicks. All of the black robins today are descended from Old Blue and male Old Yellow. By early 2013, the Chatham Island robin population was approximately 250. As of 2021, the population was approximately 300, and as of 2025, approximately 350.

A book about her, Old Blue: The Rarest Bird in the World by Mary Taylor, won an award in 1994 for the Best Children's Non-fiction Title at New Zealand's National Book Awards.

== Memorial ==
A plaque dedicated to her is situated at the Chatham Islands Airport. She is also the only bird to have its death officially announced in a government parliament.

== Film ==
- Seven Black Robins – Produced by Michael Stedman, 1981

== Songs ==
In 1994, singer / songwriter Martin Curtis recorded "Yellow and Blue", a song celebrating the remarkable story of Old Blue and Old Yellow and the revival of the Chatham Islands robin. It has since been since re-released on the album The Sound of the Warning.
