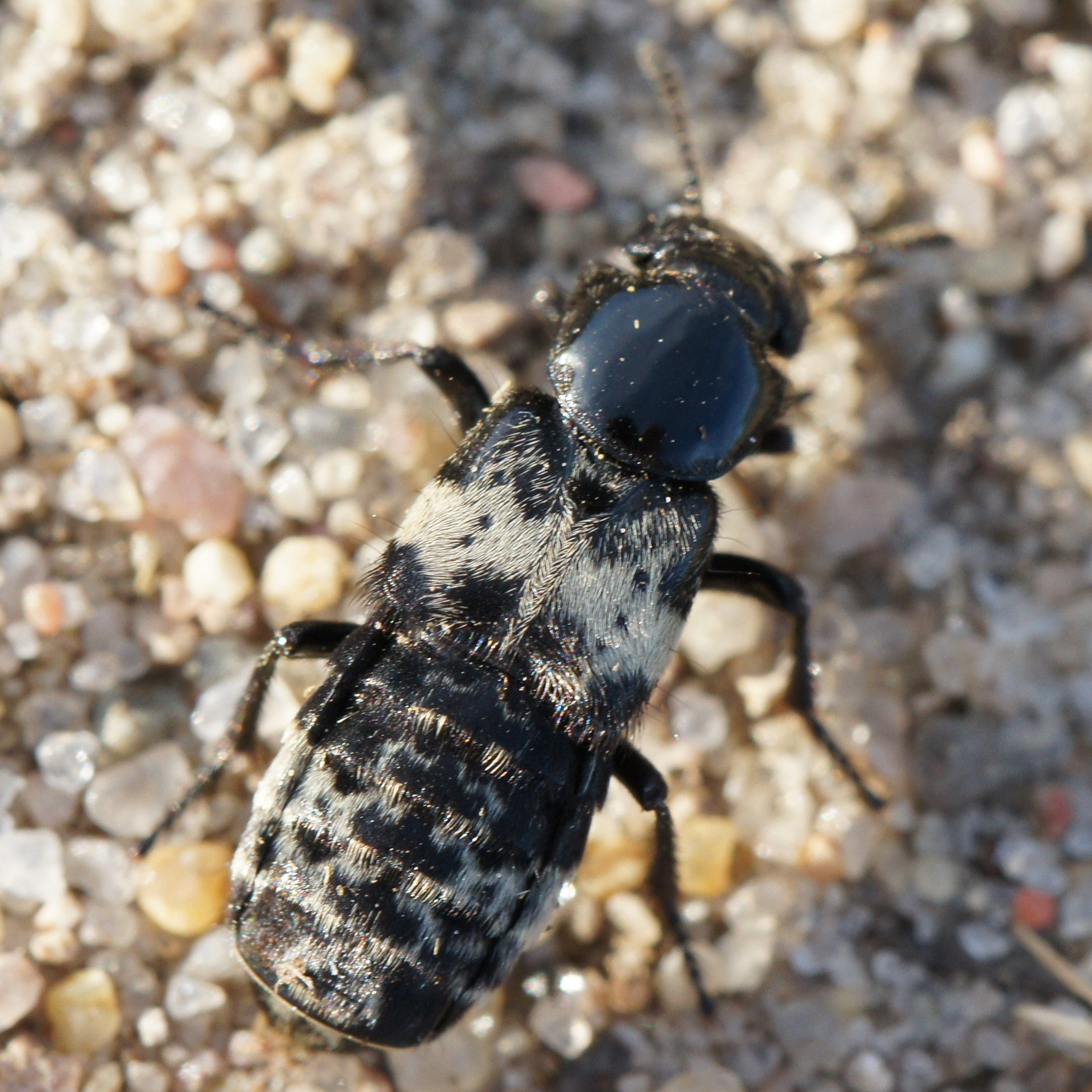

Scientific classification
- Kingdom: Animalia
- Phylum: Arthropoda
- Class: Insecta
- Order: Coleoptera
- Suborder: Polyphaga
- Infraorder: Staphyliniformia
- Family: Staphylinidae
- Genus: Creophilus
- Species: C. maxillosus

Binomial name
- Creophilus maxillosus (Linnaeus, 1758)

= Creophilus maxillosus =

Species of beetle

Creophilus maxillosus, the hairy rove beetle, is a species of rove beetle.

== Physical characteristics and life cycle ==
Larvae of the hairy rove beetle range from 20–25 millimetres (0.79–0.98 in) long and are cylindrical and stout. The adult is a shiny black color and approximately 12–18 mm (0.47–0.71 in) long. They are easily characterized by their elytra, which cover the first few abdominal segments. They have large eyes, and their mandibles close across each other in the front of the head and can inflict a painful stab if harassed or handled carelessly. Golden setae are located on posterior angles of the head and slightly on the anterior angle of the pronotum. These setae can be found on the last few abdominal segments and on elytra. The hairy rove beetle has needle-like jaws that close across in front of head and large, prominent eyes. The antennae are thick, beaded, and composed of 11 segments.

The development of eggs is around 4 days, larvae 14 days, and pupae 16 days. The eggs are milky white colored, 2 to 3 mm (0.079 to 0.118 in) long and hatch in about 3 days (depending on temperature). The larval stage lasts around 14 days. The pupae, which is around 11 mm wide lasts 16 days. The estimation of the total duration of Creophilus maxillosus lasts 37 days.

== Habitat and geography ==
These beetles can be found in woods and wherever carrion is found, usually from the spring to autumn months. These active beetles fly swiftly or run rapidly over the ground with the tip of the abdomen raised like a scorpion's stinger.

Generally, C. maxillosus are found throughout the eastern U.S. in the fall and spring, but can also be found in the summer. They are usually in wooded habitats such as forest leaf litter, decaying plant material (including fruit), and under dead tree bark. They can also be found in carrion, dung, under stones or rocks, and in fresh water areas in washed-up brown algae.

== Defense ==
Creophilus maxillosus has abdominal defensive glands used to secrete a mixture of substances that act as an irritant to predators. These glands are located beneath the abdominal tergites. When threatened or disturbed, the beetle revolves its abdomen and touches abdominal tip to offender to wipe the glands. Ants (Formica exsectoides) are a common offender and have portrayed that this defense takes place. The ants are shown to be repelled by the four major components of secretion (isoamyl acetate, iridodial, E-8-oxocitronellyl acetate, and dihydronepetalactone). Dihydroneptalactone is the main principal ingredient of chemical defense.

== Diet ==
This particular species is predacious in both the larvae and adult stages of life. The larvae and adults have long, curved mandibles which are used for chewing. They feed on carcasses (from the hours after death to the advanced stages of decomposition), as well as on maggot, specifically hairy maggot blow flies that tend to be on dead animals.

Hairy rove beetles at four days and larva at seven days under rabbit carrion.

== Control ==
The hairy rove beetle is considered beneficial in the environment because it is a successful scavenger and predator. However, infestation of houses has been reported by this beetle. A reason why C. maxillosus infests houses is not known for certain, but a study of rearing this beetle in the laboratory has shown that adults like to lay eggs in fresh sand and not sand that is old or contaminated. To solve the problem of infestation certain pesticides have been found to affect the adults and larvae of this beetle and can be used to control their numbers. Atroban, a chemical pesticide composed of permethrin (0.05%), decreases the number of adults and larvae of the family Staphylinidae. Short term reductions of this family were caused by a chemical named dimethoate (0.05%). Both of these pesticides were tested on moist spots on poultry dung.

== Forensics ==
Creophilus maxillosus is one of the many forensically important insect species commonly encountered during crime scene investigations. This species can be used in investigative forensic entomology to aid in establishing a time of colonization or post mortem interval (PMI), both of which usually prove helpful in general crime scene investigation. Hairy rove beetles are considered forensically important, however; their use is somewhat limited due to their transient nature and widespread distribution. Croephilus maxillosus frequency at crime scene investigations conducted in their natural habitat often disqualifies them from being an indicator of body relocation. Creophilus maxillosus forensic relevance, however, is proportionally associated with predation of Diptera larvae, which is one of the most important secondary predations encountered at crime scenes.

Both larvae and adults of the predatory Creophilus maxillosus feed on the organic remains of carrion as well as nutrient-packed dipteran larvae. Their appearance in the 'common' faunal succession usually follows the first Diptera larvae colonization and continues throughout the later stages of decomposition. The presence of C. maxillosus on carrion is sometimes associated with a marked reduction or in some instances an unexplained absence of fly larvae. This predation causes an overall misrepresentation of the overall entomofaunical succession, and must be considered in some instances.

=== Case studies ===
A study carried out in Central Europe explored insect succession on near identical swine carcasses set out in a pine-oak forest, hornbeam-oak forest, and an alder forest in western Poland. The results show that C. maxillosus adults begin to appear during the ‘late-bloating’, ‘early-active’ phase and were present up to the earlier stages of the ‘remains’ phase. On average, they were first seen after about 6 days of decomposition (range of 5–7 days of decomposition ) and the last C. maxillosus adults were observed on average on day 25 of decomposition (range of 14–38 days of decomposition ). C. maxillosus larvae began to appear after an average of 17 days of decomposition (range of 13–25 days of decomposition) and were present until day 40 of decomposition (range 34–50 days of decomposition).
