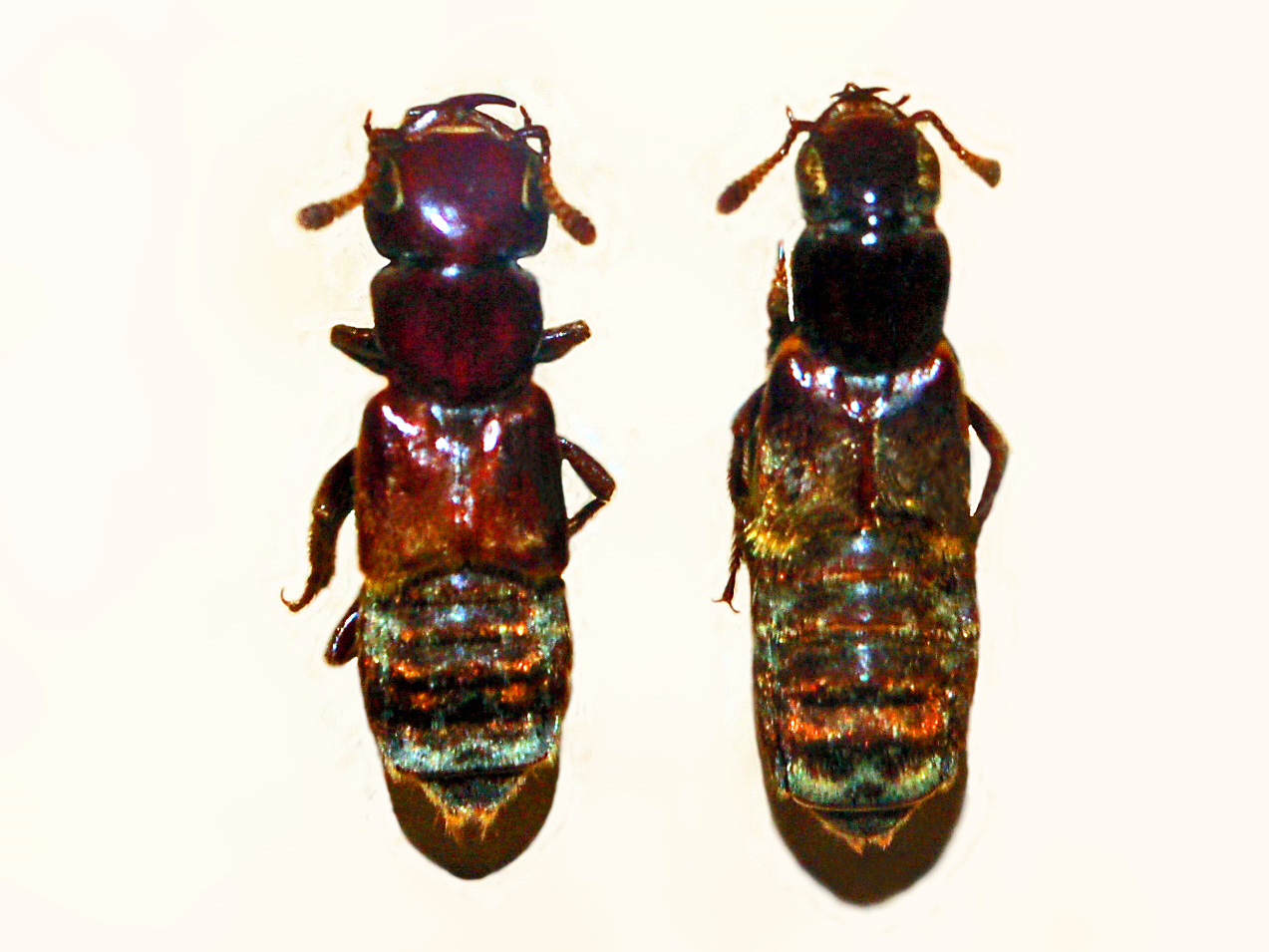
- Creophilus variegatus from Peru. Male and female.

Scientific classification
- Kingdom: Animalia
- Phylum: Arthropoda
- Clade: Pancrustacea
- Class: Insecta
- Order: Coleoptera
- Suborder: Polyphaga
- Infraorder: Staphyliniformia
- Family: Staphylinidae
- Genus: Creophilus
- Species: C. variegatus

Binomial name
- Creophilus variegatus Mannerheim, 1830

= Creophilus variegatus =

Species of beetle

Creophilus variegatus is a beetle of the Staphylinidae family, Staphylininae subfamily. This species occurs in South America (especially in Brazil and Peru).
