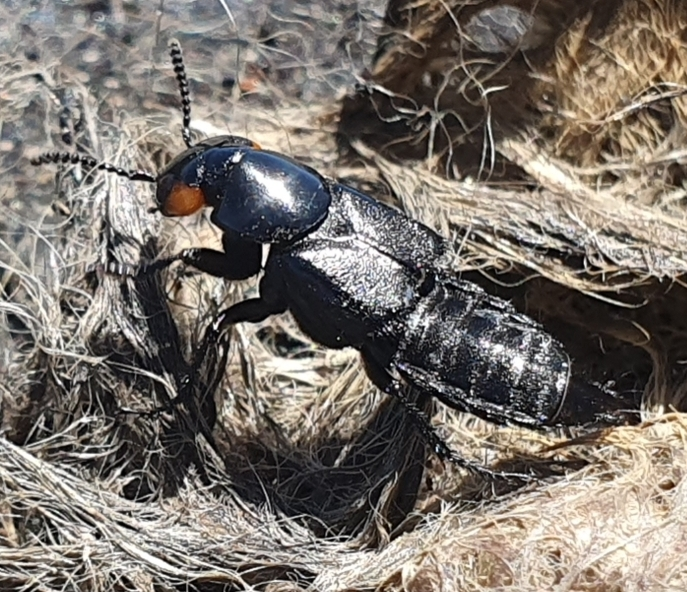
- Creophilus oculatus on a carcase

Scientific classification
- Kingdom: Animalia
- Phylum: Arthropoda
- Clade: Pancrustacea
- Class: Insecta
- Order: Coleoptera
- Suborder: Polyphaga
- Infraorder: Staphyliniformia
- Family: Staphylinidae
- Genus: Creophilus
- Species: C. oculatus

Binomial name
- Creophilus oculatus (Fabricius, 1775)

Synonyms
- Staphylinus oculatus Fabricius, 1775

= Creophilus oculatus =

Species of rove beetle

Creophilus oculatus or devil's coach horse is a species of large carrion-feeding rove beetle endemic to New Zealand.

== Taxonomy ==
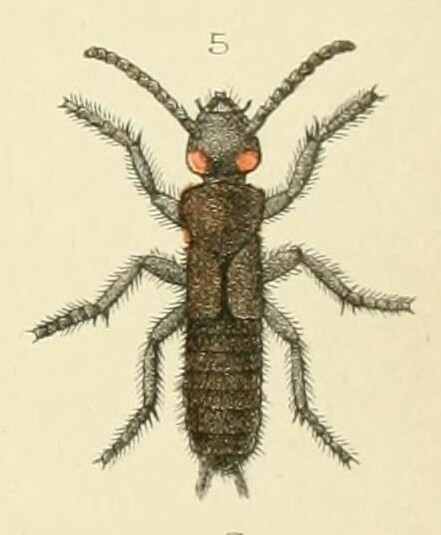
Illustration by Hudson in An Elementary Manual of New Zealand Entomology (1892)

Creophilus oculatus was described and named by Danish zoologist Johann Christian Fabricius as Staphylinus oculatus. The lectotype and two paralectotype specimens were designated by David J. Clarke in 2011 and are housed at The Natural History Museum, London, UK (BMNH). These were some of the first insect specimens collected in New Zealand by Joseph Banks and Daniel Solander in 1769–1770 on Cook's first voyage to New Zealand. The specimens of C. oculatus were likely collected from dried or decaying animal materials which also contained these carrion beetles.

The name "devil's coach horse" is used for Ocypus olens, another large species of rove beetle found in Europe and North America, so named because of a medieval belief that the Devil took this form to carry away the corpses of sinners. The name probably derived from the threatening appearance of O. olens, which is Britain's largest rove beetle species.

== Description ==
At approximately 20 mm in length, Creophilus oculatus is the largest of the over 1000 species of rove beetle found in New Zealand. It is elongate, black, and shiny, with reduced elytra characteristic of the Staphylinidae, covering one third of its abdomen. Despite its reduced wing covers it is a strong if reluctant flier, preferring to escape by running with the abdomen curled over its back, and when flying is attracted to lights. The orange-red 'spots' behind the eyes distinguish Creophilus oculatus from all other Creophilus species (except rarely C. huttoni).

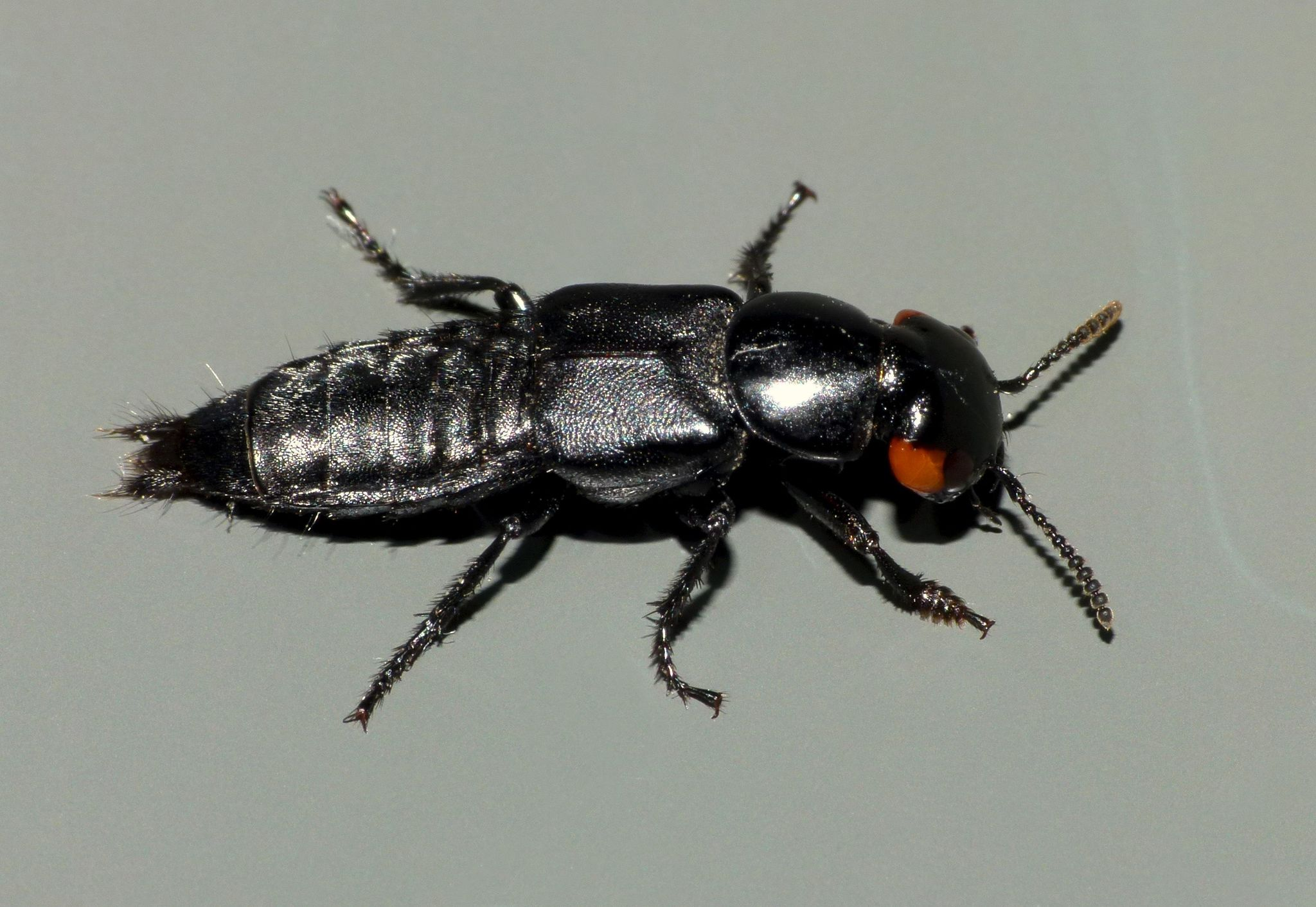
Wings furled

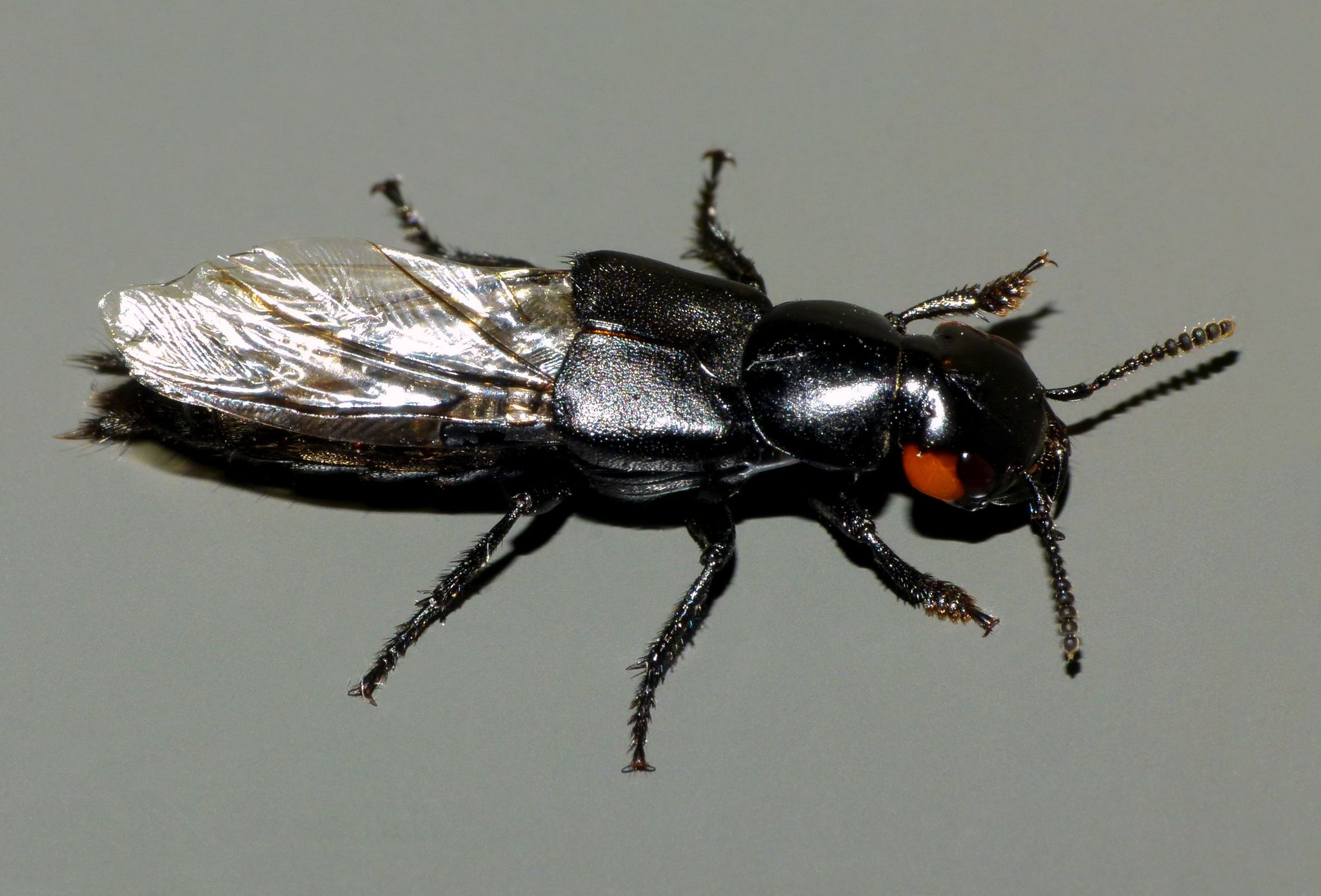
Wings unfurled

== Distribution ==
The original description listed both Australia and New Zealand as the collection localities for Creophilus oculatus (as "nova Hollandia et Zelandia"). The species has been variously considered to be indigenous, adventive or endemic to New Zealand, and sometimes also indigenous to Australia. The most recent interpretation of the geographical range of Creophilus oculatus is that it is endemic to New Zealand.

Creophilus oculatus is common and widespread throughout New Zealand in the North, South and Stewart Islands, as well as the Chatham Islands, Kermadec Islands, Snares Islands, and Auckland Islands. The species is found in a wide range of habitats including pasture, beach, forest, swamp, tussock land and penguin rookeries, from sea level to 2400 m ASL.

Creophilus oculatus has been collected throughout the year, most commonly from Sept–May.

== Biology ==
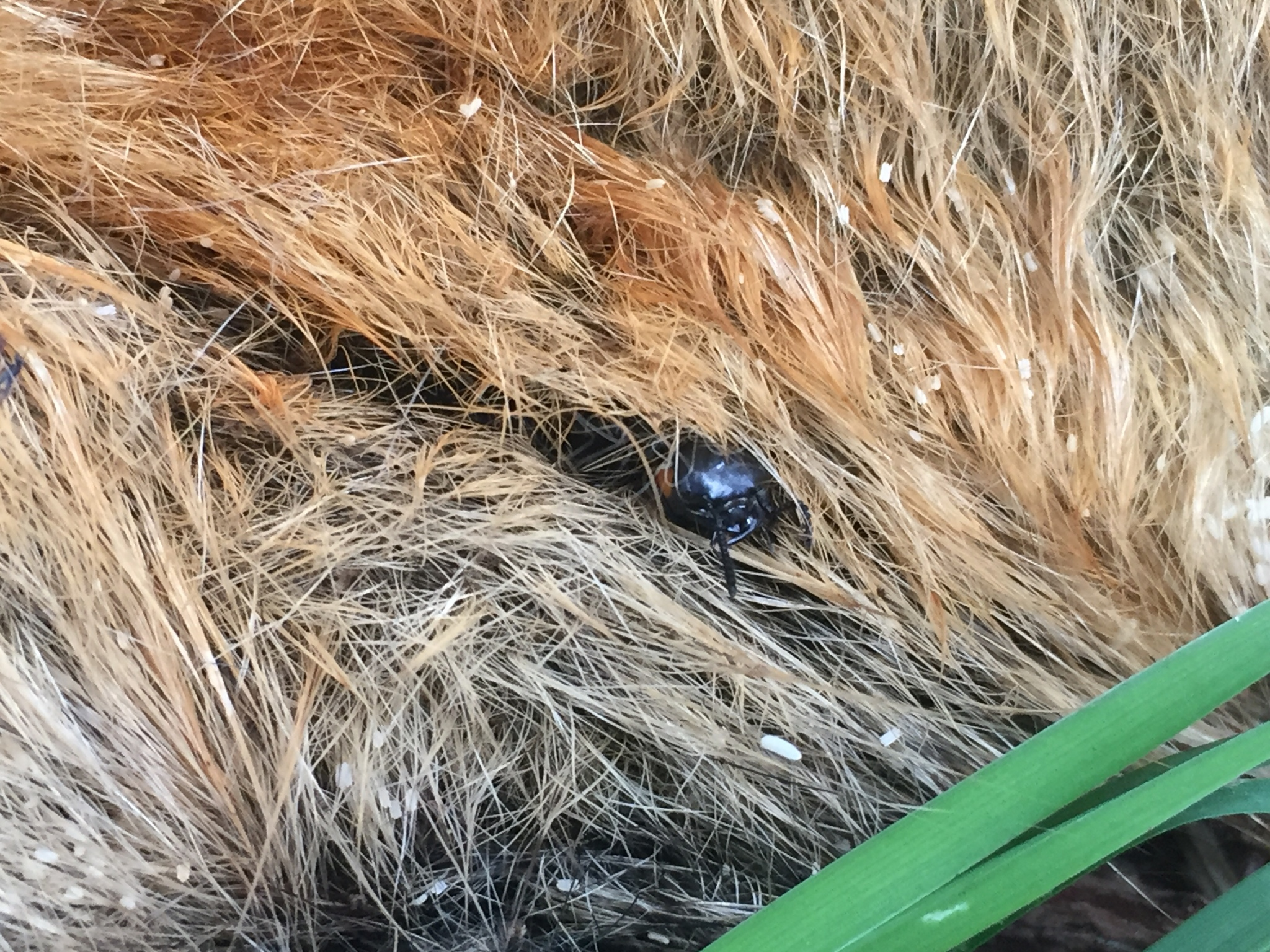
C. oculatus on a dead possum

Creophilus oculatus is a carrion beetle, often been collected from carrion, carrion-baited pitfall traps, or rotting plants, to which it is attracted by smell. The adults are one of the first insect species to arrive at a dead animal. Rather than feed directly on carrion, they consume carrion-feeding insects, especially the maggots of blowflies, and have been observed tearing open flies with their curved jaws to feed on their eggs. These beetles discharge an unpleasant-smelling white substance—described as smelling like "rotten fish"—from glands on their abdomen when threatened.

Adults lay their eggs in a carcase, and the larvae are also predators of carrion-feeding insects. Although adult and larval stages of C. oculatus are documented and illustrated, the pupae are unknown.
