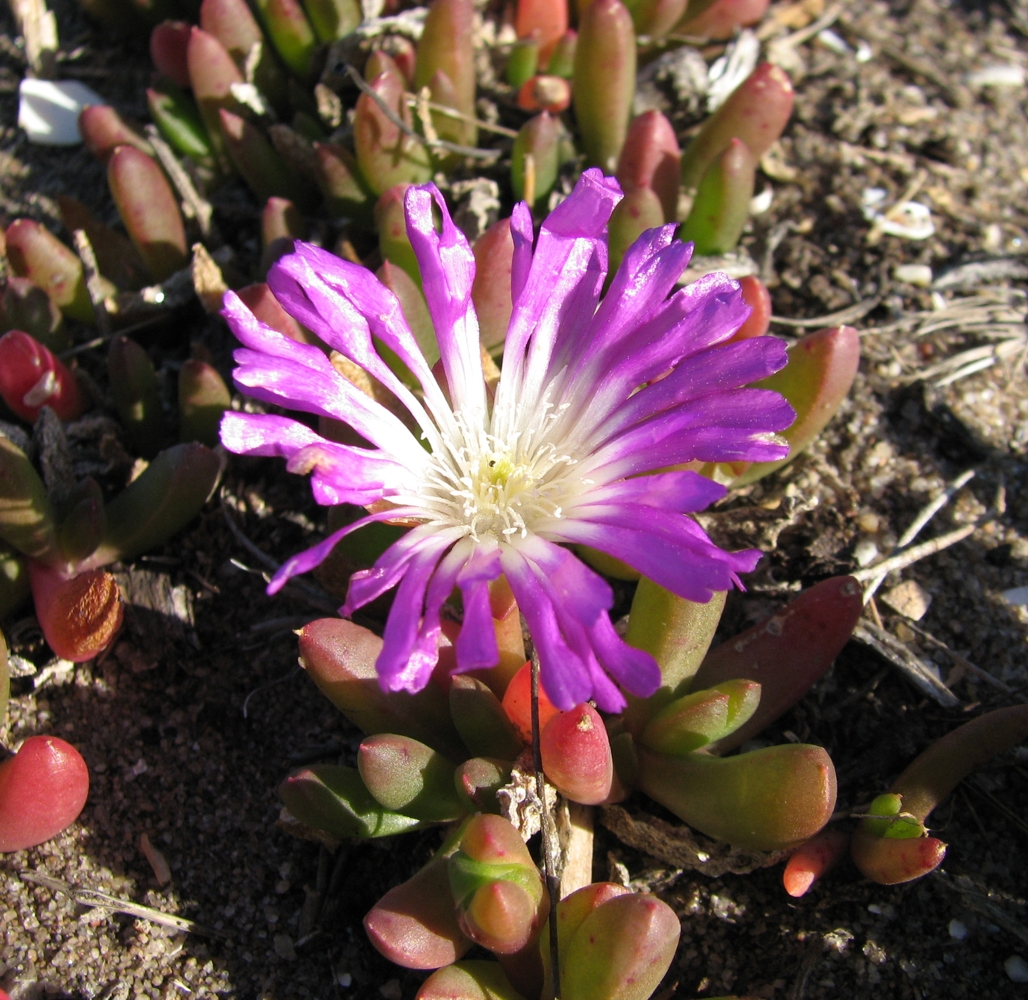

Scientific classification
- Kingdom: Plantae
- Clade: Tracheophytes
- Clade: Angiosperms
- Clade: Eudicots
- Order: Caryophyllales
- Family: Aizoaceae
- Genus: Disphyma
- Species: D. crassifolium
- Subspecies: D. c. subsp. clavellatum

Trinomial name
- Disphyma crassifolium subsp. clavellatum (Haw.) Chinnock

= Disphyma crassifolium subsp. clavellatum =

Subspecies of succulent

Disphyma crassifolium subsp. clavellatum is the subspecies of Disphyma crassifolium (round-leaved pigface) that occurs in Australia and New Zealand. It is sometimes known by the common name rounded noon-flower

== Description ==
It grows as a prostrate, succulent shrub or annual herb, from two to 30 centimetres high. Unlike the other pigfaces its leaves are round in cross-section. Flowers are pink, purple or violet.

== Taxonomy ==
This subspecies was first published under the name Mesembryanthemum australe by Georg Forster in 1786, based on New Zealand material. Forster failed to give a description, however, so valid publication of the name falls to William Aiton, who published a description in 1789. In 1803, Adrian Hardy Haworth published M. clavellatum based on plants raised at Kew from seeds collected in Australia. In 1830, N. E. Brown transferred M. australe into Disphyma as D. australe. In 1971 Robert Chinnock published a new species name, D. blackii, for some New Zealand material, and five years later he transferred M. clavellatum to Disphyma.

In the early 1980s, Hugh Francis Glen determined, on the basic of a multivariate analysis, that Disphyma was monotypic. All other names were therefore given synonymy with D. crassifolium. This situation remained until 1986, when it was decided that the South African populations differed sufficiently from the Australian and New Zealand populations to merit distinct subspecies. D. crassifolium subsp. clavellatum was then erected to encompass the Australian and New Zealand populations, with the autonym D. crassifolium subsp. crassifolium defined as encompassing the South African plants.

== Distribution and habitat ==
Disphyma crassifolium is widely distributed in Australia and New Zealand. It grows in saline areas such as coastal dunes and samphire flats, and tolerates a range of soils including sand, loam and clay.

== Uses ==
The leaves have become a popular native vegetable in Australia marketed under the name "karkalla". It typically has a salty flavour and can be used fresh or as a pickled ingredient.
