= Little Mangere Island =

Island in the Chatham Islands, New Zealand

Tapuaenuku (Moriori/Māori)
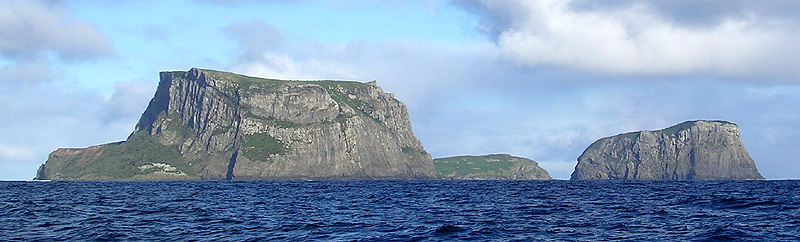
- Mangere Island (left) and Little Mangere (right)

- Map showing location of Little Mangere Island

Geography
- Coordinates: 44.2780°S 176.3158°W
- Area: 15 ha (37 acres)
- Highest elevation: 214 m (702 ft)

Administration
- New Zealand

Little Mangere is a small island of the Chatham Archipelago, just off the western end of Mangere Island, about 4 km (2½ mi) west of Pitt Island and 45 kilometres (28 mi) south-east of the town of Waitangi on Chatham Island. The island is called Tapuaenuku in Moriori and Māori, and was formerly called The Fort. The archipelago is part of New Zealand and is located about 800 kilometres (500 mi) to the east of the South Island.

Little Mangere has less than 15 hectares (37 acres). It has a relatively flat interior surrounded by steep cliffs, and its highest point is 214 metres (702 ft) above sea level.

Little Mangere is privately owned and was once the last refuge of the few remaining Black robin until they were transferred to nearby Mangere Island and South East Island as part of a species recovery plan in the early 1980s. The island still hosts the largest sooty shearwater (Puffinus griseus) colony in the Chathams group.

== See also ==
- Desert island
- List of islands
