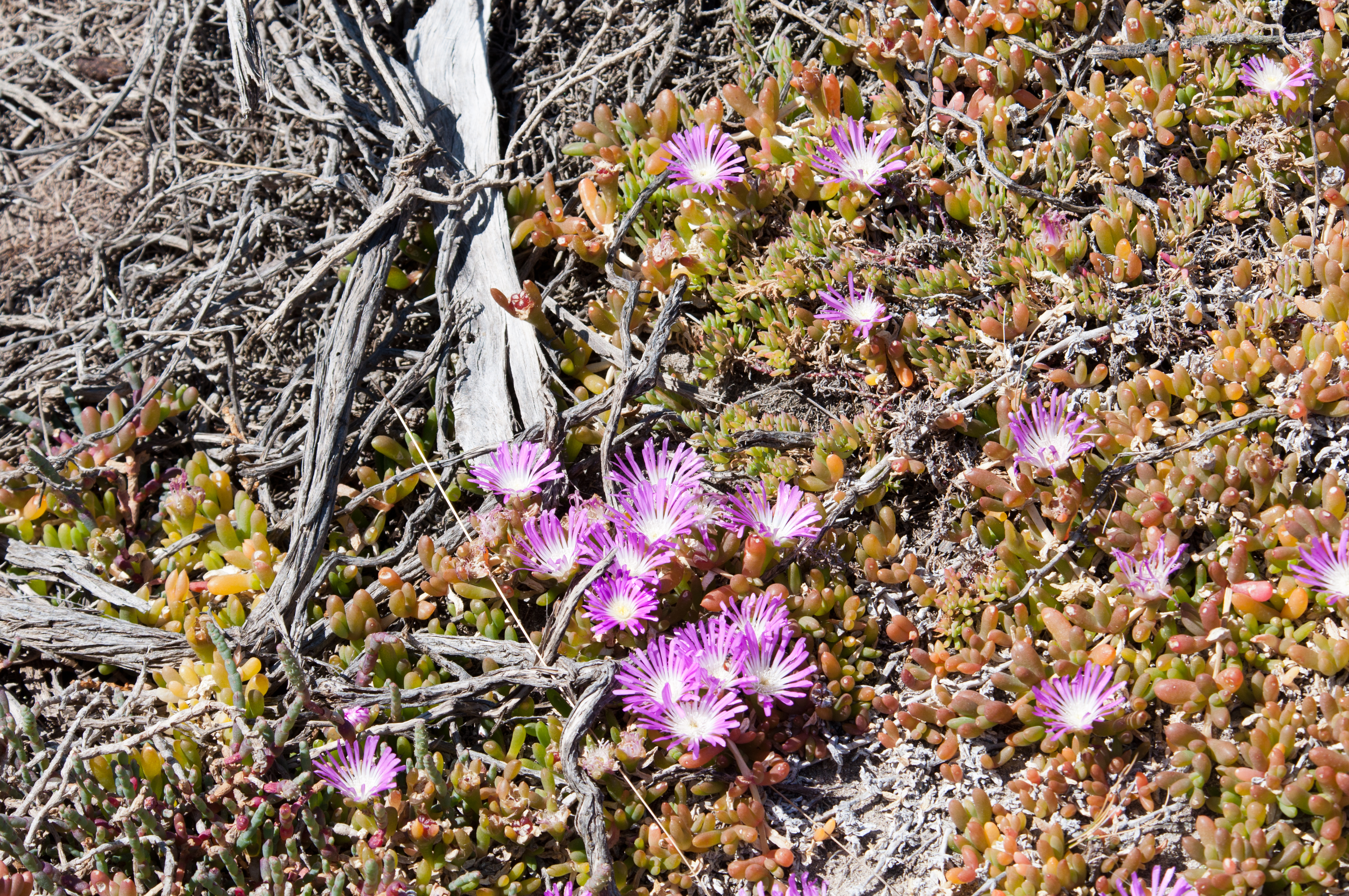
- Disphyma crassifolium

Scientific classification
- Kingdom: Plantae
- Clade: Tracheophytes
- Clade: Angiosperms
- Clade: Eudicots
- Order: Caryophyllales
- Family: Aizoaceae
- Subfamily: Ruschioideae
- Tribe: Ruschieae
- Genus: Disphyma
- Species: D. crassifolium

Binomial name
- Disphyma crassifolium (L.) L.Bolus

= Disphyma crassifolium =

Round-leaved pigface

Species of succulent

Disphyma crassifolium, commonly known as round-leaved pigface or salty fingers is a species of flowering plant in the family Aizoaceae native to Australia and the Cape Provinces of South Africa. It is a prostrate, succulent annual shrub or short-lived perennial plant with stems up to 2 m (6 ft 7 in) long, leaves that are three-sided in cross-section with a rounded lower angle, and purple daisy-like flowers with staminodes up to 30 mm (1.2 in) long.

== Description ==
Disphyma crassifolium is a prostrate, succulent, annual or short-lived perennial shrub that typically grows to a height of 2–30 cm (0.79–11.81 in) and has stems up to 2 m (6 ft 7 in) long. Its leaves are club-shaped, more or less round to three-sided in cross-section, 5–70 mm (0.20–2.76 in) long and 1–7 mm (0.039–0.276 in) wide. The flowers are 20–50 mm (0.79–1.97 in) wide with a perianth tube 6–12 mm (0.24–0.47 in) wide, the longer lobes 2–30 mm (0.079–1.181 in) long with purple, petal-like staminodes 110–30 mm (4.3–1.2 in) long that are white on the lower surface. Flowering mainly occurs from October to February and the fruit is a conical capsule that is about 10 mm (0.39 in) long and wide before opening.

== Taxonomy ==
Disphyma crassifolium was first published in 1753 as Mesembryanthemum crassifolium by Carl Linnaeus in Species Plantarum from species collected in southern Africa. In 1925, Nicholas Edward Brown raised the genus Disphyma in The Gardeners' Chronicle and in 1927 Harriet Margaret Louisa Bolus moved Linnaeus's M. crassifolium into the new genus as Disphyma crassifolium in the botanical magazine Flowering Plants of South Africa.

In 1803, Adrian Hardy Haworth described Mesmbryanthemum clavellatum in his book Miscellanea Naturalia, sive Dissertationes Variae ad Historiam Naturalem Spectantes from plants raised from seed collected in Australia by Robert Brown. In 1976, Robert Chinnock moved M. clavellatum to the genus Disphyma as D. clavellatum in the New Zealand Journal of Botany. Then, in 1986, John Peter Jessop reduced Disphyma clavellatum to a subspecies, Disphyma crassifolium subsp. clavellatum in Flora of South Australia, a name accepted by the Australian Plant Census and Plants of the World Online.

== Distribution and habitat ==
Disphyma crassifolium is widely distributed in South Africa and Australia. It grows in saline areas such as coastal dunes and samphire flats, and tolerates a range of soils including sand, loam and clay.
