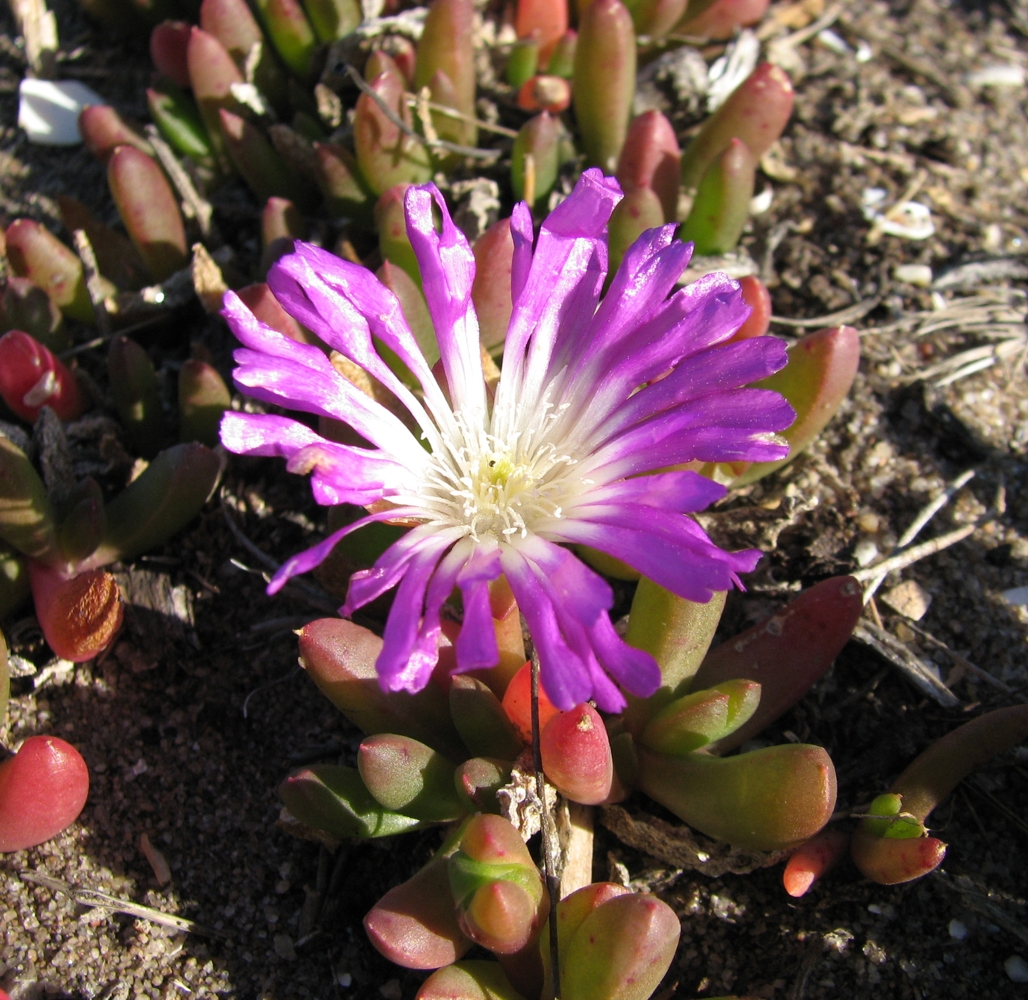
- Disphyma crassifolium subsp. clavellatum

Scientific classification
- Kingdom: Plantae
- Clade: Tracheophytes
- Clade: Angiosperms
- Clade: Eudicots
- Order: Caryophyllales
- Family: Aizoaceae
- Subfamily: Ruschioideae
- Tribe: Ruschieae
- Genus: Disphyma; N.E.Br.

= Disphyma =

Genus of succulents

Disphyma is a genus of flowering plants in the family Aizoaceae that are native to New Zealand, Australia, and the Cape Provinces of South Africa. Plants in this genus are prostrate, annual or short-lived perennial shrubs with succulent leaves and daisy-like flowers arranged singly on the ends of shoots with petal-like staminodes, many stamens and usually five styles.

== Description ==
Plants in the genus Disphyma are prostrate, annual plants or short-lived perennials with branches that root at nodes. The leaves are arranged alternately and fused at the base, succulent and round to more or less triangular in cross-section. The flowers are usually arranged singly, sometimes in pairs or three, on the ends of branches or on short side shoots, each flower on a pedicel up to 100 mm (3.9 in) long. The perianth is tube-shaped with five sepals, two larger and leaf-like and three smaller, slightly succulent and not leaf-like. There are many petal-like, purplish staminodes in two rows and many stamens in four or five rows. The ovary is inferior and there are usually five styles. The fruit is a capsule.

== Taxonomy ==
The genus Disphyma was first formally described in 1925 by N. E. Brown in The Gardeners' Chronicle.

As at October 2020, Plants of the World Online accepts four species:

- Disphyma australe (Sol. ex Aiton) J.M.Black that is endemic to New Zealand;
- Disphyma crassifolium (L.) L.Bolus that is native to Australia and the Cape Province in southern Africa;
- Disphyma dunsdonii L.Bolus that is endemic to the Cape Province;
- Disphyma papillatum Chinnock that is endemic to the Chatham Islands on New Zealand;

Plants of the World Online also accepts two subspecies:

- Disphyma australe subsp. stricticaule Chinnock that is endemic to Kermadec Island of New Zealand;
- Disphyma crassifolium subsp. clavellatum (Haw.) Chinnock that is endemic to Australia and has been introduced to the South Island of New Zealand.
