= Mangere Island =

Māngere (Māori) Maung' Rē (Moriori)
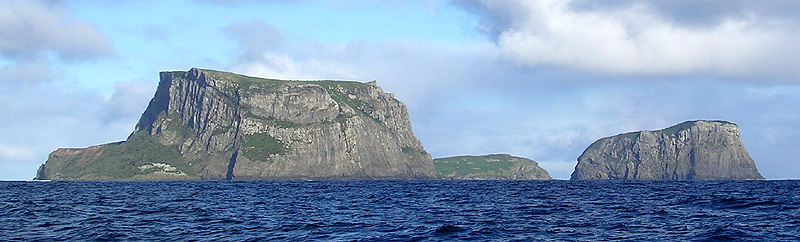
- Mangere Island (left) and Little Mangere (right)

- Map showing location of Mangere Island

Geography
- Coordinates: 44.2695°S 176.2945°W
- Archipelago: Chatham Islands
- Area: 1.13 km^{2} (0.44 sq mi)
- Highest elevation: 292 m (958 ft)
- Highest point: Whakapa

Administration
- New Zealand

Demographics
- Population: 0

Mangere Island (Moriori: Maung' Rē) is part of the Chatham Islands archipelago, located about 800 kilometres (500 mi) east of New Zealand's South Island and has an area of 113 hectares (279 acres). The island lies off the west coast of Pitt Island, 45 kilometres (28 mi) south-east of the main settlement in the Chathams, Waitangi, on Chatham Island.

Mangere and nearby Tapuaenuku (Little Mangere) are the eroded remains of an ancient volcano of Pliocene age. Whakapa, the island's highest point, is 292 metres (958 ft) above sea level.

Forested until the 1890s, the island was largely cleared for sheep grazing. Rabbits and then cats were also introduced but later died out. Farmed until 1966, the island was then purchased by the New Zealand government and gazetted as a Nature Reserve. The last sheep were removed in 1968 and restoration of the island started in 1973 and is ongoing. Several endemic Chatham Island bird species have since been reintroduced to the island, Chatham snipe in 1970, black robin in 1976, Chatham tomtit in 1987 and shore plover in the 1990s.

== See also ==
- List of islands of New Zealand
- List of islands
- Desert island
