= Rangatira Island =

Island of eastern New Zealand

South East / Hokorereoro / Rangatira Island
- Map showing location of South East Island/Rangatira

Geography
- Coordinates: 44.3465°S 176.1721°W
- Archipelago: Chatham Islands
- Area: 2.18 km^{2} (0.84 sq mi)
- Highest point: 224

Administration
- New Zealand

Demographics
- Population: 0

Hokorereoro, Rangatira, or South East Island is the third largest island in the Chatham Islands archipelago, and covers an area of 218 hectares (539 acres). It lies 800 kilometres (497 mi) east of New Zealand's South Island off the south-east coast of Pitt Island, 55 kilometres (34 mi) south-east of the main settlement, Waitangi, on Chatham Island.

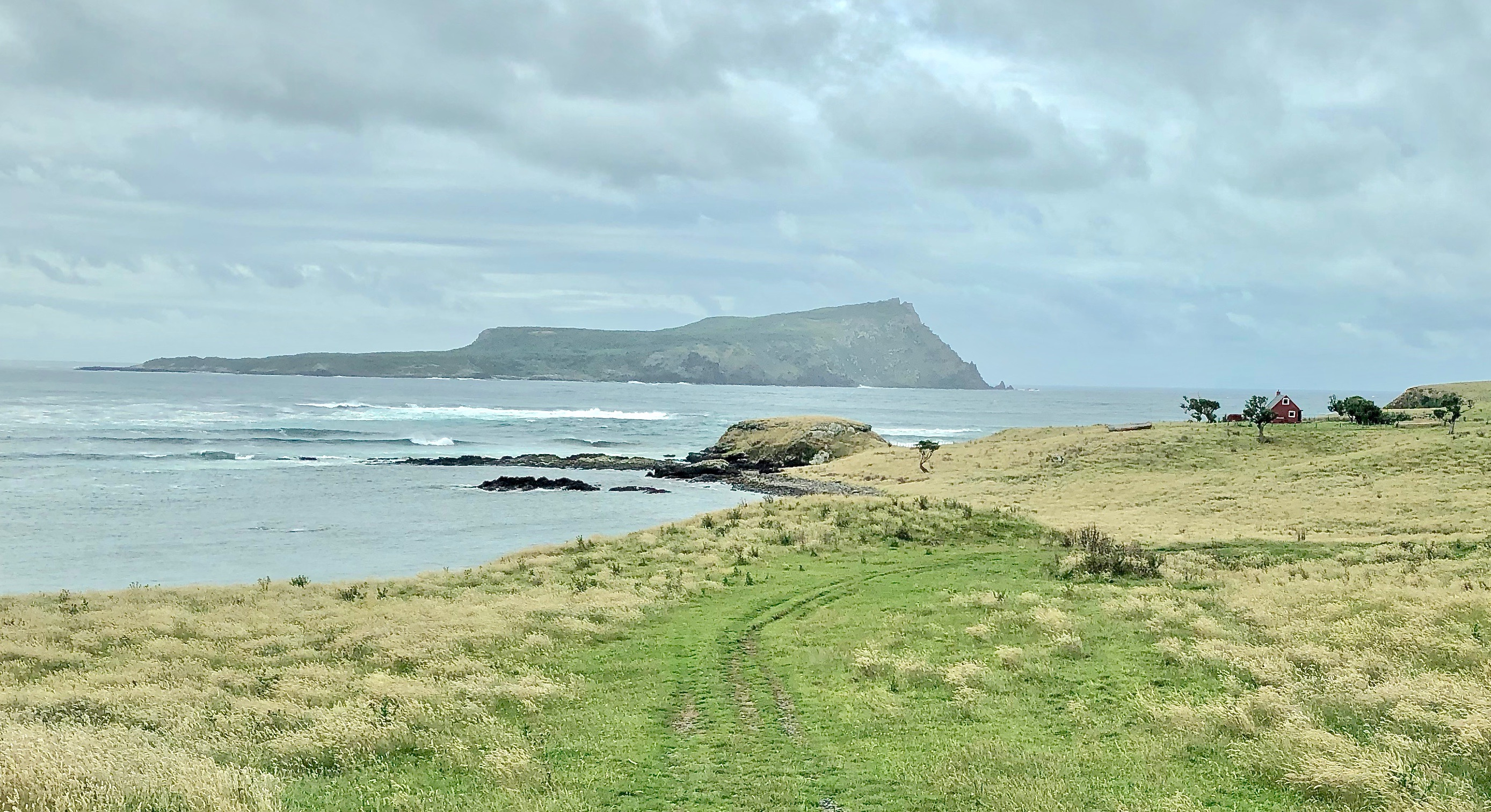
Glory Bay and Rangatira Island

== History ==
According to oral traditions, ancient Moriori used to travel to Hokorereoro by canoe to capture muttonbirds. However, there is no material evidence of those expeditions, such as dendroglyphs (tree carvings) or petroglyphs (rock art).

European farmers ran sheep, goats and cattle on Hokorereoro until the 1960s when the last of these were removed. Today the island is a gazetted nature reserve, and access to the island is restricted and controlled by the Department of Conservation.

=== Scientific expedition ===
In 1954 scientists on the 1954 Chatham Islands expedition visited the island.

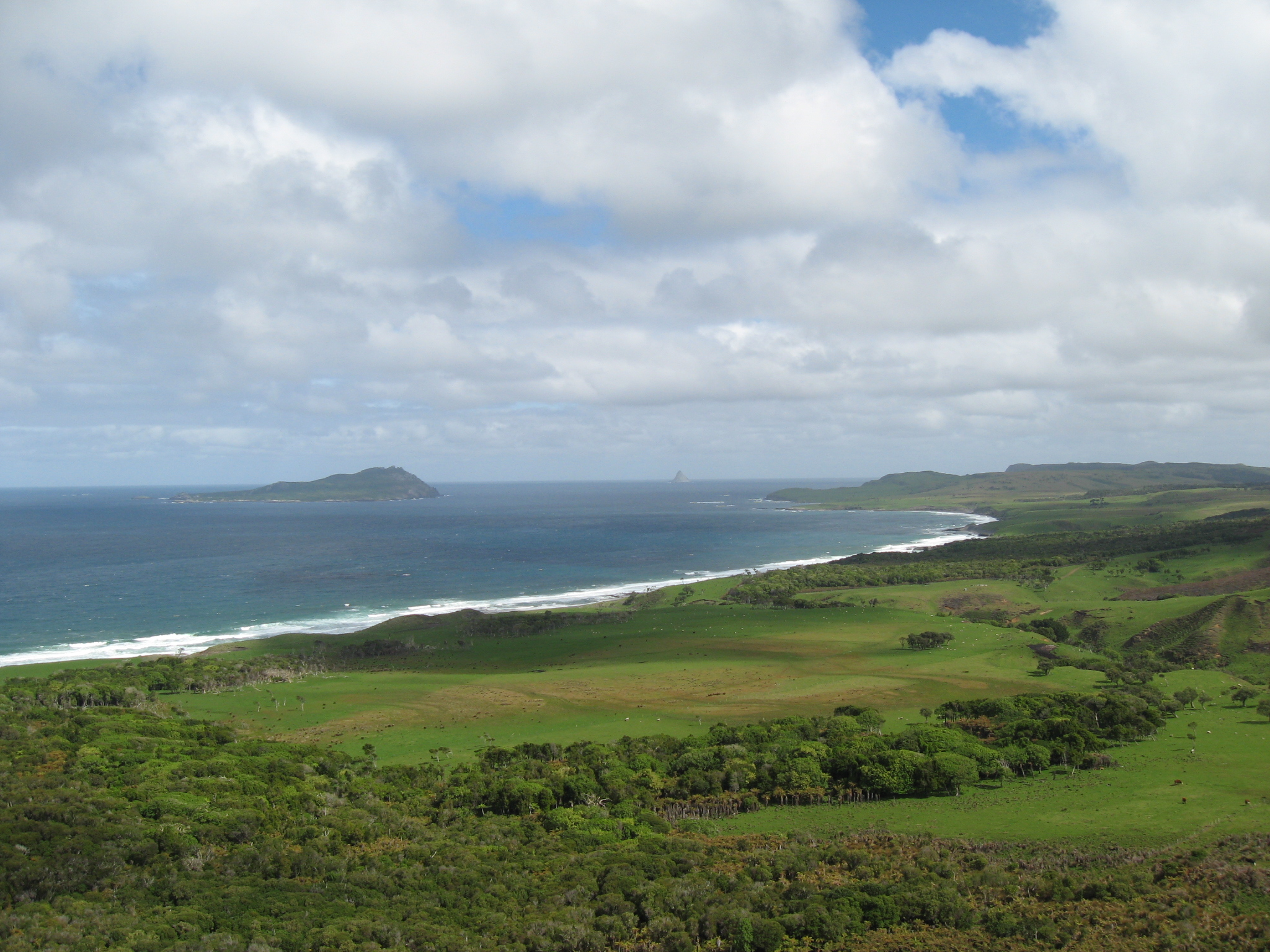
On the left is Rangatira, and in the distance in the middle of photograph "The Pyramid" (Tarakoikoia)

Hokorereoro is host to several rare and endemic species of birds and plants, and is a sanctuary for endangered invertebrates such as the giant stick insect, coxella weevil, the flightless rove beetle Creophilus rekohuensis, and the Pitt Island longhorn beetle. It is also locally notorious for the presence of the Rangatira spider, one of New Zealand's largest spiders.

Hokorereoro is most famous for being the habitat for the endangered black robin, rescued from near extinction by a dedicated team led by Don Merton, who used foster parent birds to raise the chicks of black robin. The island has been identified as an Important Bird Area by BirdLife International because it supports large breeding colonies of broad-billed prions (330,000 pairs), Chatham petrels (up to 1000 pairs) and white-faced storm petrels (840,000 pairs). Hokorereoro was the stronghold and last remaining breeding site for the Chatham petrel until recently; new colonies on Pitt and Chatham Islands are being established.

For a 1994 account of the birdlife of Rangatira, see Nilsson et al.

== See also ==
- List of islands of New Zealand
- List of islands
- Desert island
