= Owenga =

Rural settlement on Chatham Island, New Zealand

Coordinates: 44.027°S 176.361°W

- Chatham Island, with Owenga in the southeast

- Location of Owenga, east of New Zealand
- Country: New Zealand
- Territorial authority: Chatham Islands
- Island: Chatham Island

Population
  - Total: 51
- Time zone: Chatham Standard Time Zone

Owenga is a small settlement on Chatham Island, in New Zealand's Chatham Islands group. It is the second easternmost settlement in New Zealand, after Flower Pot Bay on Pitt Island and one of the five main settlements on Chatham Island. It is located in the southeast of the island, close to Cape Fournier.

== Toponymy ==
The official name of the settlement is Owenga, however it has had multiple different names. An 1887 map from S.P. Smith and John Robertson of the General Survey Office recorded the settlement as Ouwenga, however, a later annotated version of the map crossed out the 'w' and added Ko Wewenga as an alternate name. The 1909 version of Smith and Robertson's map by John Strauchon published the name as Ouenga with the name Ko Wewenga in brackets. A first edition map created in 1995 by the New Zealand Geographic Board depicting the settlement in 1840 showed it as Ō Wenga, however, the Board later corrected this in a revised edition in 2023, providing the names Ouenga and Owenga. Furthermore, the Board stated that Ouenga came from an ancestor's name, however, the meaning of Owenga is not known.

For these reasons, names such as Ōwenga, Ōuenga, and Kowewenga have been used alongside the official name.

The name Ouenga was used in the 2020 Moriori deed of settlement of historical claims. In 2026, Ngāti Mutunga o Wharekauri, in their deed of settlement of historical claims, requested that the name Ōwēnga be added to the New Zealand Gazetteer as an unofficial original Māori place name.

== History ==
Owenga was one of the earliest occupation areas for Moriori on the island, containing areas of archaeological evidence including coastal dune burials. The site was originally supported by a large Moriori population, however, the arrival of sealers and whalers to the Chathams brought disease, decimating the Moriori population. By 1867, there were only 30 Moriori living in the Owenga area. Many Moriori living in Owenga were landless and instead lived in small tin houses which were owned by a fishing company.

In 1868, five boats were destroyed at Owenga as a result of a tsunami.

At the turn of the 20th century, many Ngāti Mutunga o Wharekauri were employed in the fishing industry and lived at squatter shanties at Owenga. In 1910, two Wellington-based companies established fishing bases at both Owenga and Kaingaroa, with the subsequent blue cod fishing industry becoming the largest employer on Chatham Island and a key industry for the iwi.

In 1932, the population of Owenga was noted to be 150 people. In that same year, a local store, Din's store, was burnt down to the ground with an estimated loss of £4000. The store was noted as having the largest stock on the island, with the residents of Owenga being entirely dependent on it. By 1955, thirty miles of metalled, or partly metalled roads had been constructed in the Chatham Islands by the Ministry of Works, including one between Owenga and Waitangi. However, these roads were soon left in a poor state, partly as a result of the crayfish boom that occurred in the late 1960s.

In September 2008, the New Zealand Transport Agency approved funding for the reconstruction of the Owenga Wharf, which was deemed unsafe and required major rebuilding. Construction began in July 2009 and was divided into three stages; drilling and installing new piles, installing the beams, and decking and installing the fender system. The wharf was officially opened in February 2010 by Annette King, the MP for Rongotai at the time, which contains the Chatham Islands.

Today, Owenga is home to a number of fishermen and now serves as the main departure point for Pitt Island; a boat ride that takes 50 minutes.

== Services ==
The Owenga Wharf connects Owenga with Pitt Island, whilst also serving as the site for coastal shipping. The wharf was one of the first in New Zealand to have an early warning system for tsunamis.

Owenga is home to a seafood business, the Chatham Island Food Co.

There was one primary school, Owenga School, which was founded in 1910. The school underwent renovations circa 1918 by the Canterbury Education Board. In 2001, the school was noted as having a roll of 9 students before being disestablished on 11 April 2003.

St. Barnabas' Church, an Anglican church, was opened at Owenga in 1929. In 2006, the church was at threat of either being disposed of or sold.
