= Cape Fournier =

Headland on Chatham Island, New Zealand

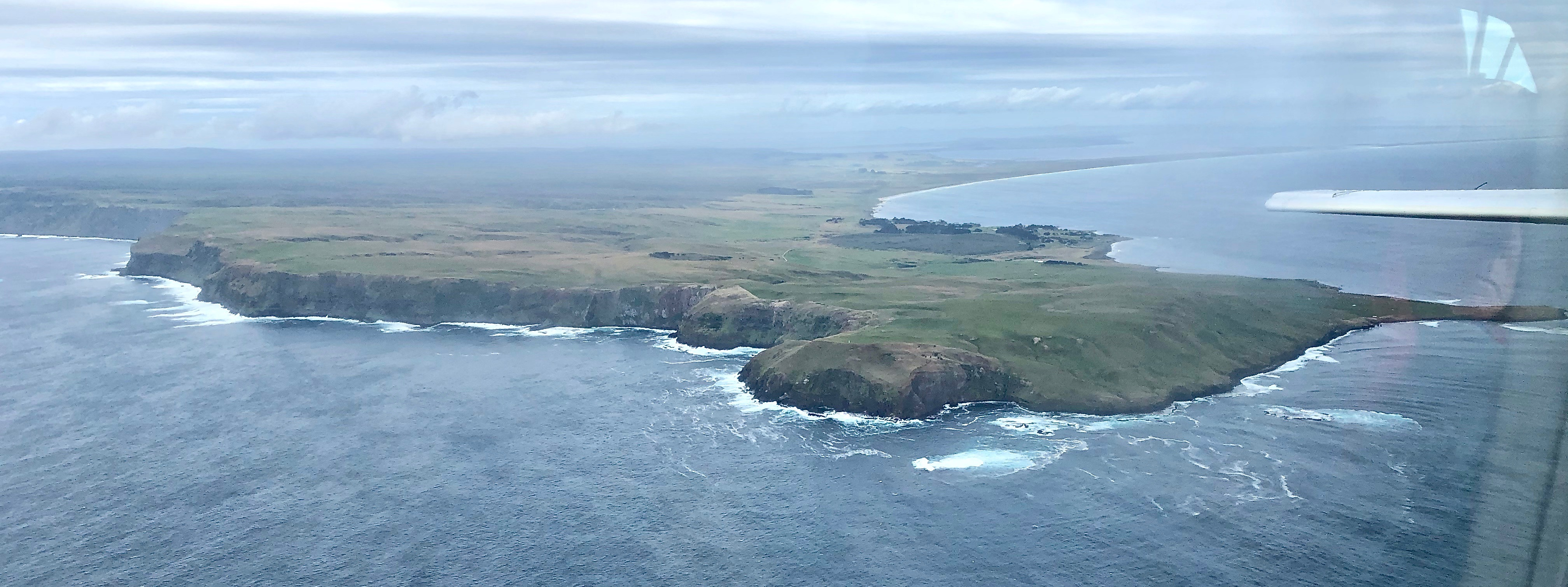
- Cape Fournier
- Interactive map of Cape Fournier
- Coordinates: 44.049°S 176.331°W
- Country: New Zealand
- Territorial authority: Chatham Islands
- Elevation: 125 m (410 ft)
- Time zone: Chatham Standard Time Zone

Cape Fournier (Moriori: Tupourangi) is a headland on Chatham Island, in New Zealand's Chatham Islands group, with cliffs rising to about 100 m (330 ft). It is the south-easternmost point in the island, to the south of Owenga, and is the closest point on the island to the second largest of the Chatham Islands, Pitt Island, which lies just over 20 km (12 mi) to the south-southeast, across Pitt Strait.

The Cape is formed of basalt of the late Cretaceous Southern Volcanics, erupted about 80 million years ago. There is a Chatham Island shag colony on the Cape. Flora includes Chatham Islands groundsel (Senecio radiolatus), giant sowthistle (Embergeria grandifolia) and keketerehe (Macrolearia chathamica).
