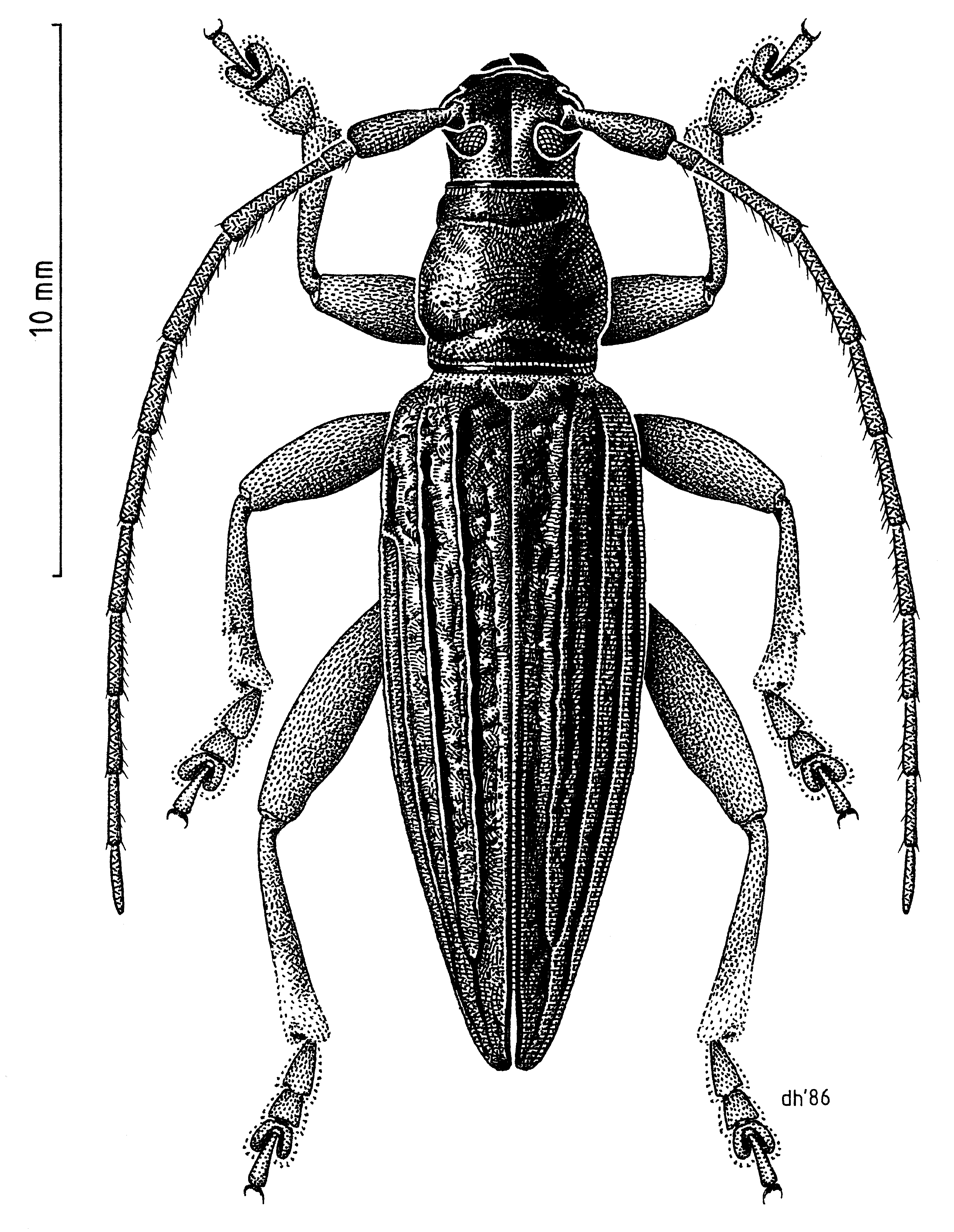
- Illustration by Des Helmore

Conservation status
- Endangered (IUCN 3.1)

- Nationally Critical (NZ TCS)

Scientific classification
- Kingdom: Animalia
- Phylum: Arthropoda
- Class: Insecta
- Order: Coleoptera
- Suborder: Polyphaga
- Infraorder: Cucujiformia
- Family: Cerambycidae
- Genus: Xylotoles
- Species: X. costatus

Binomial name
- Xylotoles costatus Pascoe, 1875

= Xylotoles costatus =

Species of beetle

Xylotoles costatus, the Pitt Island longhorn beetle, is a species of beetle in the family Cerambycidae. It is endemic to the Chatham Islands. Once thought to be extinct, it is now known to survive on South East Island/Rangatira; being therefore an example of a so-called "Lazarus taxon".

== Discovery and history of collection ==
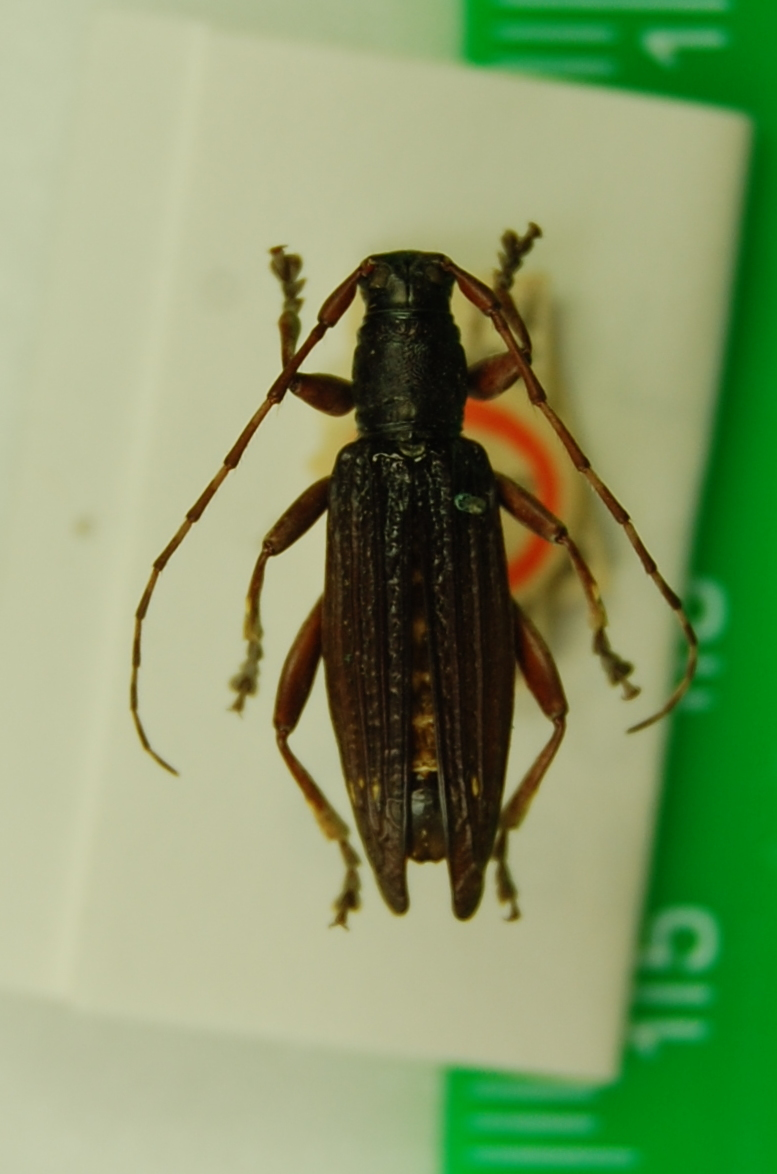
A type specimen of Xylotoles costatus in the Natural History Museum, London

Xylotoles costatus was first described and named by Francis Polkinghorne Pascoe in 1875, based on male and female specimens collected by Henry H. Travers on Pitt Island. A type specimen is held at the Natural History Museum, London. The last known collection of this beetle, prior to its rediscovery, was by Thomas Hall who extensively sampled Pitt Island for beetles between 1906 and 1908. He collected three specimens which are now held in the New Zealand Arthropod Collection.

== Description and identification ==
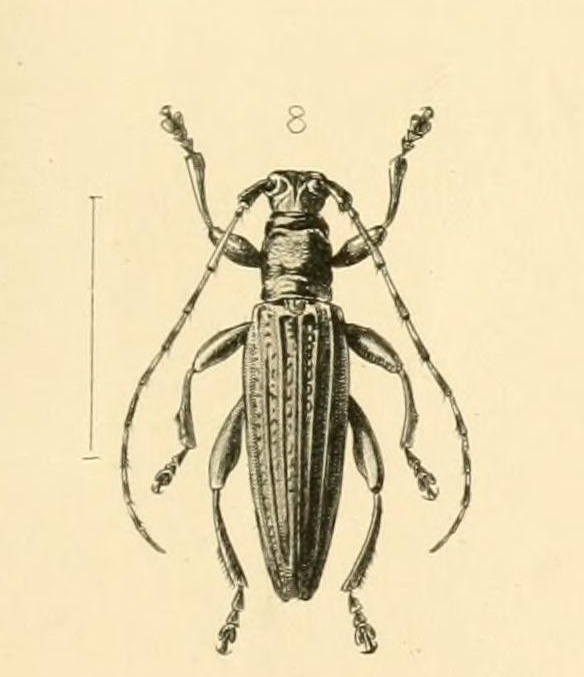
1875 illustration of Xylotoles costatus by Edward William Robinson from the article by Pascoe first describing the species

Identification of Xylotoles costatus is difficult as it is very similar in appearance to another longhorn beetle found in the Chatham Islands, Xylotoles traversii. Both species are coloured black with a green bronze sheen, however it is likely that X. costatus has more of a bronze sheen than X. traversii. Of the two species X. costatus also has the more pronounced ridges on its wing cases. Generally X. traversii is the smaller beetle of the two, but the size of the two species can overlap. However, if a longhorn beetle specimen is found in the Chatham Islands that is greater than 16 mm in length it is likely to be X. costatus.

== Habitat ==
This species of longhorn beetle is usually found on the trunks of Coprosma chathamica at night. Recently dead or dying branches also attract adult beetles.

== Conservation and threats ==
As X. costatus is flightless and will spend time moving on the ground between trees, it is vulnerable to rodent predation. Knowing its exact habitat requirements as an adult and at the larval stage is thought to be a conservation priority. This species has not been seen at its type locality of Pitt Island since 1907 despite extensive surveys for it since 1990. After 1910, it was not seen again until 1987; the latter and all subsequent specimens have been collected on Rangatira, an island that lies off the south-east coast of Pitt Island. This species is the only longhorn beetle that is legally protected under schedule 7 of the 1953 Wildlife Act, making it an offense to kill, possess, buy or sell a specimen.
