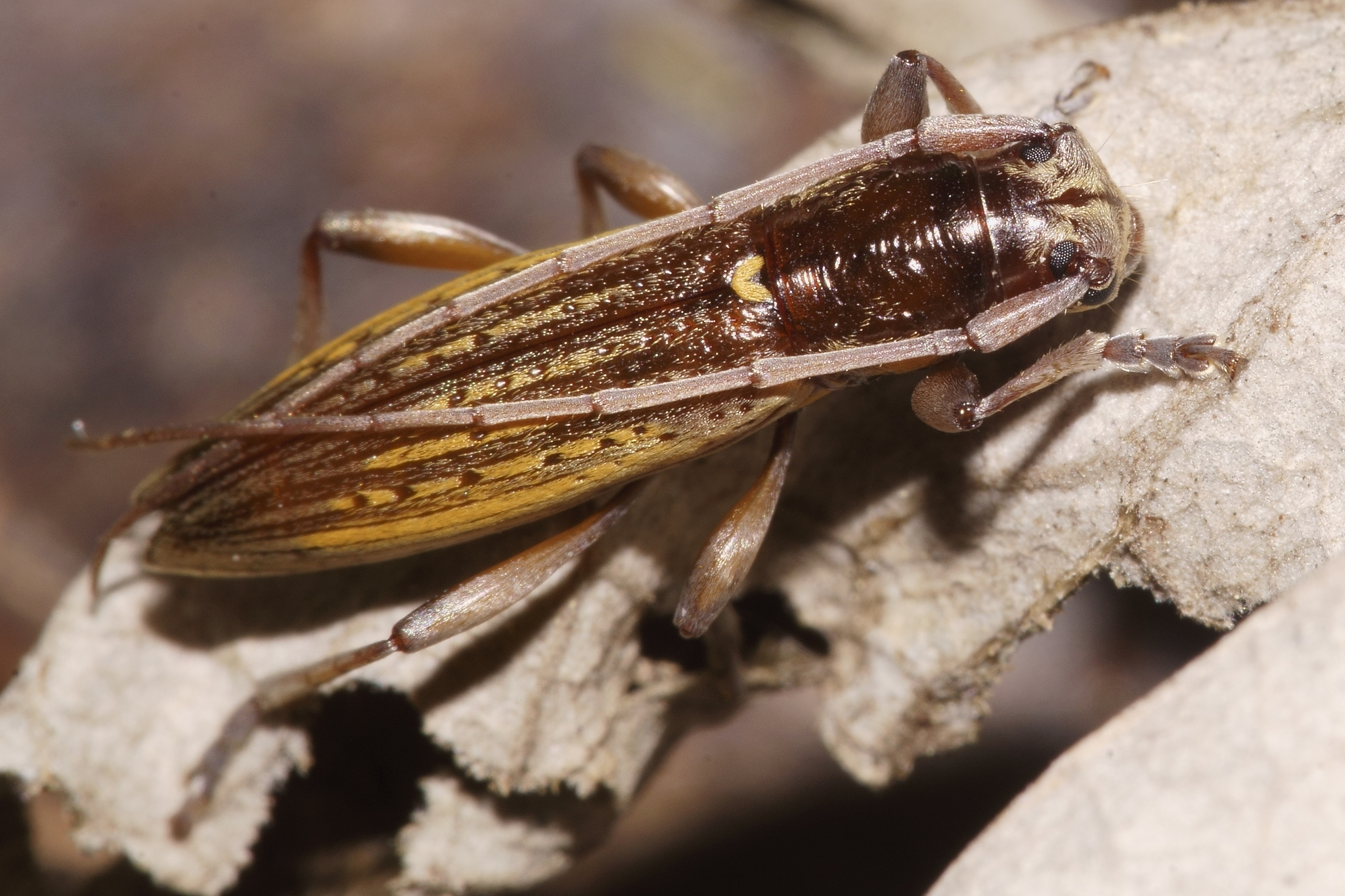
- Xylotoles lynceus, New Zealand

Scientific classification
- Domain: Eukaryota
- Kingdom: Animalia
- Phylum: Arthropoda
- Class: Insecta
- Order: Coleoptera
- Suborder: Polyphaga
- Infraorder: Cucujiformia
- Family: Cerambycidae
- Subfamily: Lamiinae
- Tribe: Dorcadiini
- Genus: Xylotoles; Newman, 1840

Synonyms
- Trichoxylotoles Breuning, 1950; Xyloteles White, 1843

= Xylotoles =

Genus of beetles

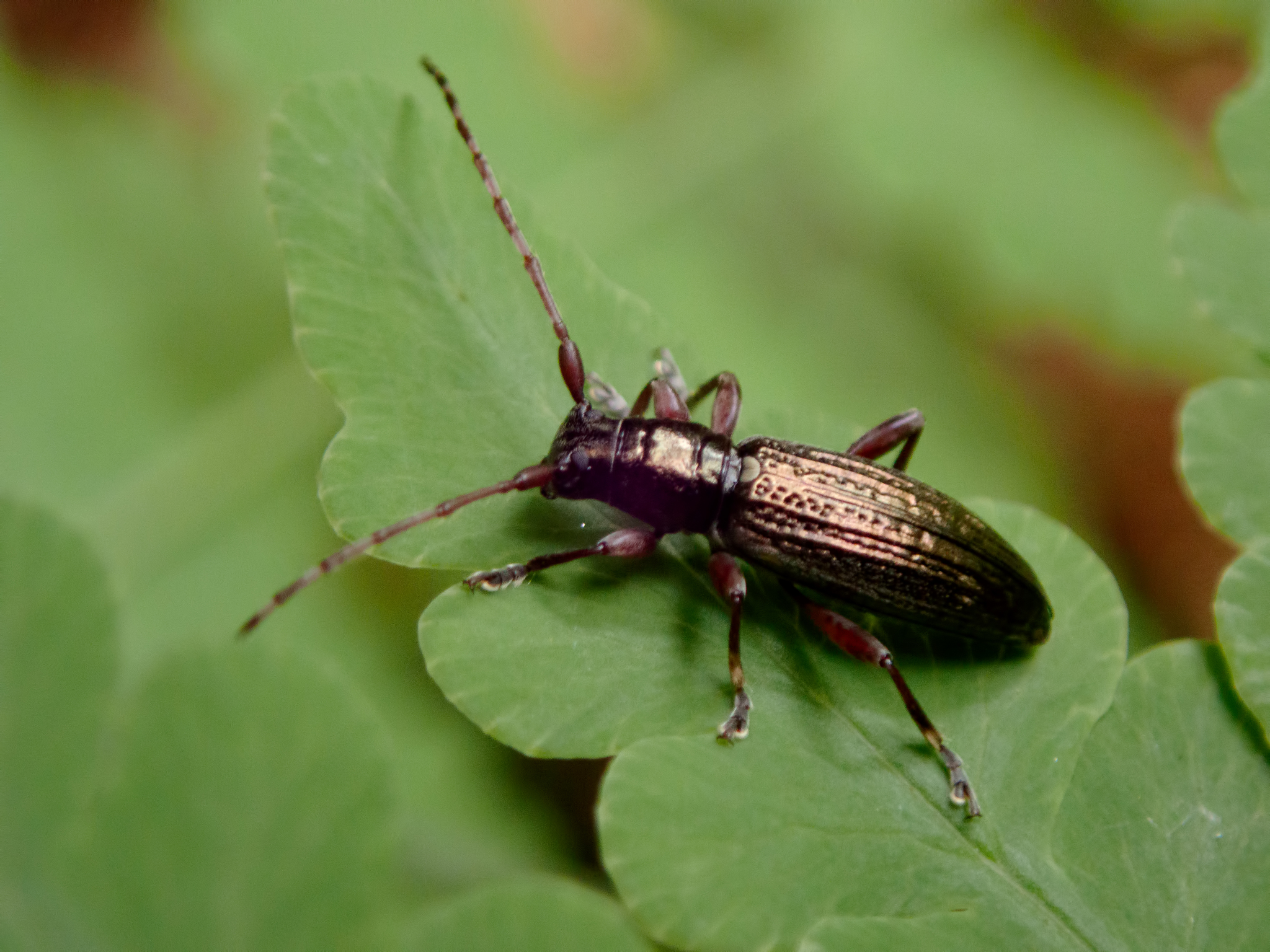
Xylotoles traversii, New Zealand

Xylotoles is a genus of flat-faced longhorns in the beetle family Cerambycidae. There are more than 15 described species in Xylotoles found mainly in New Zealand, Australia, and surrounding islands.

The IUCN conservation status of Xylotoles costatus, the Pitt Island longhorn beetle, is "EN", endangered. Once thought to be extinct, the species faces a high risk of extinction in the near future.

== Species ==
These 17 species belong to the genus Xylotoles:

- Xylotoles aegrotus Bates, 1874
- Xylotoles apicalis Broun, 1923
- Xylotoles costatus Pascoe, 1875 (Pitt Island longhorn beetle)
- Xylotoles costipennis (Breuning, 1982)
- Xylotoles griseus (Fabricius, 1775)
- Xylotoles inornatus Broun, 1880
- Xylotoles laetus White, 1846
- Xylotoles lynceus (Fabricius, 1775)
- Xylotoles nudus Bates, 1874
- Xylotoles pattesoni Olliff, 1888
- Xylotoles rugicollis Bates, 1874
- Xylotoles sandageri Broun, 1886
- Xylotoles scissicauda Bates, 1874
- Xylotoles segrex Olliff, 1889
- Xylotoles selwini Olliff, 1888
- Xylotoles traversii Pascoe, 1876
- Xylotoles wollastoni (White, 1856)
