= Rabbit Island (Chatham Islands) =

Island of the Chatham Islands, New Zealand

Coordinates: 44°14′24″S 176°16′54″W

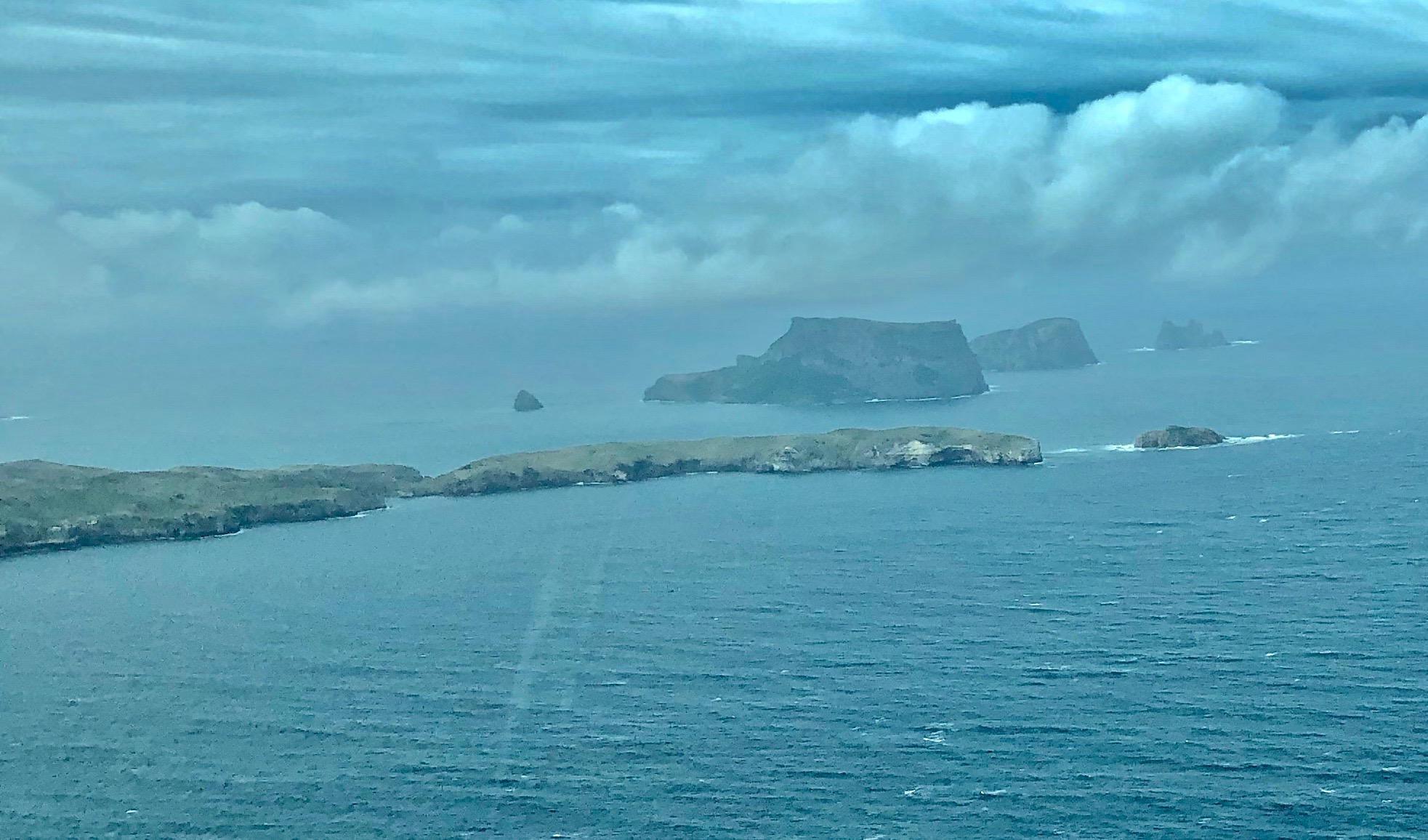
Tarawhenua Pt and Rabbit Island in centre. Sugar Loaf and Mangere Islands behind

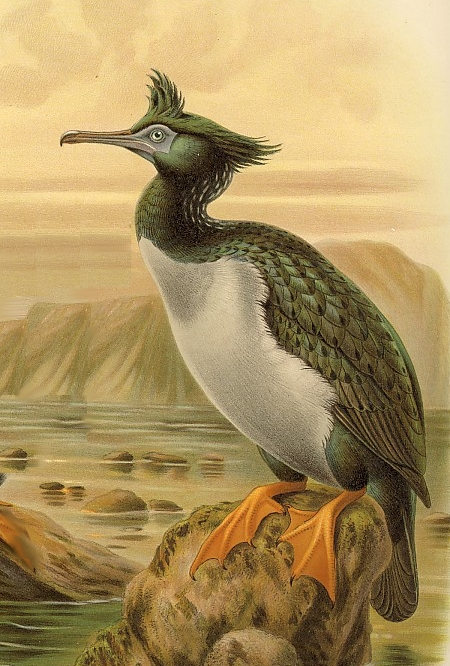
Pitt shag, illustrated by Keulemans

Rabbit Island is a rocky islet lying off Tarawhenua Point on the north-west coast of Pitt Island in the Chatham Islands group of New Zealand. About 300 m long by 200 m across, its highest point is 44 m above sea level. It has been identified as an Important Bird Area by BirdLife International because it supports breeding colonies of the critically endangered Chatham and endangered Pitt shags.

== See also ==
- Desert island
- List of islands
