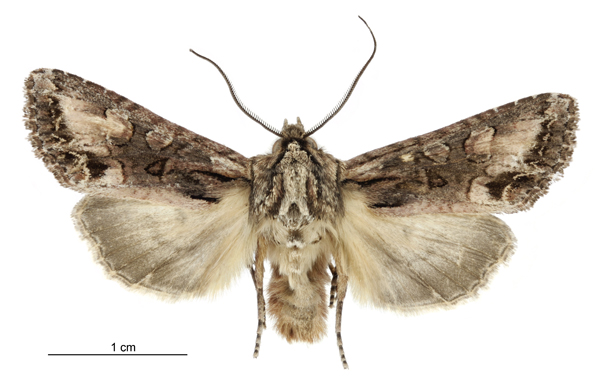
- Male

Scientific classification
- Kingdom: Animalia
- Phylum: Arthropoda
- Clade: Pancrustacea
- Class: Insecta
- Order: Lepidoptera
- Superfamily: Noctuoidea
- Family: Noctuidae
- Genus: Ichneutica
- Species: I. bromias

Binomial name
- Ichneutica bromias (Meyrick, 1902)

Synonyms
- Melanchra bromias Meyrick, 1902; Graphania bromias (Meyrick, 1902)

= Ichneutica bromias =

Species of moth

Ichneutica bromias is a moth of the family Noctuidae. This species is endemic to the Chatham Islands of New Zealand, where it is found on the Chatham, Pitt and Rangatira Islands. This species is similar in appearance to Ichneutica mutans, but is darker and duller in its overall appearance. However, as I. mutans is not present in the Chathams, this similarity is unlikely to cause confusion. The adults of the species are on the wing from November to March. The life history and the larval host species are unknown.

== Taxonomy ==
I. bromias was first described by Edward Meyrick in 1902 using four specimens collected from Chatham Island. The lectotype specimen is held at the Natural History Museum, London.

== Description ==
Meyrick described this species as follows:

♂ ♀. 31-36 mm. Head and thorax grey, sometimes whitish-mixed, variably tinged with brownish or reddish, and indistinctly marked irregularly with blackish streaks. Antennae in ♂ shortly bipectinated to 3/5. Abdomen light grey, sometimes ochreous-tinged. Forewings moderately dilated, costa almost straight, apex obtuse, termen crenulate, obliquely rounded; grey, puitially whitish-sprinkled, variably and irregularly tinged with purple-brownish, median band and terminal area darker; a short black median longitudinal streak from base; a short similar parallel streak from dorsum near base, sometimes obsolete; first and second lines slender, blackish, waved, nearly obsolete on upper half, fairly distinct and rather nearly approximated on lower half; spots outlined with black, more or less rosy-brownish, especially reniform, orbicular and reniform sometimes whitish-edged, orbicular semi-oval, incomplete above, claviform subtriangular; subterminal line white, sometimes interrupted or partially obsolete, with one prominent dentation below middle (on vein 3), near dorsum more conspicuous and preceded by a triangular dark fuscous spot, elsewhere edged with smaller dark fuscous spots : cilia fuscous, mixed with dark fuscous, and indistinctly barred with whitish. Hindwings light fuscous, darker terminally; cilia whitish, with cloudy dark fuscous line.

The male of I. bromias has a wingspan of between 34 and 42 mm, and the female of the species has a wingspan of between 32 and 43 mm. This species is similar in appearance to I. mutans, but is darker and duller in appearance. As I. mutans has not been recorded in the Chatham Islands, confusion between these two species is unlikely.

== Distribution ==
This species is endemic to the Chatham Islands of New Zealand. I. bromias is found on the Chatham, Pitt and Rangatira Islands.

== Behaviour ==
Adult female I. bromias release pheromones to attract males at the lower temperature of 15 degrees Celsius compared to other species in the Ichneutica genus. The adult moths are on the wing from November to March.

== Life history and host species ==
The life history of this species is unknown, as are the host species of the larvae. Similar to other species in the Ichneutica genus, it is presumed that the larvae of this species exist on a variety of ground cover or low growing herbaceous plants.
