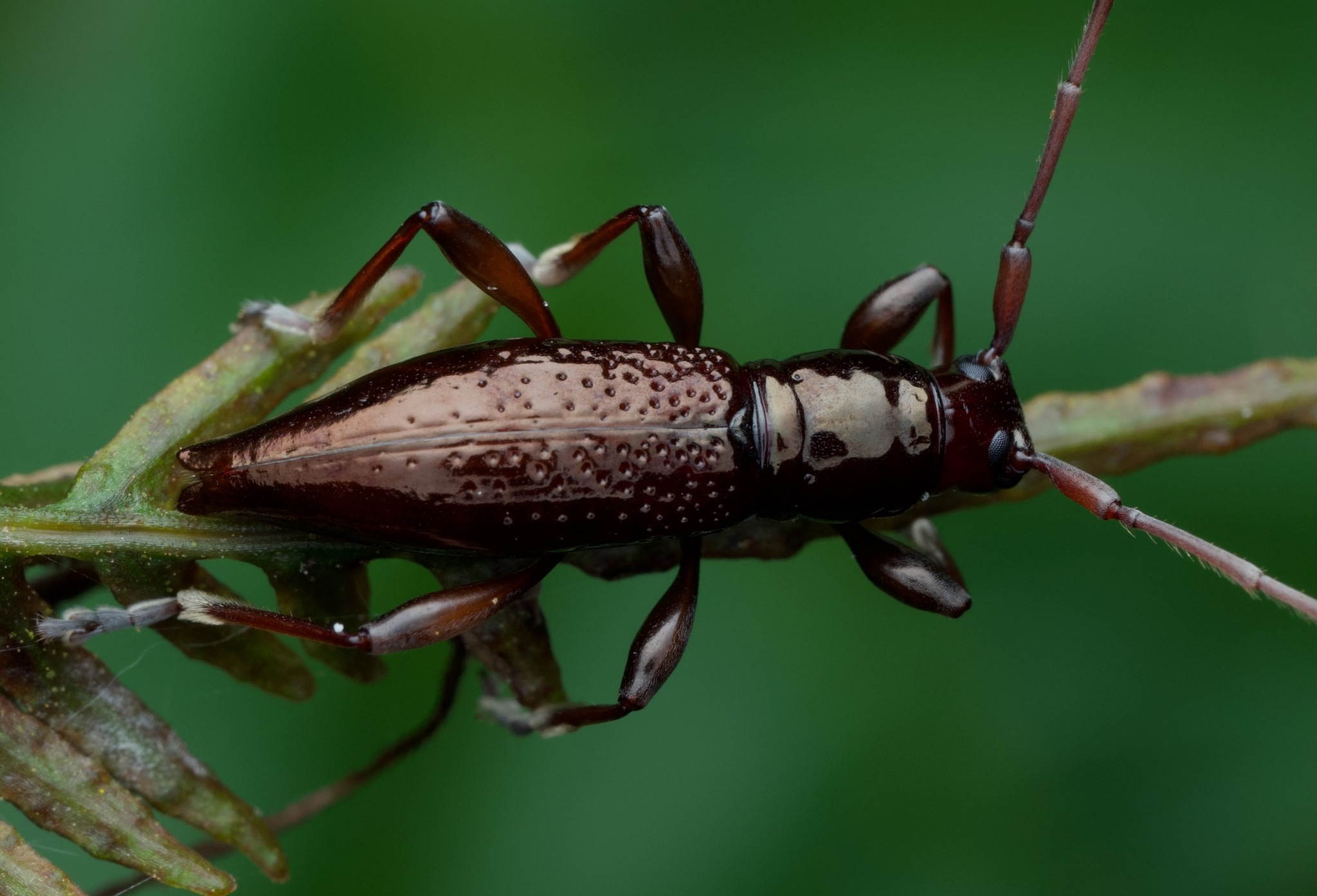

Scientific classification
- Kingdom: Animalia
- Phylum: Arthropoda
- Class: Insecta
- Order: Coleoptera
- Suborder: Polyphaga
- Infraorder: Cucujiformia
- Family: Cerambycidae
- Genus: Xylotoles
- Species: X. nudus

Binomial name
- Xylotoles nudus Bates, 1874

= Xylotoles nudus =

Species of beetle

Xylotoles nudus is a species of beetle in the family Cerambycidae. It was described by Henry Walter Bates in 1874. It is endemic to New Zealand. It contains the varietas/subspecies Xylotoles nudus var. prolongatus.

Xylotoles nudus measure 9–11.5 mm (0.35–0.45 in).
