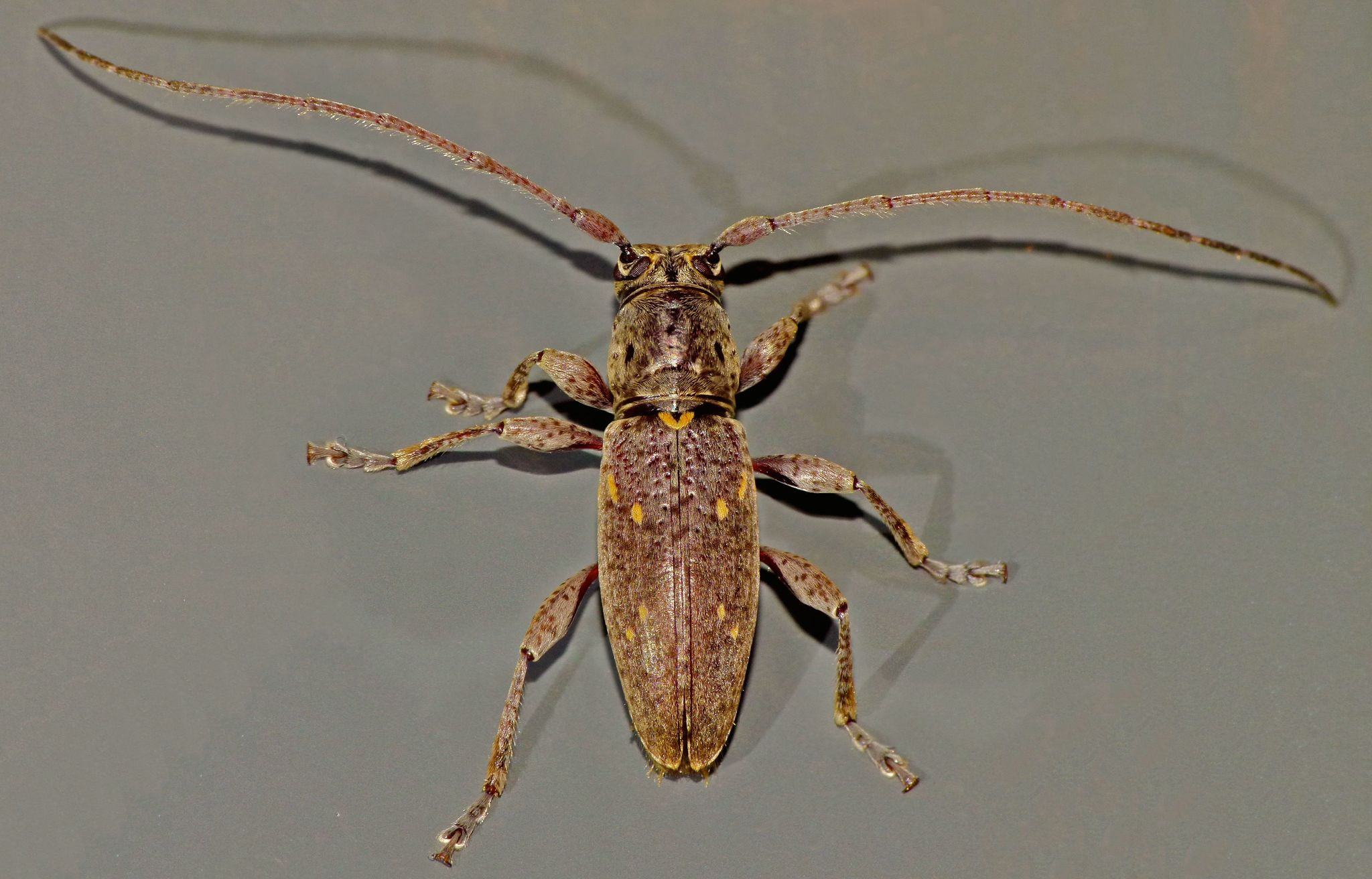

Scientific classification
- Kingdom: Animalia
- Phylum: Arthropoda
- Class: Insecta
- Order: Coleoptera
- Suborder: Polyphaga
- Infraorder: Cucujiformia
- Family: Cerambycidae
- Genus: Xylotoles
- Species: X. griseus

Binomial name
- Xylotoles griseus (Fabricius, 1775)

Synonyms
- Hexathrica heteromorpha (Boisduval); Lamia heteromorpha Boisduval, 1835; Saperda grisea Fabricius, 1775; Xyloteles westwoodii Guérin-Méneville, 1847; Xylotoles lentus Newmann, 1840; Xylotoles subpinguis White, 1846

= Xylotoles griseus =

Species of beetle

Xylotoles griseus, the fig longhorn, is a species of beetle in the family Cerambycidae. It was described by Johan Christian Fabricius in 1775, originally under the genus Saperda. It is known from New Zealand where it feeds on elm trees. It is widespread and common in New Zealand, breeding on many species of trees. It was found in the UK for the first time when a number of adults were taken from a recently felled fig tree at Westward Ho!, Devon in 2014. It feeds mainly on dead wood.

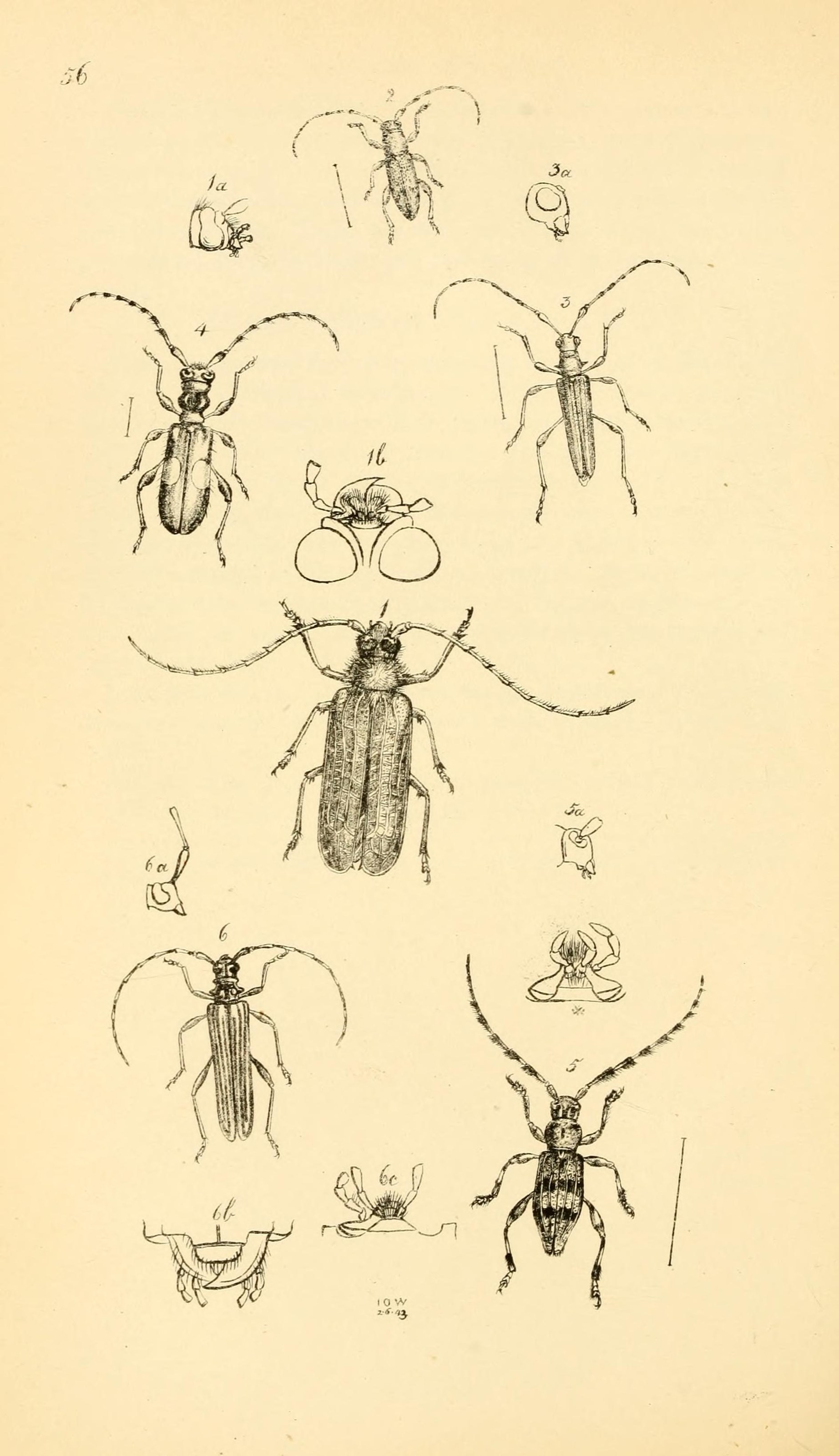
Figure 2 is Xylotoles griseus

== Varieties ==
- Xylotoles griseus var. maculosus Broun, 1886
- Xylotoles griseus var. submicans Broun, 1921
