= Xylotoles selwini =

Scientific classification
- Domain: Eukaryota
- Kingdom: Animalia
- Phylum: Arthropoda
- Class: Insecta
- Order: Coleoptera
- Suborder: Polyphaga
- Infraorder: Cucujiformia
- Family: Cerambycidae
- Genus: Xylotoles
- Species: X. selwini

Binomial name
- Xylotoles selwini Olliff, 1888

Synonyms
- Xylotoles selwyni Olliff, 1888; Xyloteles selwyni (Oliff) Smithers, 1998 (misspelling)

Species of beetle

Xylotoles selwini is a species of beetle in the family Cerambycidae that was described by Olliff in 1888. It occurs in Australia.
