= Psilocnaeia parvula =

Scientific classification
- Kingdom: Animalia
- Phylum: Arthropoda
- Class: Insecta
- Order: Coleoptera
- Suborder: Polyphaga
- Infraorder: Cucujiformia
- Family: Cerambycidae
- Subfamily: Lamiinae
- Tribe: Acanthocinini
- Genus: Psilocnaeia
- Species: P. parvula

Binomial name
- Psilocnaeia parvula (White, 1846)

Synonyms
- Xylotoles parvulus White, 1846; Xylotoles apicicauda Breuning, 1943

Species of beetle

Psilocnaeia parvula is a species of longhorned beetle in the family Cerambycidae. It is endemic to New Zealand.
