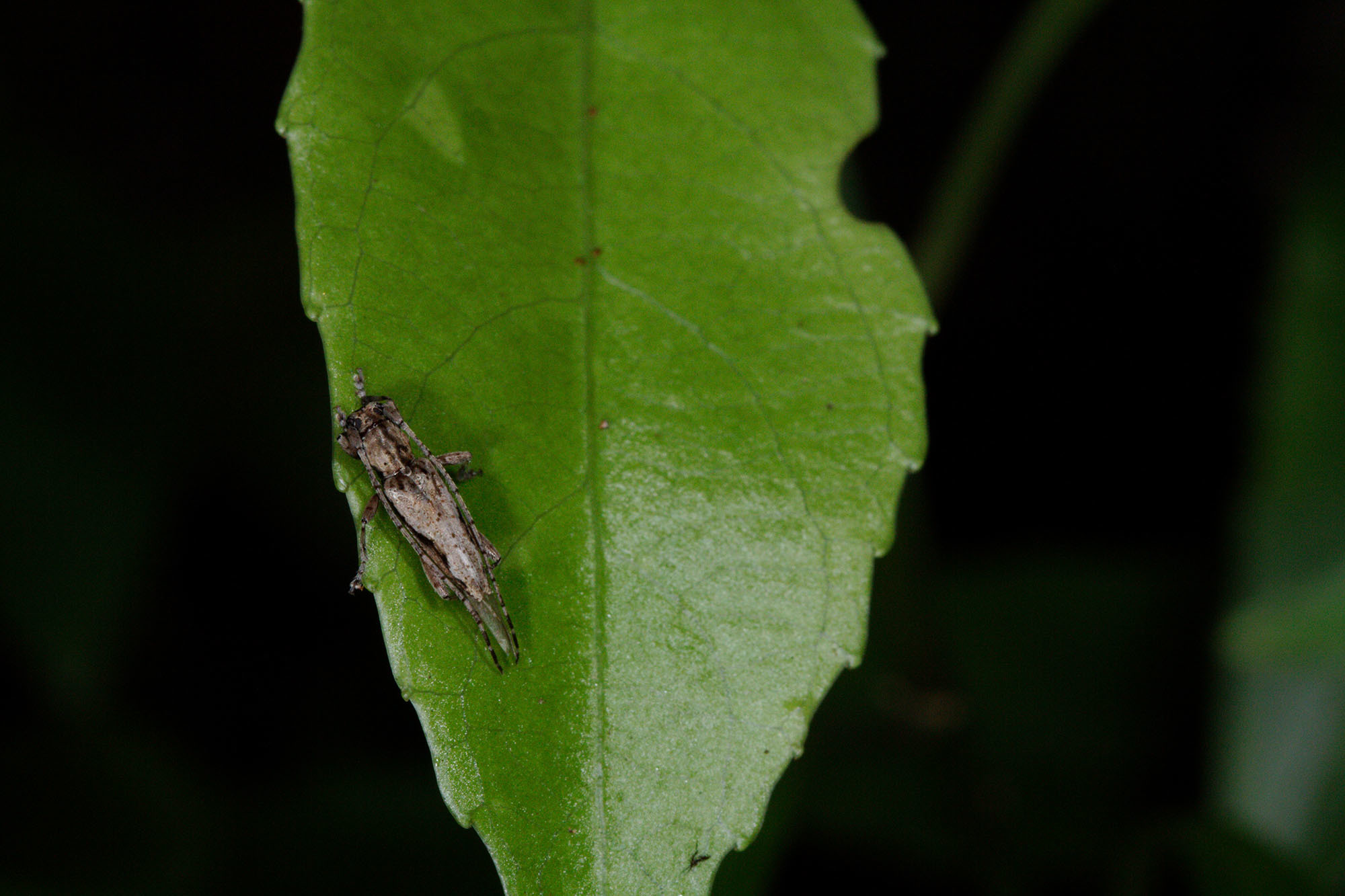
- Psilocnaeia brouni, New Zealand

Scientific classification
- Domain: Eukaryota
- Kingdom: Animalia
- Phylum: Arthropoda
- Class: Insecta
- Order: Coleoptera
- Suborder: Polyphaga
- Infraorder: Cucujiformia
- Family: Cerambycidae
- Subfamily: Lamiinae
- Tribe: Acanthocinini
- Genus: Psilocnaeia; Bates, 1874

= Psilocnaeia =

Genus of beetles

Psilocnaeia is a genus of flat-faced longhorns in the beetle family Cerambycidae. There are about seven described species in Psilocnaeia, found in New Zealand.

== Species ==
These seven species belong to the genus Psilocnaeia:

- Psilocnaeia aegrota (Bates, 1874)
- Psilocnaeia asteliae Kuschel, 1990
- Psilocnaeia brouni Bates, 1876
- Psilocnaeia bullata (Bates, 1876)
- Psilocnaeia linearis Bates, 1874
- Psilocnaeia nana (Bates, 1874)
- Psilocnaeia parvula (White, 1846)
