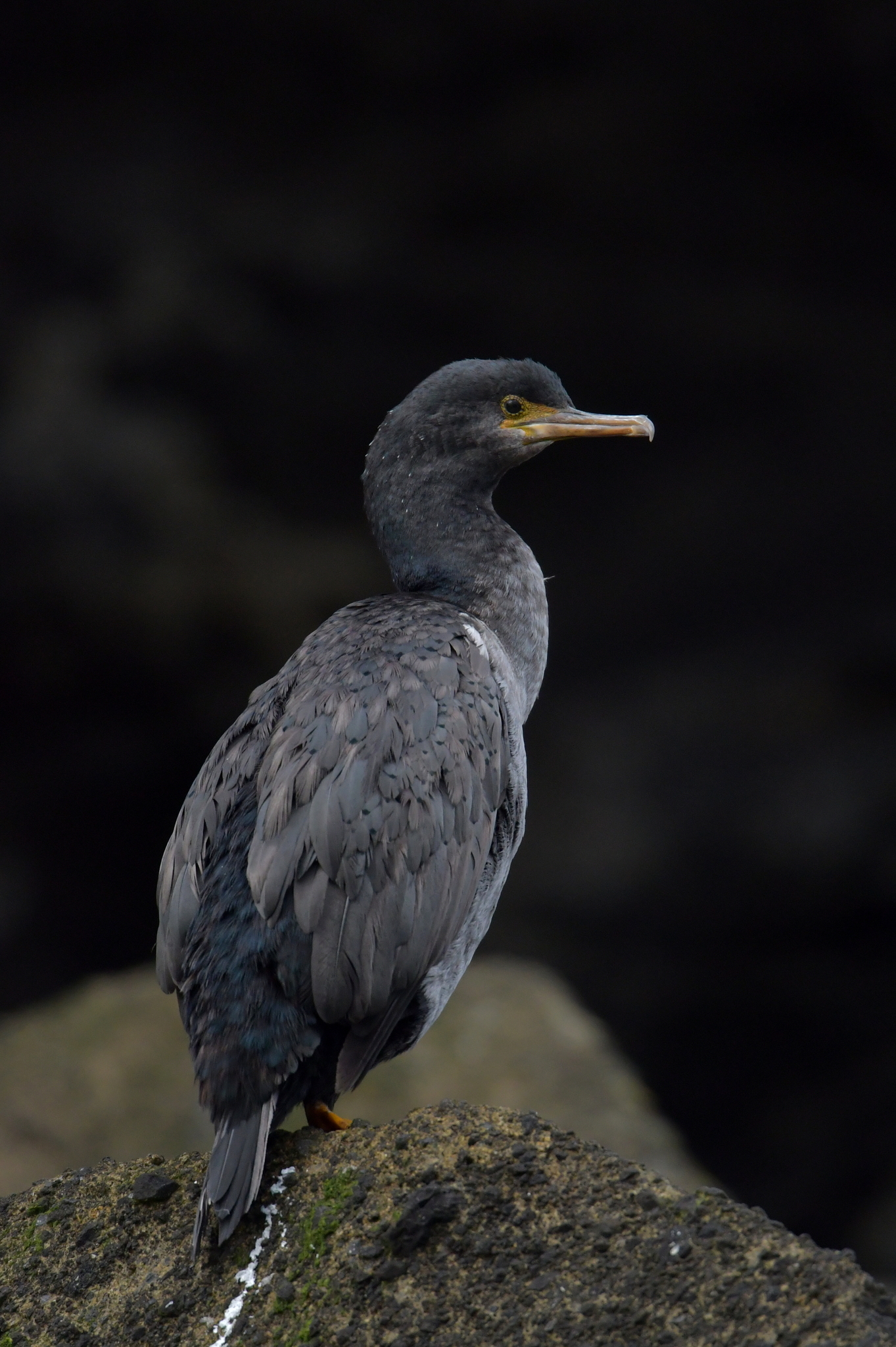
- A Pitt shag at Pitt Island

Conservation status
- Endangered (IUCN 3.1)

Scientific classification
- Kingdom: Animalia
- Phylum: Chordata
- Class: Aves
- Order: Suliformes
- Family: Phalacrocoracidae
- Genus: Phalacrocorax
- Species: P. featherstoni

Binomial name
- Phalacrocorax featherstoni Buller, 1873
- Approximate distribution Range (Chatham Islands, New Zealand, Oceania)

Synonyms
- Stictocarbo featherstoni

= Pitt shag =

Species of bird

The Pitt shag (Phalacrocorax featherstoni), also known as the Pitt Island shag or Featherstone's shag, is a species of bird in the family Phalacrocoracidae. It is endemic to Pitt Island where its natural habitats are open seas and rocky shores. The bird with the color of a dark body, gray chest, yellow eyes and feet can be found in small groups in their breeding habitat or alone within 18 km from their territory searching for food. The species was close to extinction in 1905 but actions of conservation have been done ever since. The Pitt shag is threatened by habitat loss due to predation and climate change causing a decline from 1997 to 2012, but there is a recovery plan by the Department of Conservation.

== Description ==
Members of the shag family belong to three groups, based on the color of their feet: black, yellow or pink. Outside New Zealand, the black-footed shags are better known as cormorants. The Pitt shag belongs to the yellow footed group. They are about 63 cm in length and weigh 650–1300 g, with a slim build. The Pitt shag has a yellow colored detail around the eyes, light gray at the neck and chest, and the rest of the head, back, wings and tail with shades of black and navy.

== Taxonomy ==
From the Spotted shag (Phalacrocorax punctatus), the Pitt shag became a subspecies. This representative of the shags in the Chatham Group was discovered by H.H. Travers in 1871. Buller dedicated the species to Dr Featherston, superintendent of the Province of Wellington at that time. The Spotted shag and the Pitt shag have been determined as a part of the Phalacrocorax genus considering a DNA study.

== Behavior ==
Vocalization

When apart from the group the Pitt shag is quiet, but during mating season males make noises of grunting, gargling and ticking while females remain silent.

Diet

Shags find food on their own, traveling up to 18 km from their territory to feed on mostly small fish and when possible snails, worms and crustaceans found flying over waters and shores.

Breeding

From August to December, 2 to 3 year old Pitt shags gather in small crowds on the rocky shores and cliffs of the coast, protecting themselves against predators and weather. With up to 40 pairs of birds, nests are created out of small branches, plants and seaweed, and are eventually found with about 2 to 4 pale bluish-white colored eggs. Parents take turns incubating the eggs for about 30 days, once hatched a single parent will stay with the chicks for two weeks, then both parents will search and feed their chicks until they fledge at around 6 to 8 weeks.

== Habitat and distribution ==
The Pitt shag is native to the Chatham Islands in New Zealand, islands such as the Chatham, Pitt, Rangatira, Mangere, Little Mangere, Western Reef, Pyramid, Sisters, Murumuru, Castle, Rabbit, Forty Fours and Star Keys. On an island the bird is located along the coast, on rocky islets and over nearby waters where breeding and foraging takes place such as the Te Whanga Lagoon.

== Status and conservation ==
Apparently never a common species, it was reported as nearly extinct in 1905. The Department of Conservation does have a recovery plan for this bird.

Threat

The Pitt shag is assessed as endangered due to its loss of breeding habitat and rapidly declining, small population. Studies show a record of 729 pairs found from 1997 to 1998, 547 pairs from 2003 to 2004, and 434 pairs from 2011 to 2012. With nests planted along coastal cliffs predators are not much of a concern, although Feral Cats, Black Rats, Brown Rats, Common Brushtail Possum and Weka are known to be possible threats. The threat of human activity is more evident as it causes climate change, leading to changes in their environment and resources. These activities include introduction of predators, bycatch in the fishing industry, bird hunting, and crayfish pots.

Recovery plan

Conservation actions done specifically for the Pitt shag are not very apparent, although other works on the Chatham Islands have been done such as withdrawing sheep and cattle from the South East and Mangere Islands in 1961 and 1968, and fencing coastal habitats to avoid possible interference. Actions that are being considered are measuring the whole adult population with intervals of 10 years starting from the year a plan is created, and in each year study the pattern of two communities. Other plans include analyzing the effect of rock lobster fishing, additional fencing, continuous studying of the breeding and foraging of the bird, and withdrawing feral cats, Wekas, sheep, cattle and pigs concerning Pitt and Chatham Islands.
