= Xylotoles inornatus =

Scientific classification
- Kingdom: Animalia
- Phylum: Arthropoda
- Class: Insecta
- Order: Coleoptera
- Suborder: Polyphaga
- Infraorder: Cucujiformia
- Family: Cerambycidae
- Genus: Xylotoles
- Species: X. inornatus

Binomial name
- Xylotoles inornatus Broun, 1880

Species of beetle

Xylotoles inornatus is a species of beetle in the family Cerambycidae. It was described by Broun in 1880. It is known from New Zealand.
