= Xylotoles segrex =

Scientific classification
- Domain: Eukaryota
- Kingdom: Animalia
- Phylum: Arthropoda
- Class: Insecta
- Order: Coleoptera
- Suborder: Polyphaga
- Infraorder: Cucujiformia
- Family: Cerambycidae
- Genus: Xylotoles
- Species: X. segrex

Binomial name
- Xylotoles segrex Olliff, 1889

Species of beetle

Xylotoles segrex is a species of beetle in the family Cerambycidae. It was described by Arthur Sidney Olliff in 1889. It is known from Australia, from Lord Howe Island.
