= Xylotoles lynceus =

Scientific classification
- Domain: Eukaryota
- Kingdom: Animalia
- Phylum: Arthropoda
- Class: Insecta
- Order: Coleoptera
- Suborder: Polyphaga
- Infraorder: Cucujiformia
- Family: Cerambycidae
- Genus: Xylotoles
- Species: X. lynceus

Binomial name
- Xylotoles lynceus (Fabricius, 1775)

Synonyms
- Saperda lynceus Fabricius, 1775; Xylotoles angustulus Broun, 1886

Species of beetle

Xylotoles lynceus is a species of beetle in the family Cerambycidae. It was described by Johan Christian Fabricius in 1775, originally under the genus Saperda. It is known from New Zealand.
