= Psilocnaeia nana =

Scientific classification
- Kingdom: Animalia
- Phylum: Arthropoda
- Class: Insecta
- Order: Coleoptera
- Suborder: Polyphaga
- Infraorder: Cucujiformia
- Family: Cerambycidae
- Genus: Psilocnaeia
- Species: P. nana

Binomial name
- Psilocnaeia nana (Bates, 1874)

Synonyms
- Xylotoles nanus Bates, 1874

Species of beetle

Psilocnaeia nana is a species of longhorned beetle in the family Cerambycidae. It is endemic to New Zealand.
