= Flowerpot Bay =

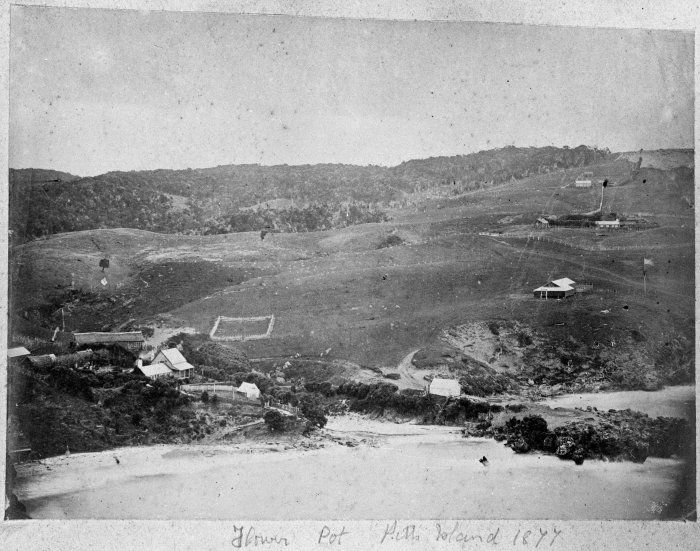
- Flowerpot Bay in 1877

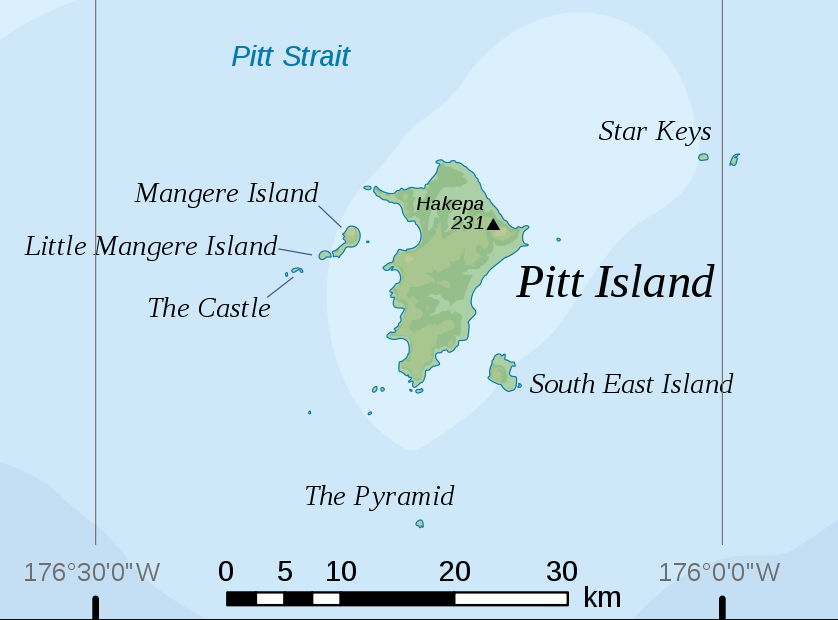
- Pitt Island, Flowerpot Bay is located on the north coast

- Location of Flowerpot Bay, east of New Zealand
- Coordinates: 44°14′24″S 176°16′54″W
- Country: New Zealand
- Territorial authority: Chatham Islands
- Island: Pitt Island
- Time zone: Chatham Standard Time Zone

Flowerpot Bay, also known as Flower Pot Bay, Flower Pot, or Onoua, is a small bay, some 250m across, on the north coast of Pitt Island in the Chatham Islands group of New Zealand. With a jetty at its western end, it is the main point of access by sea to the island.

In the vicinity is the island's primary school, its church and its only tourist accommodation, the Flowerpot Bay Lodge. The site has been identified as an Important Bird Area by BirdLife International because it supports a breeding colony of endangered Pitt shags, with 75 nests recorded in 1998.
