= Xylotoles laetus =

Scientific classification
- Domain: Eukaryota
- Kingdom: Animalia
- Phylum: Arthropoda
- Class: Insecta
- Order: Coleoptera
- Suborder: Polyphaga
- Infraorder: Cucujiformia
- Family: Cerambycidae
- Genus: Xylotoles
- Species: X. laetus

Binomial name
- Xylotoles laetus White, 1846

Species of beetle

Xylotoles laetus is a species of beetle in the family Cerambycidae. It was described by White in 1846. It is known from New Zealand.
