= Xylotoles scissicauda =

Scientific classification
- Domain: Eukaryota
- Kingdom: Animalia
- Phylum: Arthropoda
- Class: Insecta
- Order: Coleoptera
- Suborder: Polyphaga
- Infraorder: Cucujiformia
- Family: Cerambycidae
- Genus: Xylotoles
- Species: X. scissicauda

Binomial name
- Xylotoles scissicauda Bates, 1874

Synonyms
- Xylotoles phormiobius Broun, 1893

Species of beetle

Xylotoles scissicauda is a species of beetle in the family Cerambycidae. It was described by Bates in 1874. It is known from New Zealand.
