= Xylotoles pattesoni =

Scientific classification
- Domain: Eukaryota
- Kingdom: Animalia
- Phylum: Arthropoda
- Class: Insecta
- Order: Coleoptera
- Suborder: Polyphaga
- Infraorder: Cucujiformia
- Family: Cerambycidae
- Genus: Xylotoles
- Species: X. pattesoni

Binomial name
- Xylotoles pattesoni Olliff, 1888

Species of beetle

Xylotoles pattesoni is a species of beetle in the family Cerambycidae. It was described by Olliff in 1888. It is known from Australia and New Zealand.
