= Xylotoles apicalis =

Scientific classification
- Kingdom: Animalia
- Phylum: Arthropoda
- Class: Insecta
- Order: Coleoptera
- Suborder: Polyphaga
- Infraorder: Cucujiformia
- Family: Cerambycidae
- Genus: Xylotoles
- Species: X. apicalis

Binomial name
- Xylotoles apicalis Broun, 1923

Synonyms
- Xylotoles apicalis Broun, 1923

Species of beetle

Xylotoles apicalis is a species of longhorned beetle in the family Cerambycidae, found in New Zealand.
