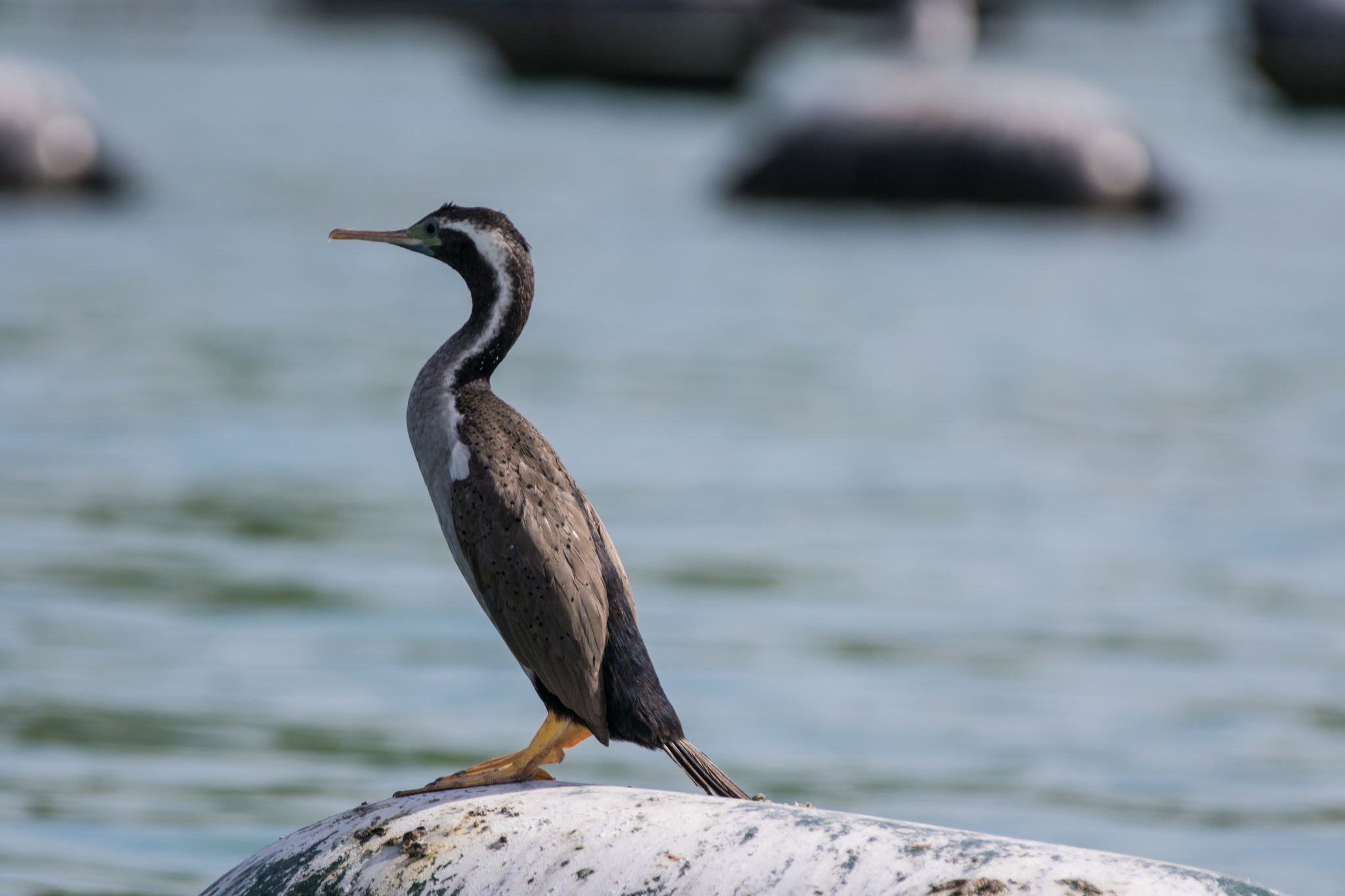

Conservation status
- Least Concern (IUCN 3.1)

Scientific classification
- Kingdom: Animalia
- Phylum: Chordata
- Class: Aves
- Order: Suliformes
- Family: Phalacrocoracidae
- Genus: Phalacrocorax
- Species: P. punctatus

Binomial name
- Phalacrocorax punctatus (Sparrman, 1786)

Synonyms
- Stictocarbo punctatus

= Spotted shag =

Species of bird

The spotted shag or pārekareka (Phalacrocorax punctatus) is a species of cormorant endemic to New Zealand. Though originally classified as Phalacrocorax punctatus, it is sufficiently different in appearance from typical members of that genus that for a time it was placed in a separate genus, Stictocarbo, along with a similar species, the Pitt shag. Subsequent genetic studies show that the spotted shag's lineage is nested within the typical shags.

== Taxonomy ==
The spotted shag was initially called the 'crested shag' by Johann Forster. He shot the bird while hunting with the English Naval Explorer James Cook during the second voyage of James Cook. Swedish naturalist Anders Sparrman was Forster's assistant, he described the spotted shag in 1786 as Pelicanus punctatus.

French ornithologist Charles Lucien Bonaparte erected the separate genus Stictocarbo for it in 1855. It was later returned to its original genus.

In 1930, the Stewart Island population was described as a separate species, the blue shag (Stictocarbo steadi), distinguished by its narrow rather than broad white stripe on its head and neck.

A 2014 molecular study by Kennedy and Spencer found that the spotted shag belongs to a clade of Old World cormorants. Its closest relative is the Pitt shag (P. featherstoni), and their common ancestor split from a lineage giving rise to the black-faced, pied and little black cormorants of Australia.

== Description ==
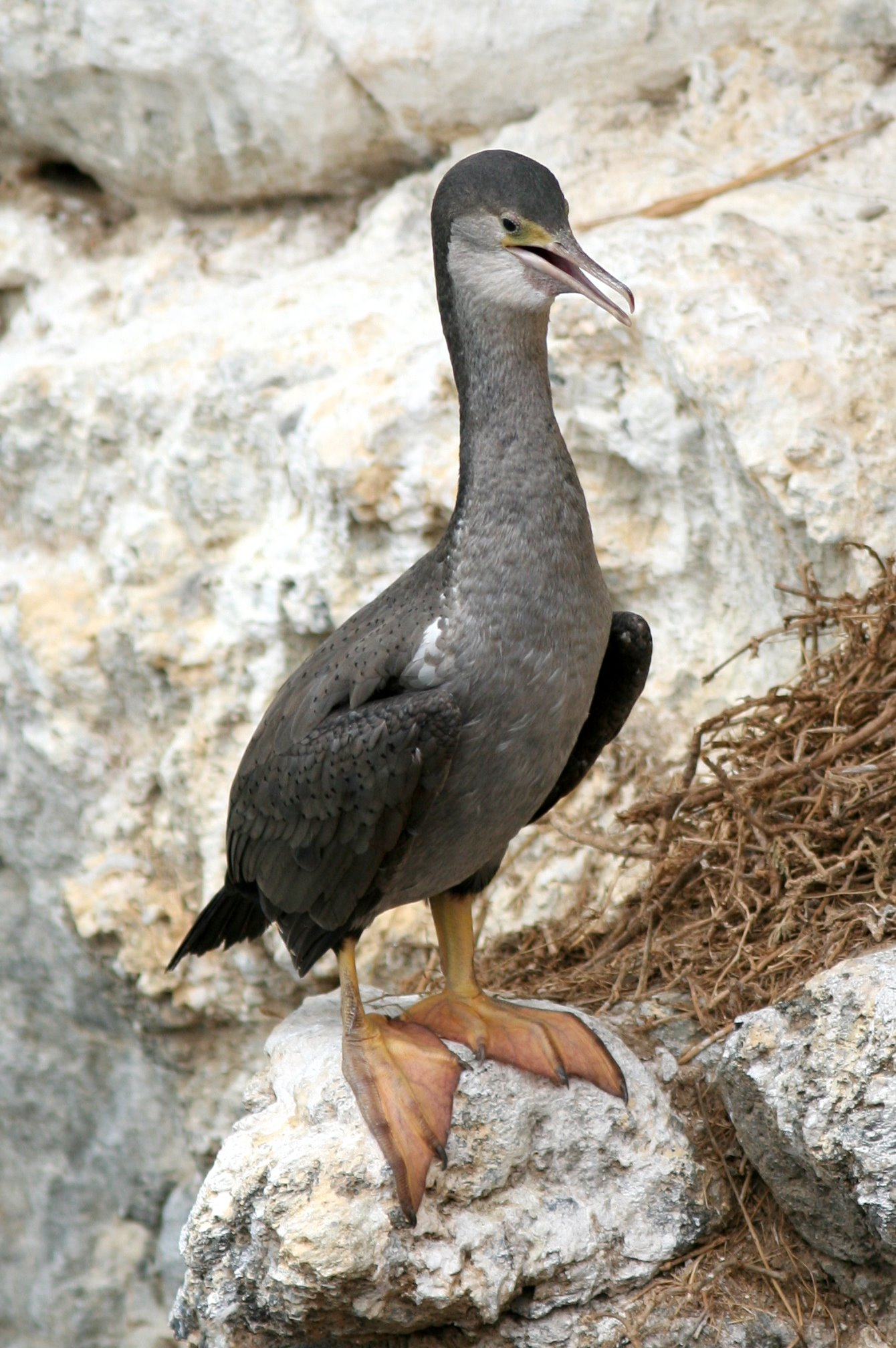
Juvenile, note spots on back and wings

The spotted shag is a medium-sized marine bird. They are usually between 64 and 74 centimetres (25 and 29 in) high and weigh between 700 and 1,200 grams (25 and 42 oz). Their bodies are very slim and they have a very distinctive black, decurved, double crest growing on their nape and their forehead. They have a long, slender, orange-brown coloured, hooked bill and yellow-orange feet. The feathers on their bodies are grey and blue. The adults have small black spots on their backs and wings, which gave them their name. Their irises are brown, while the ring around the iris is blue. They have a small patch of bare facial skin between their eyes and bill, which turns green-blue just before breeding season. Furthermore, non-breeding adults do not have crests and have paler underparts. The males and females do look very alike, there is almost no sexual dimorphism. However, the males and females can be told apart by their calls and mating behavior. Normally they do not produce much noise, only when they are at resting, roosting and nesting areas. When they produce sounds, it can be heard as loud grunts. Spotted shags usually fly in V-formation and it is hard to tell males and female apart. In flight, they look slender and pale, while their rump and tail look darker. It is hard to estimate the total number of spotted shags in New Zealand; estimates are between 10,000 and 50,000 breeding pairs (20,000 to 100,000 birds). In the past, the number of spotted shags has been limited by the availability of food, which caused an increase in number during the late 1980s.

== Distribution and habitat ==
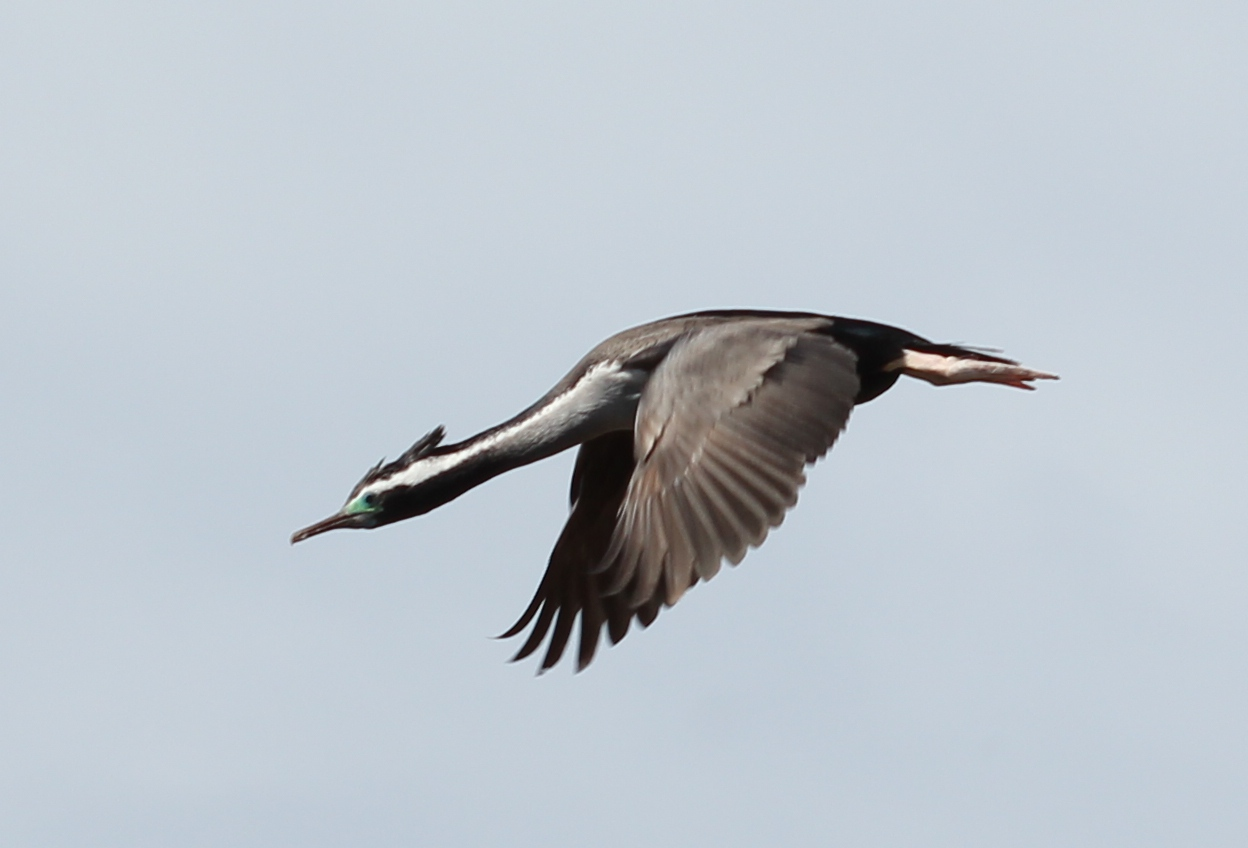
In flight, in breeding plumage (note the double crests)

The spotted shag is endemic to New Zealand. It breeds only on the coastlines of New Zealand and some of the offshore islands, being mainly found on the South Island. High numbers can be found on the west coast and near Stewart Island, but they also inhabit some places on the North Island. During breeding, they can mostly be found on their breeding sites, but otherwise they are more dispersed to other coastal areas. Large colonies can be found around Banks Peninsula near Christchurch, and in a rocky outcrop named the 'Shag Rock' in Wellington Harbour. Phalacrocorax punctatus are locally common, with estimates of numbers nationwide varying from 10,000 to 50,000 pairs.

This species prefers to nest on cliffs along rocky coasts where they occupy ledges or cracks, forming colonies of over a thousand birds. They seldom go into freshwater environments or enclosed estuaries (Heather & Robertson, 2000). Seaweed is often used in lining the nests, the foundation of which is made of sticks.

== Breeding ==
The spotted shag lays one to four (usually three) blue eggs with chalky covering, with both parents continuously guarding the chicks for about 30 days. Chicks do not leave the nest until they are at least 52 days old. They may breed all year round. When the spotted shag hatches, it is completely blind, naked and weak and has very poor coordination. They will beg their parents for food, but are not able to direct it. Between day 4 and 6, their eyes start to open and between day 7 and 11 their begging starts to become more directed towards the parent. They also become a lot stronger and they start calling loudly. Down starts to cover their body and is becoming thicker between day 12 and 17. Then, they also become more active and start flapping their wings. Between day 18 and 23, the chicks start to move more rapidly, though clumsily. By this time, the tail feathers have grown to about 1 cm. Between day 24 and 30, the spotted contour feathers are developing on the top surface of their wings. Some chicks start to leave the nests. Between day 30 and 35, the birds have almost reached adult size, but the down is still covering their bodies. The contour feathers will appear between day 35 and 40 and will be complete between day 40 and 50. By this time, the tail is also fully grown and many birds will have left the nests to form small groups. Later in life, they will form monogamous breeding pairs. Breeding colonies can sometimes consist of even 700 pairs. These pairs lay 3 to 4 blue eggs and the tasks of incubation and the rearing of the chicks are shared. Both parents feed the young by the ordinary manner in the nest. The fast flight of spotted shags up to a cliff-side perch makes its approach to nest spectacular. After breeding, most spotted shags remain within 200 kilometres of their breeding grounds. They form large winter flocks of up to 2000 birds, often flying in long lines between their feeding and roosting areas.

It is common to find red-billed gull hanging around the spotted shag colony. Also, it is easy to find that the gulls' nesting colony are built nearby. The fact is that after the young spotted shag have been fed, parents have to leave nests to find more food to raise their young shags. At this moment, gulls forthwith fly to the nest and standing on the edge of it, their whole manner and tone of voice convey the impression of swearing. The young immediately disgorge some of their food, which the gull promptly eats.

== Diet and foraging ==
Queen Charlotte Sound, New Zealand

Spotted shags are able to feed up to 16 km offshore. Their main diet consists of small fish and marine invertebrates, but they barely affect the New Zealand fish stock. The birds catch fish by diving from the sea surface and propelling themselves underwater with their webbed feet. They dive for an average of about 30 seconds, usually resting on the surface for 10 to 15 seconds between dives. The longest dive ever recorded was 70 seconds. Spotted shags often carry some small stones in their gizzard, which might function as to grind food or to avoid unwanted gut parasites. Sometimes they may be seen fishing singly, but more often a number are seen together, fishing by long dives or following a shoal.

== Predators, parasites and disease ==
Some birds are accidentally caught by fishing nets and drown. Spotted shags might be affected by the lice species Eidmanniella pellucida (Rudow, 1869) and Pectinopygus punctatus (Timmermann, 1964) (Pilgrim & Palma, 1982). Furthermore, they might be affected by the following tick species: Carios capensis (Neumann, 1901), Ixodes eudyptidis (Maskell, 1885), Ixodes jacksoni (Hoogstraal, 1967) that only appears on the spotted shag and Ixodes uriae (White, 1852) (Heath et al., 2011). They also might carry the flea species Parapsyllus longicornis (Enderlein, 1901) (Part & Part, 1990). The spotted shag does not appear to be subject to significant predation and disease. A parasite that may affect it is Contracaecum spiculigerum, Eustrongylides sp.

== Conservation status ==
The species is considered to be not threatened. However, although the species used to be prevalent in the Hauraki Gulf, their populations have undergone a significant decline in the last century. DNA analysis has recently indicated that the birds originating from the northern parts of New Zealand are genetically distinct thus increasing the concern over the continuing decline of the species in and around Auckland.

== In culture ==
In 1988, New Zealand released a series of postage stamps devoted to the native birds of the country. The spotted shag was featured on the 60-cent stamp.
