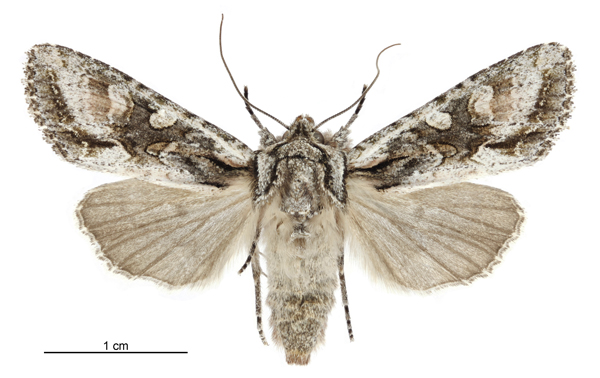
- Female
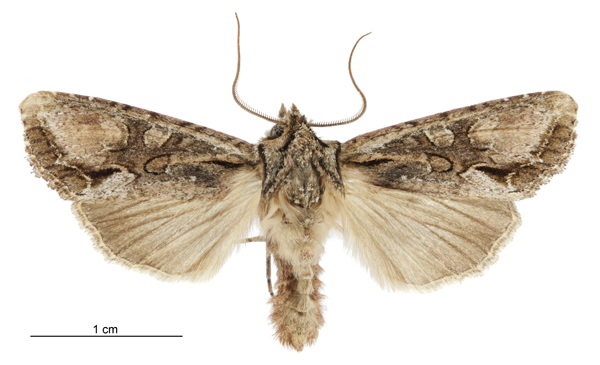
- Male

Scientific classification
- Kingdom: Animalia
- Phylum: Arthropoda
- Clade: Pancrustacea
- Class: Insecta
- Order: Lepidoptera
- Superfamily: Noctuoidea
- Family: Noctuidae
- Genus: Ichneutica
- Species: I. mutans

Binomial name
- Ichneutica mutans (Walker, 1857)

Synonyms
- Hadena mutans Walker, 1857; Hadena lignifusca Walker, 1857; Xylina spurcata Walker, 1857; Xylina vexata Walker, 1865; Mamestra acceptrix Felder & Rogenhofer, 1875; Mamestra passa Morrison, 1874; Maoria mutans (Walker, 1857); Hadena debilis Butler, 1877; Mamestra mutans (Walker, 1857); Melanchra mutans (Walker, 1857); Graphania mutans (Walker, 1857); Maoria mutans pallescens Warren, 1912

= Ichneutica mutans =

Species of moth

Ichneutica mutans, commonly known as the New Zealand cutworm or the grey-brown cutworm, is a moth of the family Noctuidae. This moth endemic to New Zealand and can be found throughout New Zealand, including from Three Kings Islands down to Stewart Island. However this species is not found in the Chatham Islands. The adult moths are on the wing all year round. I. mutans is variable in appearance and can be confused with similar species in the same genus. As a result of the variety of host species consumed by the larvae of the species, including such crops as turnips, wheat and apples, this species is regarded as an agricultural pest. However between the early 1960s and late 1980s the population of I. mutans was shown to have decreased significantly, by over 80%, at two study sites.

== Taxonomy ==
This species was first described by Francis Walker in 1857. The lectotype specimen is held at the Natural History Museum, London. The type locality of I. mutans is presumed by Robert Hoare to be Auckland. As a result of the variability in the appearance of I. mutans Walker, thinking he was describing new species, went on to describe it numerous times under the names Hadena lignifusca, Xylina spurcata, Xylina vexata. Other entomologists were also misled by the variable appearance of this moth into thinking they too were describing a new species. They used the names Mamestra acceptrix, Mamestra passa and Hadena debilis. Some of these subsequent names, H. lignifusca, M. acceptrix and H. debilis, were synonymised by Edward Meyrick in 1887 when he transferred the species to the genus Mamestra. X. spurcata and X. vexata were synonymised by Meyrick in 1912 and M. passa was synonymised by John G. Franclemont in 1981. In 1988 J. S. Dugdale in his catalogue placed this species within the Graphania genus. In 2019 Robert Hoare undertook a major review of New Zealand Noctuidae. During this review the genus Ichneutica was greatly expanded and the genus Graphania was subsumed into that genus as a synonym. As a result of this review, this species is now known as Ichneutica mutans.

== Description ==
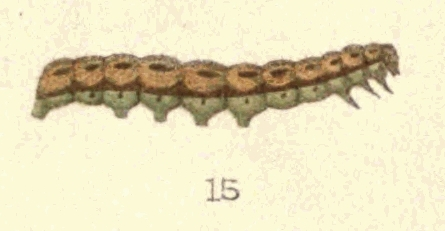
Drawing of larva of Ichneutica mutans by George Hudson

George Hudson described the larva of this species as follows:

The larva is rather stout, with the anterior segments wrinkled. It varies much in colour; the dorsal surface is usually reddish-brown; the lateral line is broad and black; a series of subdorsal stripes also black; the ventral surface is green. Sometimes these markings are hardly visible, and the larva is entirely green, whilst occasionally the brown colouring predominates.

Walker in his original description of I. mutans described the adult of the species as follows:

Male and female. Pale cinereous. Third joint of the palpi cylindrical, full one-third of the length of the second. Antennae of the male minutely ciliated. Thorax with a black curved band in front. Fore wings with black marks along the costa; most of the disk clouded with fawn-colour and with blackish gray; lines almost obsolete, except the submarginal one, which is distinct, whitish, slightly undulating, bordered on each side by black and brown, and interrupted by the black veins; a black discal stripe, dilated towards its tip, and widely interrupted by the space which includes the black-bordered claviform spot; orbicular and reniform spots distinct, partly bordered with black, the former oblique, a little more than half the size of the latter. Hind wings cinereous, with whitish ciliae.
Var. Fore wings with the disk hardly clouded; black stripe obsolete, except at each end. Length of the body 6 — 7 lines; of the wings 14 — 16 lines.

I. mutans is variable and as a result the species can be confused with I. averilla and I. petrograpta as well as I. bromias despite the fact that the later species is not found in the same area as I. mutans.

== Distribution ==
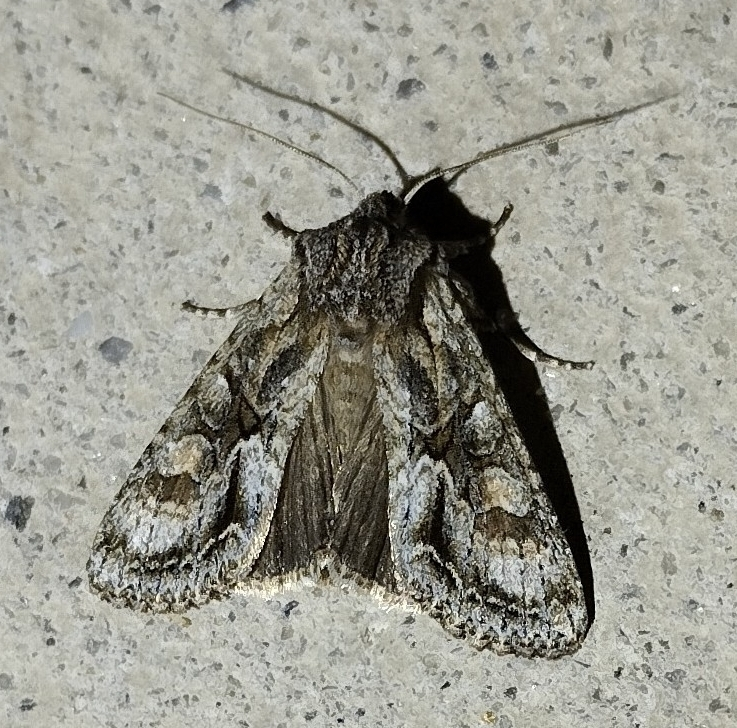
I. mutans, Wānaka

This species is endemic to New Zealand. I. mutans can be found throughout New Zealand, including from Three Kings Islands down to Stewart Island. However this species is not found in the Chatham Islands.

== Habitat ==
I. mutans is adept at existing in a variety of native and also modified habitats.

== Behaviour ==
The larvae of I. mutans was described by Hudson as being sluggish. I. mutans adults are on the wing all months of the year. This species is attracted to light and have been collected via a mercury vapour light trap.

== Life history and host species ==
The larvae feed on a variety of herbaceous plants including those used to create pasture for stock, weeds such as Pilosella officinarum, as well as crops such as turnips, peas, wheat, and the leaves and fruit of apple trees. This species is therefore sometimes considered an agricultural pest. I. mutans pupates on the ground or on moss. The length of time this species in the pupal state depends on the season in which it pupates as well as what part of the country. If in summer it can be a short period of time, but if in autumn the adult does not emerge until the following spring. In the North Island it is thought that I. mutans may have up to four generations a year where as in the South Island this is likely to be reduced to two.

== Interaction with humans ==
A recent study suggests this moth may be assisting with the pollination of avocado trees.

== Conservation ==
Although this species is common and widespread there have been large declines in the population of this species. In 1991 the entomologist Graeme White published a paper documenting population declines in this species at two sites of between 84% and 91% during 1962 and 1989. White hypothesised that this decline was as a result of the dominance of the introduced grass species Agrostis capillaris and the resulting displacement of native plant species upon which the larvae of I. mutans feed.
