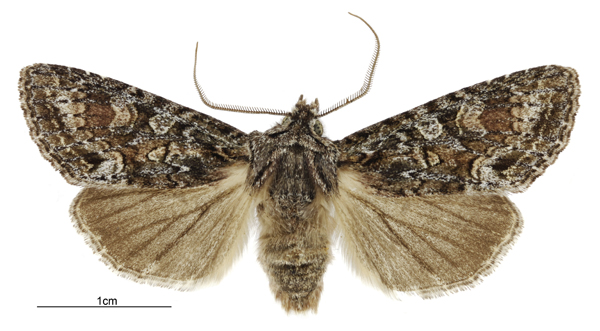
- Male
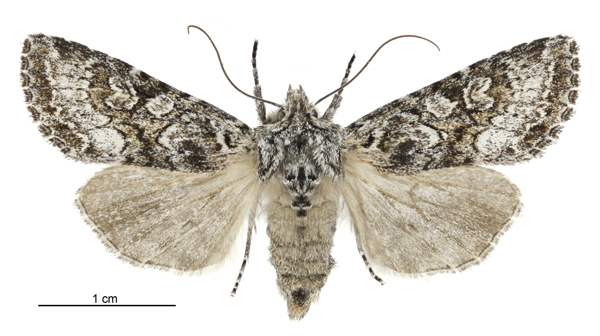
- Female

Scientific classification
- Kingdom: Animalia
- Phylum: Arthropoda
- Clade: Pancrustacea
- Class: Insecta
- Order: Lepidoptera
- Superfamily: Noctuoidea
- Family: Noctuidae
- Genus: Ichneutica
- Species: I. petrograpta

Binomial name
- Ichneutica petrograpta (Meyrick, 1929)

Synonyms
- Melanchra petrograpta Meyrick, 1929; Graphania petrograpta (Meyrick, 1929)

= Ichneutica petrograpta =

Species of moth

Ichneutica petrograpta is a moth of the family Noctuidae. This species is endemic to New Zealand where it is found in the southwest districts of the South Island, including Westland, Otago Lakes and Fiordland. It is very similar in appearance to I. mutans. It inhabits tussock and shrubland in the alpine to subalpine zones. Adults of I. petrograpta are on the wing from December to February and are attracted to sugar traps. The life history of this species is unknown as are the host species of its larvae.

== Taxonomy ==
This species was described by Edward Meyrick in 1929 from a specimen collected by George Hudson near Lake Wakatipu in January. Meyrick named the species Melanchra petrograpta. The holotype specimen is held at the Natural History Museum, London. In 1988 J. S. Dugdale in his catalogue discussed this species under the genus Graphania. In 2019 Robert Hoare undertook a major review of New Zealand Noctuidae. During this review the genus Ichneutica was greatly expanded and the genus Graphania was subsumed into that genus as a synonym. As a result of this review, this species is now known as Ichneutica petrograpta.

== Description ==
Meyrick described the species as follows:

♀. 42 mm. Head, palpi, thorax fuscous mixed whitish and blackish. Forewings elongate-triangular, termen obliquely rounded, waved; grey, irrorated blackish and whitish; a small white spot in middle of base; lines white, blackish-edged, waved, subbasal curved, first rather irregular, slightly bent on fold, second sinuate, subterminal parallel to termen, slightly indented near extremities; median band darker grey irrorated blackish, without white irroration, median shade obscurely blackish, dentate; spots outlined white and then blackish, claviform small, wedged-shaped, resting on first line, orbicular rather oblique, oval, reniform narrow slightly bent in middle : cilia grey narrowly barred white. Hindwings grey; cilia light grey, slenderly barred whitish, outer half whitish.

The male of this species has a wingspan of between 39 and 44 mm where as the female of the species has a wingspan of between 38 and 40 mm. I. petrograpta is very similar in appearance to I. mutans. Although females of these two species may be distinguished by markings on the forewings, males are more difficult to distinguish visually. When comparing the males of both species, I. petrograpta specimens are slightly darker in appearance and have antenna with slightly longer pectinations.

== Distribution ==
I. petrograpta is endemic to New Zealand. This species is found only in the southwest portion of the South Island in the districts of Westland, Otago Lakes and Fiordland.

== Habitat ==
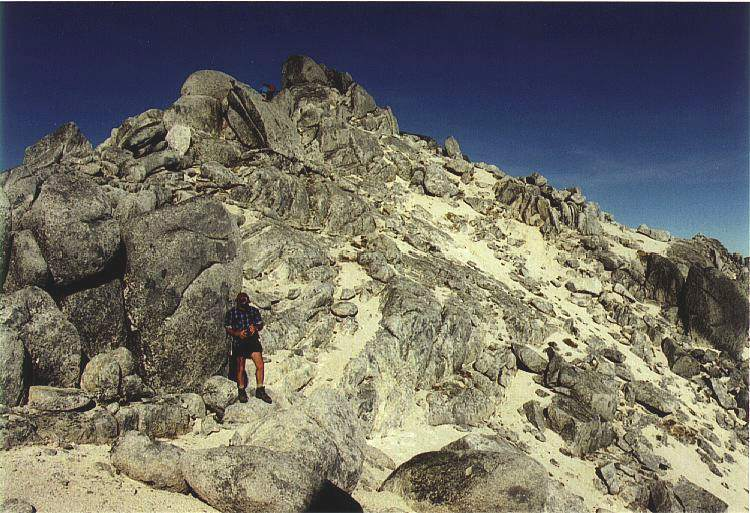
Mount Titiroa

This species inhabits tussock grasslands and shrublands in alpine and subalphine zones. This species has been observed at Mount Titiroa in tussock grasslands.

== Behaviour ==
Adults of this species are attracted to sugar traps and have also been collected with a mercury vapour moth trap. The adults of the species are on the wing from December to February.

== Life history and host species ==
The life history of this species is unknown as are the host species of the larvae.
