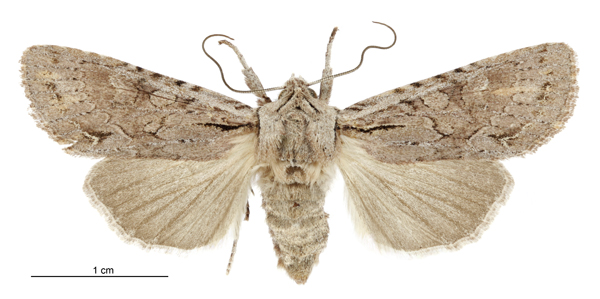
- Female
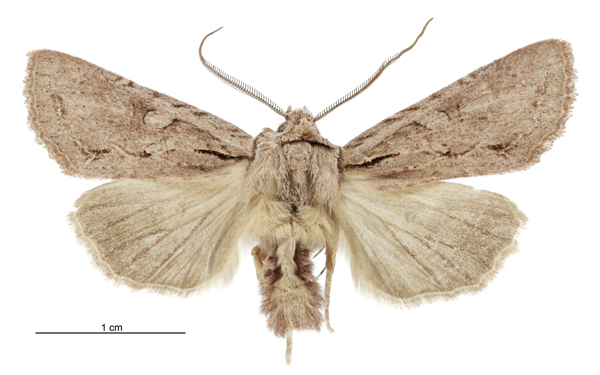
- Male

Scientific classification
- Kingdom: Animalia
- Phylum: Arthropoda
- Clade: Pancrustacea
- Class: Insecta
- Order: Lepidoptera
- Superfamily: Noctuoidea
- Family: Noctuidae
- Genus: Ichneutica
- Species: I. averilla

Binomial name
- Ichneutica averilla (Hudson, 1921)

Synonyms
- Melanchra averilla Hudson, 1921; Melanchra furtiva Philpott, 1924; Graphania averilla (Hudson, 1921)

= Ichneutica averilla =

Species of moth

Ichneutica averilla is a moth of the family Noctuidae. It is endemic to New Zealand. This species is found in the North Island at Mount Taranaki but is widespread throughout the South Island and Stewart Island. It prefers mountainous habitat but can be found down to sea level in the southern parts of the South Island. Adults of the species are on the wing between November and March. Larvae likely exist on a variety of herbaceous plants but have been recorded as feeding on species within the genus Plantago. This species is sometimes confused with I. mutas but can be distinguished from the latter on the basis of forewing colour (I. averilla has a forewing shaded a uniform red-ochreous colour) as well as the absence of or an indistinct antemedian forewing line.

== Taxonomy ==
Ichneutica averilla was first described by George Hudson in 1921 under the name Melanchra averill. Hudson used the two female specimens of the moth collected by Averil Lysaght in December 1920 on Mount Taranaki. The lectotype specimen of this species is held at the Museum of New Zealand Te Papa Tongarewa. In 1924 Alfred Philpott, thinking this was a new species, described this moth under the name Melanchra furtiva from specimens collected around Mount Arthur as well as in the mountainous areas near Lake Wakatipu. In 1988 John S. Dugdale placed this species within the genus Graphania and recognised Melanchra furtiva as a new synonym. In 2019 Robert Hoare undertook a major review of New Zealand Noctuidae. During this review the genus Ichneutica was greatly expanded and the genus Graphania was subsumed into that genus as a synonym. As a result of this review, this species is now known as Ichneutica averilla.

== Description ==
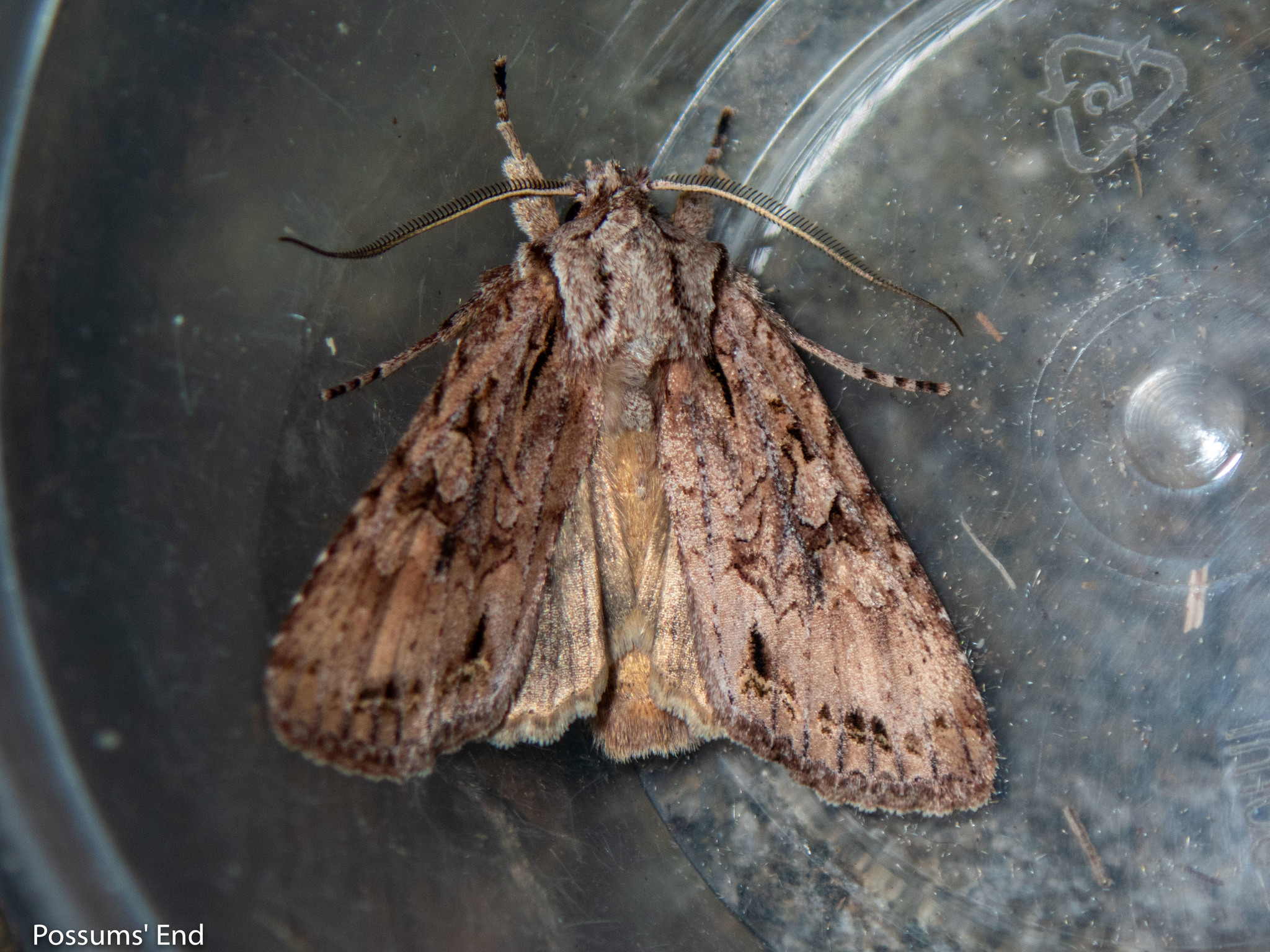
Ichneutica averilla observation confirmed by Robert Hoare

Hudson described the larvae of this species as follows:

The length of the full grown larva is about 1 1/8 inches (30 mm). Cylindrical, slightly flattened, tapering moderately towards head; hindslope moderate, rather irregular; segmental divisions deep, especially towards ventral surface. Head ochreous-brown, with dark stripe on each side. Body rather dark purplish-grey on back, pale green below lateral line, with a very irregular paler intermediate area of dull orange-ochreous; a very broken pale subdorsal line, its components slightly convergent on each segment; eight very conspicuous black bars on the lateral portions of segments 5-13 [A1–A8], with a distinct paler patch behind each bar; these bars terminate on the spiracle and are charachteristic; legs and prolegs green, tipped with brown. Rather variable in depth of colour and distinctness of markings ...

Hudson, in his original description, described the female adult of the species as follows:

The expansion of the wings of the female is about 1 5/8 inches. The fore wings have the costa nearly straight and the termen rather obliquely rounded with slight sinuations; pinkish-brown much suffused with grey, especially towards the base and termen; the principal markings are very finely indicated in black; there is a conspicuous curved longitudinal streak from the base to about 1/8; the first line is indistinct, very wavy, faintly outlined in brown; the claviform is small, cone-shaped; the orbicular is large, irregularly oval, almost wholly outlined in black; the reniform is large, rather indistinct, outlined in brown towards the base, but otherwise faintly indicated by grey shading; the second line is very faint, grey, sharply bent inwards before the dorsum; there is a series of dark-edged whitish subterminal dots and a V-shaped dark spot near the tornus; the tornal area is clouded with brownish-ochreous and the cilia are also brownish-ochreous. The hind wings are greyish-ochreous, darker towards the termen; the cilia are greyish-ochreous with whitish tips. The head, thorax, and fore legs are greyish-white, very finely speckled with pinkish-brown; the basal third of the antennae is whitish, the remaining portion blackish.

I. averilla is a medium-sized moth. The adult male of the species has a wingspan of between 33 and 41 mm whereas the female has a wingspan of between 36 and 41 mm. The forewings of this species are pinkish brown coloured, tinged with grey and have dark markings with a notable streak running lengthwise from the forewing base. There is also a distinctive v-shaped dark mark on the posterior corner of the wing. The hind wings of this species are greyish brown in colour.

This species can be confused with I. mutans but can be distinguished on forewing colour as I. averilla has a ground colour of uniform red-ochreous shade where as I. mutans is more brown with blackish hints. Also the antemedian forewing line is normally distinct in I. mutans where as in I. averilla it is absent or just a hint of pale scaling is present.

== Distribution ==
This species is endemic to New Zealand. It is found in the North Island, but only in the Mount Taranaki area. This species is widespread throughout the South Island, where it has been collected in such areas as on Mount Arthur, around Ben Lomond, Elfin Bay, Lake Luna and Lake MacKenzie in Otago, and at the Cass Basin in the Waimakariri River catchment. I. averilla is also present on Stewart Island.

== Habitat ==
I. averilla inhabits mountainous country. However it can be found down to sea level altitudes in the southern parts of the South Island, such as in the Catlins.

== Behaviour ==
The adult moths can be found on the wing from November to March. They are attracted to light and have been collected via a mercury vapour light trap.

== Life history and host plants ==
After emerging the larvae eat their egg shell. The larvae of I. averilla have been found to feed on plants in the genus Plantago and it is likely the larvae of this species feeds on a variety of plant hosts.
