= Pitt Strait =

Strait between Chatham Island and Pitt Island, New Zealand

Coordinates: 44°09′S 176°20′W

Pitt Strait is a channel, 25 kilometres (16 mi) wide, separating Chatham Island and Pitt Island, the two largest islands in New Zealand's Chatham Islands.
