= Psilocnaeia aegrota =

Scientific classification
- Kingdom: Animalia
- Phylum: Arthropoda
- Class: Insecta
- Order: Coleoptera
- Suborder: Polyphaga
- Infraorder: Cucujiformia
- Family: Cerambycidae
- Genus: Psilocnaeia
- Species: P. aegrota

Binomial name
- Psilocnaeia aegrota (Bates, 1874)

Synonyms
- Xylotoles aegrotus Bates, 1874

Species of beetle

Psilocnaeia aegrota is a species of beetle in the family Cerambycidae. It was described by Henry Walter Bates in 1874. It is endemic to New Zealand.

Psilocnaeia aegrota measure 4–5 mm (0.16–0.20 in).
