= Xylotoles traversii =

Scientific classification
- Domain: Eukaryota
- Kingdom: Animalia
- Phylum: Arthropoda
- Class: Insecta
- Order: Coleoptera
- Suborder: Polyphaga
- Infraorder: Cucujiformia
- Family: Cerambycidae
- Genus: Xylotoles
- Species: X. traversii

Binomial name
- Xylotoles traversii Pascoe, 1876

Synonyms
- Xylotoles schauinslandi Sharp, 1903

Species of beetle

Xylotoles traversii is a species of beetle in the family Cerambycidae. It was described by Pascoe in 1876. It is known from New Zealand.
