= Pitt Island =

Island of the Chatham Islands archipelago in New Zealand

Rangihaute (Moriori) Rangiauria (Māori)
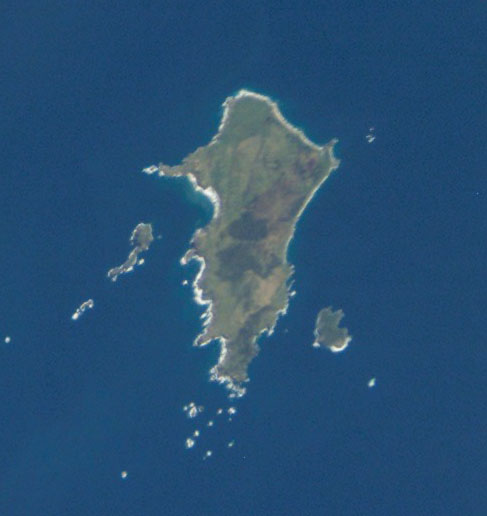
- Pitt Island from space

- Map showing location of Pitt Island

Geography
- Coordinates: 44°17′15″S 176°13′12″W
- Archipelago: Chatham Islands
- Area: 68.06 km^{2} (26.28 sq mi)
- Highest elevation: 241 m (791 ft)
- Highest point: Waihere

Administration
- New Zealand

Demographics
- Population: 43 (2023)
- Pop. density: 0.63/km^{2} (1.63/sq mi)

Pitt Island (Moriori: Rangihaute, Māori: Rangiauria) is the second largest island in New Zealand's Chatham Islands, with an area of 65 square kilometres (25 sq mi). It lies about 770 kilometres (480 mi) to the east of New Zealand's main islands, and about 20 kilometres (12 mi) to the southeast of Chatham Island, from which it is separated by Pitt Strait. The island is hilly; its highest point (Waihere Head) rises to 241 metres (791 ft) above sea level. As of 2011, Pitt Island had a population of about 38 people.

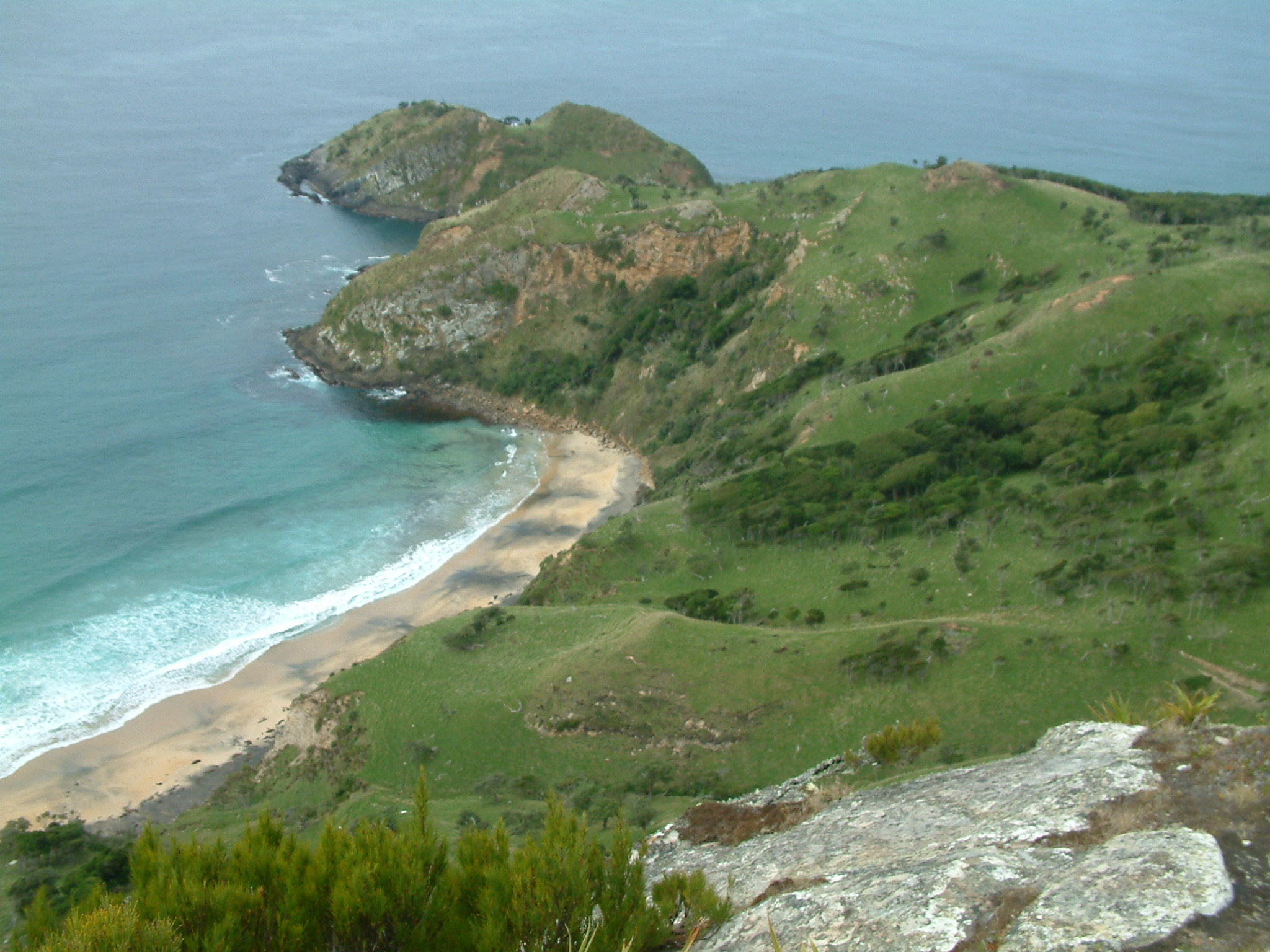
Kahuitara Point seen from Mount Hakepa

Pitt Island's Kahuitara Point is the first populated location on Earth to observe a sunrise in each new year, based on local time zone.

== History ==
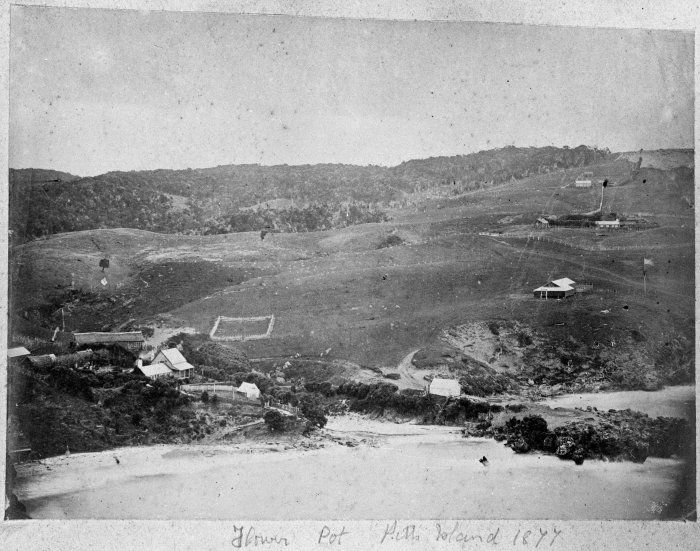
Flower Pot Bay in the northwest 1877

Pitt Island was originally inhabited by the Moriori, the indigenous peoples of the Chatham Islands, who called it Rangiaotea or Rangihaute. Their archaeological remains are found almost everywhere on the island; large quantities of artefacts are constantly coming to light. No remains of momori rakau are visible on the island, but there are records of them once being present.

The first Europeans to see and name Chatham Island were the crew of William Robert Broughton's ship HMS Chatham in November 1791. However, they did not see Pitt Island. The first to do so was Captain Charles Johnston on HMS Cornwallis in May 1807. He named it 'Pitt's Island' after William Pitt, 1st Earl of Chatham. In 1840, the name was simplified to "Pitt" Island. Taranaki Maori who invaded the Chatham Islands in 1835 called it Rangiauria, a name which is still in use today.

Over the years there have been many ships wrecked around both Pitt and Chatham Islands. One of these was the Australian sealing brig Glory, which was wrecked on Pitt Island in what became known as Glory Bay in January 1827.

European settlers arrived in the Flower Pot Bay in 1843.

== Demographics ==
Pitt Island covers 68.06 km^{2} (26.28 sq mi).

Historical population
Year	Pop.	±% p.a.
2006	42	—
2013	39	−1.05%
2018	39	+0.00%
2023	42	+1.49%

Pitt Island had a population of 42 in the 2023 New Zealand census, an increase of 3 people (7.7%) since the 2018 census, and an increase of 3 people (7.7%) since the 2013 census. There were 27 males and 15 females in 18 dwellings. The median age was 38.1 years (compared with 38.1 years nationally). There were 12 people (28.6%) aged under 15 years, 3 (7.1%) aged 15 to 29, 21 (50.0%) aged 30 to 64, and 6 (14.3%) aged 65 or older.

People could identify as more than one ethnicity. The results were 78.6% European (Pākehā), 71.4% Māori, and 14.3% other, which includes people giving their ethnicity as "New Zealander". English was spoken by 100.0%, and Māori by 7.1%.

The sole religious affiliation given was 35.7% Christian. People who answered that they had no religion were 57.1%, and 7.1% of people did not answer the census question.

Of those at least 15 years old, 3 (10.0%) people had a bachelor's or higher degree, 15 (50.0%) had a post-high school certificate or diploma, and 12 (40.0%) people exclusively held high school qualifications. The median income was $23,000, compared with $41,500 nationally. 3 people (10.0%) earned over $100,000 compared to 12.1% nationally. The employment status of those at least 15 was 12 (40.0%) full-time and 9 (30.0%) part-time.

== Economy and facilities ==
The main sources of income for Pitt Islanders are farming, commercial fishing, and tourism. The New Zealand Department of Conservation is active on Pitt Island and, in conjunction with several landowners, administers a number of covenanted areas and reserves. The island imports fuel and most manufactured goods, and exports live sheep and cattle to mainland New Zealand.

The island has a school, a wharf, a church and a grass landing strip for light planes. A gravel road runs from Flower Pot Bay to the airstrip. A supply ship visits Pitt Island about every three months. Each household generates its own electricity, by either diesel generator or wind turbine. Most homes have satellite TV and broadband internet connections. Transport on the island is mostly by means of quad bikes, four wheel drives and occasionally horses. In 2011, the Pitt Island School had eight children, aged between 6 and 12 years.

Air Chathams operates from Pitt Island to Chatham Island with their Cessna 206.

== Fauna and flora ==
On Pitt Island there are several flocks of feral Saxon Merino sheep.

== See also ==
- List of islands of New Zealand
