= Planotortrix puffini =

Scientific classification
- Domain: Eukaryota
- Kingdom: Animalia
- Phylum: Arthropoda
- Class: Insecta
- Order: Lepidoptera
- Family: Tortricidae
- Genus: Planotortrix
- Species: P. puffini

Binomial name
- Planotortrix puffini Dugdale, 1990

Species of moth

Planotortrix puffini is a species of moth of the family Tortricidae. It is endemic to New Zealand. Specimens have been collected from Lee Bay in Stewart Island.

The wingspan is 24–30 mm for males and 26–40 mm for females.

The larvae feed on Brachyglottis reinoldii, Celmisia lindsayi, Olearia colensoi (subspecies colensoi and grandis) and Olearia oporina.
