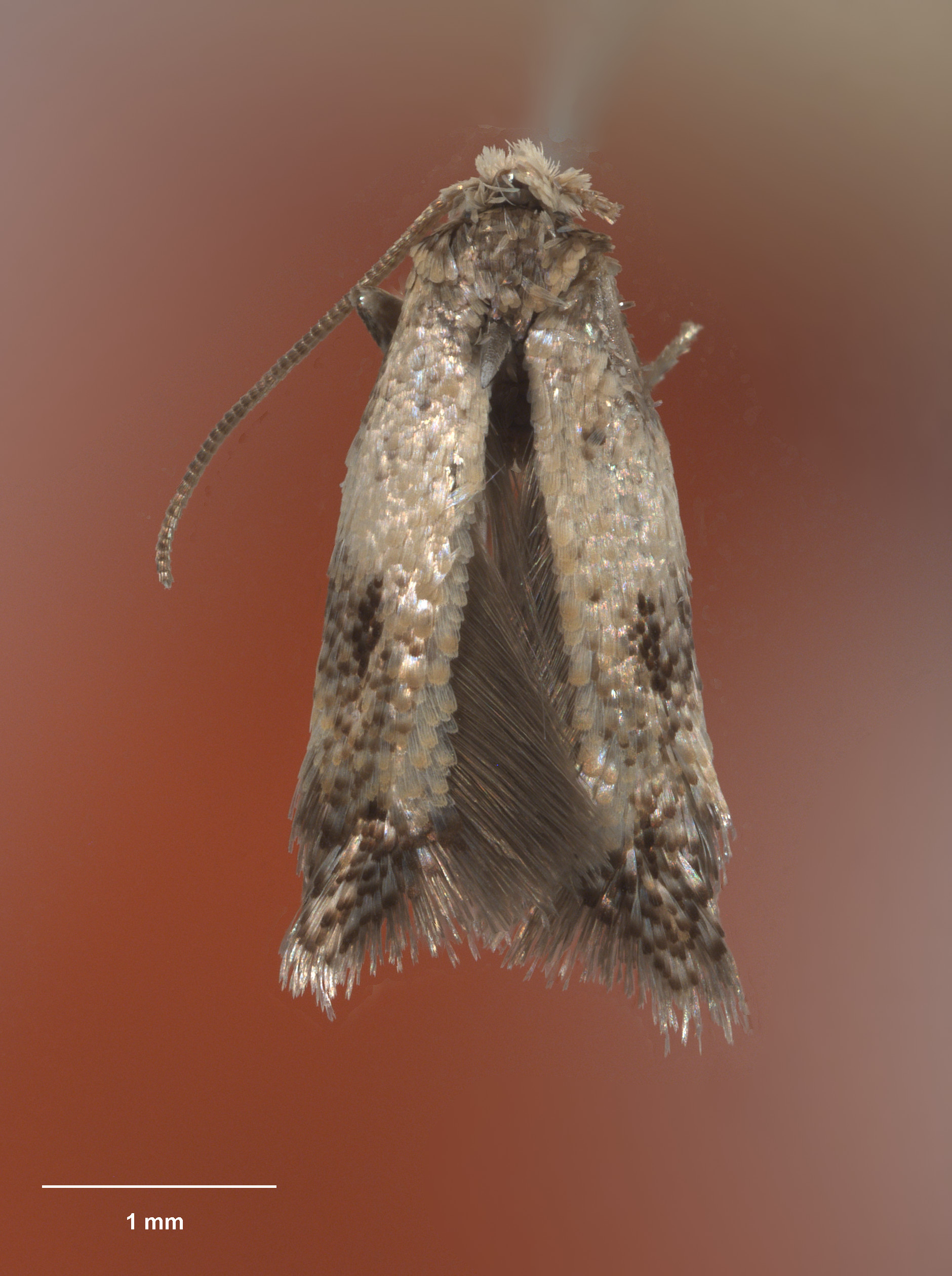
- holotype specimen

Scientific classification
- Kingdom: Animalia
- Phylum: Arthropoda
- Clade: Pancrustacea
- Class: Insecta
- Order: Lepidoptera
- Family: Nepticulidae
- Genus: Stigmella
- Species: S. watti

Binomial name
- Stigmella watti Donner & Wilkinson, 1989

= Stigmella watti =

Species of moth

Stigmella watti is a species of moth in the family Nepticulidae. This species was first described in 1989 by Hans Donner and Christopher Wilkinson. It is endemic to New Zealand and has been observed in Fiordland, Southland and on Stewart Island. The larvae feed on Olearia colensoi νar. grandis (now known as Macrolearia lyallii) and possibly Olearia oporina by mining the leaves of those plants. Larvae have been observed in May while adults are on the wing in February. S. watti was named in honour of Morris N. Watt.

== Taxonomy ==
This species was first described by Hans Donner and Christopher Wilkinson in 1989. It was named in honour of Morris N. Watt, the collector of the male holotype and the two female paratypes. The male holotype specimen, collected at Ocean Beach on Stewart Island, is held at Te Papa.

== Description ==
The larvae are 3–4 mm long and pale green.

The cocoon is brown and attached to the leaves and stem of the host plant.

Donner and Wilkinson described the adult male of this species as follows:

Head. Frontal tuft white; scape and collar yellowish white; antenna silvery grey, comprising about 45 segments. Thorax brown and buff. Forewing about 3.5 mm long, yellowish white, lustrous, reflecting silver; costa with a narrow, brown shoulder line for one-fifth of length; a brown postmedial spot extending terminally and towards costa; apical fifth speckled brown and grey; fringe grey, iridescent, reflecting gold. Hindwing grey, lustrous, reflecting gold; fringe concolorous. Abdomen brown.

The adult female was described by Donner and Wilkinson as follows:

... general appearance much paler, and forewing with medial spot pale brown, smaller, not extended, an additional small postmedial brown spot at costa, and terminal fifth speckled pale brown and yellowish white.

== Distribution ==
This species is endemic to New Zealand. Other than Stewart Island, this species has also been observed in Fiordland and Southland.

== Hosts and behaviour ==
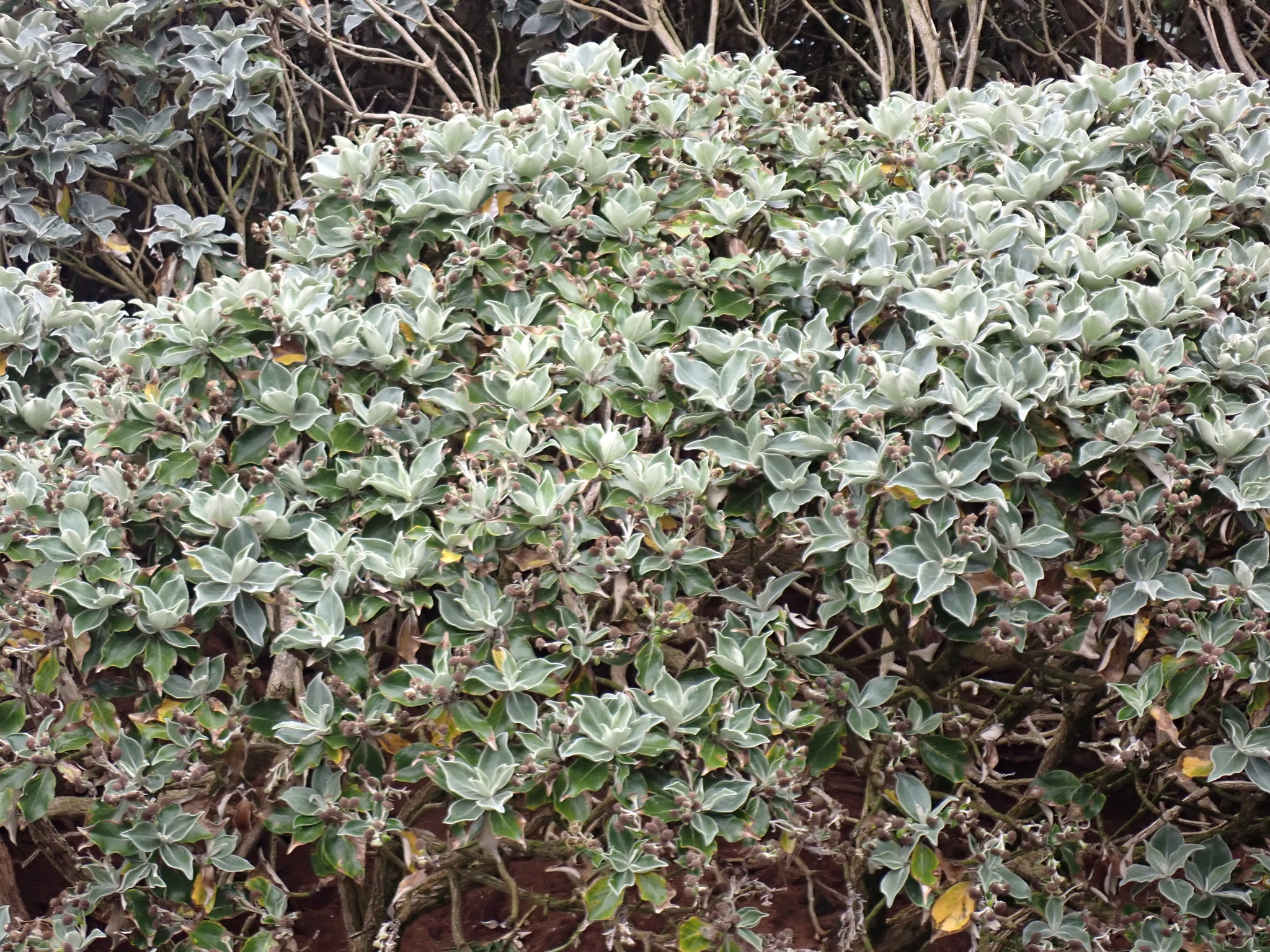
Larval host M. lyallii.

The larvae feed on Olearia colensoi νar. grandis (now known as Macrolearia lyallii) and possibly Olearia oporina. They mine the leaves of their host plant. Larva have been recorded in May. Adults have been recorded in February. There is probably one generation per year.
