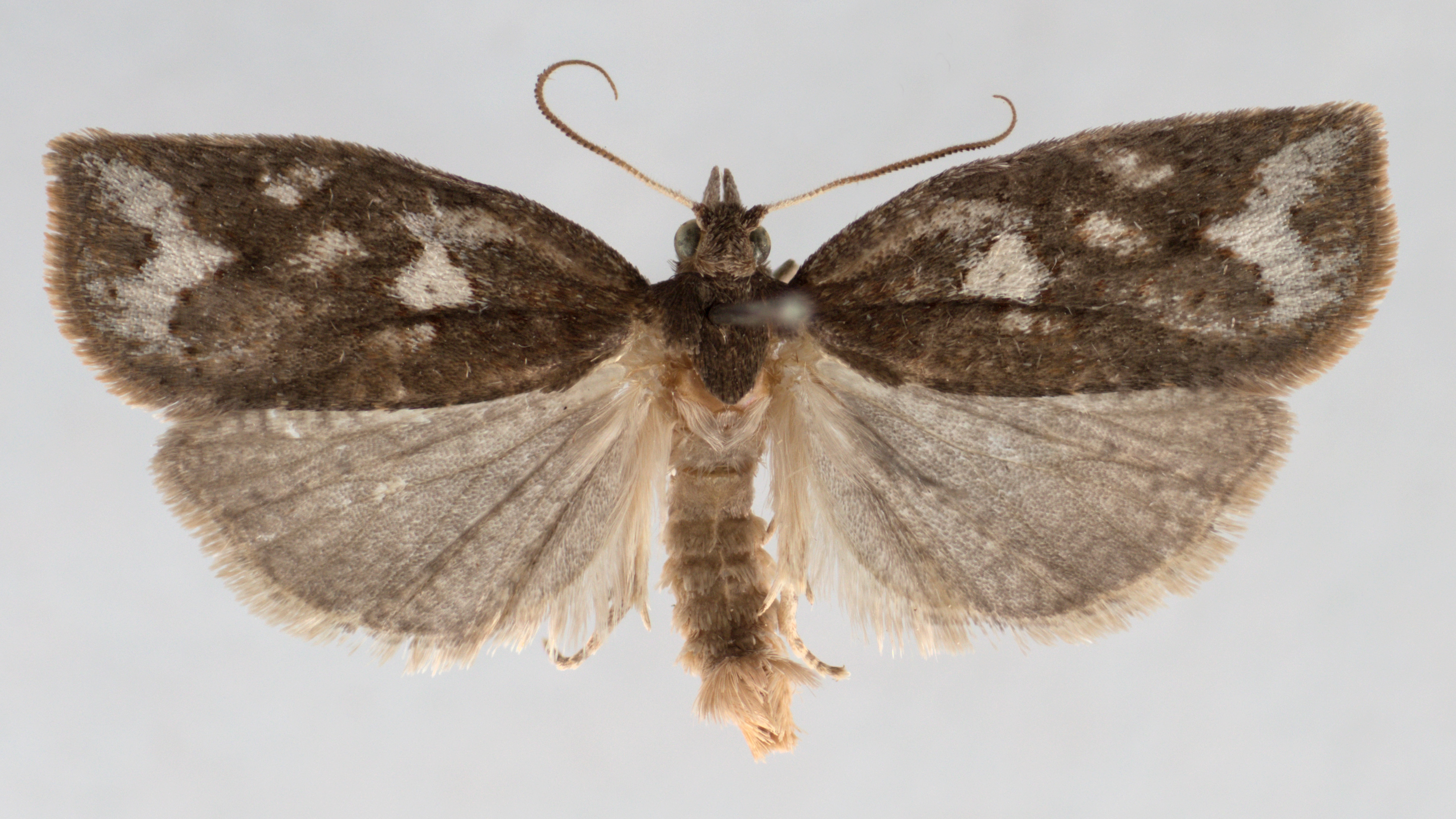
- Planotortrix avicenniae in the New Zealand Arthropod Collection (NZAC) - Ko te Aitanga Pepeke o Aotearoa

Conservation status
- Nationally Critical (NZ TCS)

Scientific classification
- Kingdom: Animalia
- Phylum: Arthropoda
- Clade: Pancrustacea
- Class: Insecta
- Order: Lepidoptera
- Family: Tortricidae
- Genus: Planotortrix
- Species: P. avicenniae

Binomial name
- Planotortrix avicenniae Dugdale, 1990

Synonyms
- Planotortrix Type M; "Planotortrix 1" "M"

= Planotortrix avicenniae =

Species of moth

Planotortrix avicenniae is a species of moth of the family Tortricidae. It is endemic to New Zealand and is found in the North Island. Its larvae feed on mangrove trees. In 2025 this species was classified as "nationally critical" under the New Zealand Threat Classification System by the Department of Conservation as it is impacted by climate change, is data poor and suffers from extreme fluctuations in population.

== Taxonomy and etymology ==
This species was first described in 1990 by John S. Dugdale. The holotype specimen is held in the New Zealand Arthropod Collection. The species name refers to Avicennia, the genus of the larval host plant.

== Description ==
The female of the species can be difficult to distinguish from the females of P. excessana and P. octo. However, the larvae of P. avicenniae are distinctive. Unlike the green headed and bodied larvae of P. excessana and P. octo, they are grey-greenish in colour and have a brownish head.

== Distribution ==
This species is endemic to New Zealand. It has been observed only in the North Island in Northland, Auckland, Waikato, Coromandel, and the Bay of Plenty.

== Biology and behaviour ==
The larvae of this species web together and feed on the leaves of their host plant.

== Habitat and host species ==
The larvae feed only on the mangrove tree species Avicennia marina.

== Conservation status ==
In 2025 this species was classified as "Nationally Critical" with the report stating that this species is impacted by climate change, has a lack of data on both the population size as well as how the population is changing over time, and suffers from extreme fluctuations in population.
