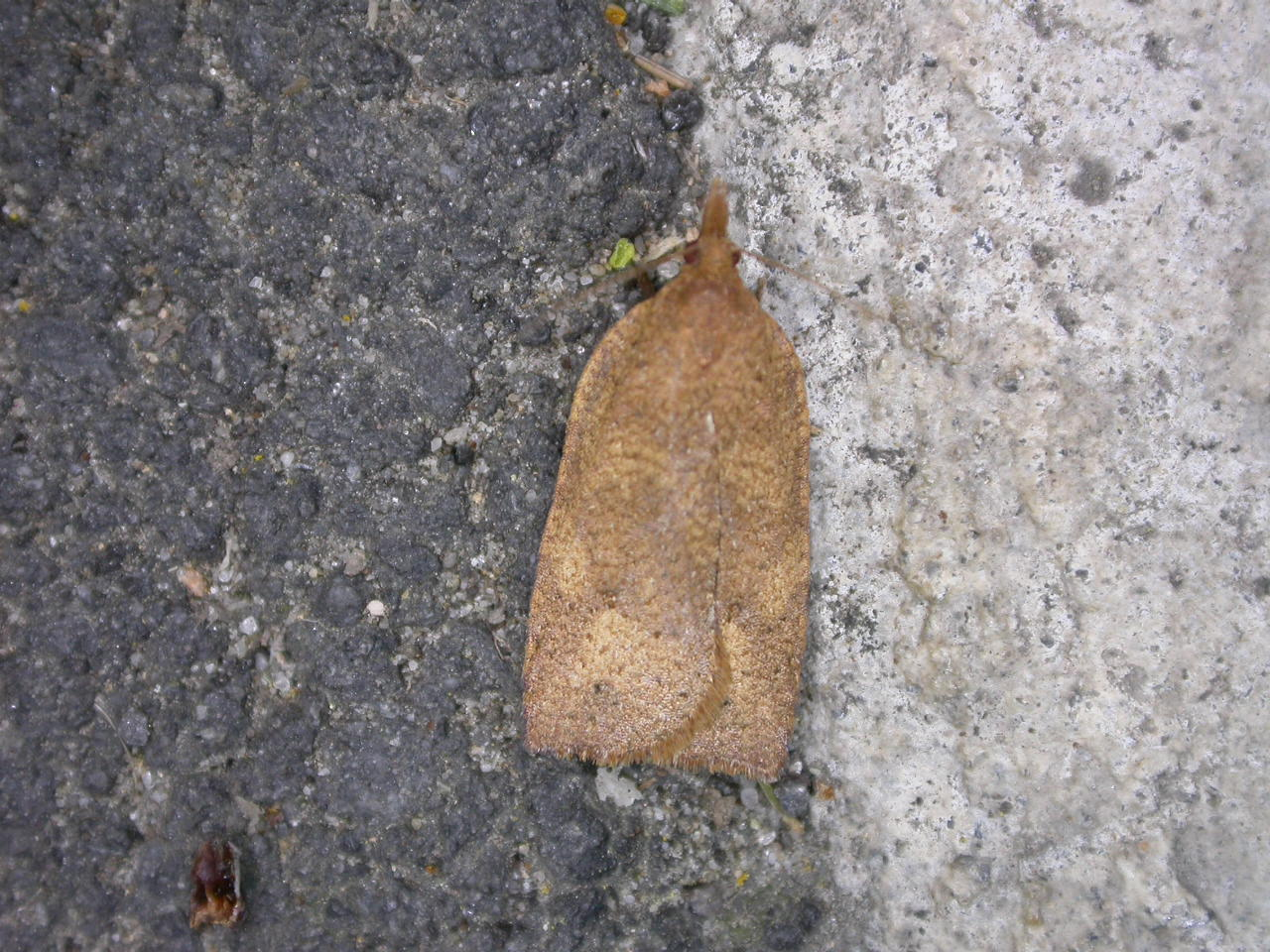

Scientific classification
- Kingdom: Animalia
- Phylum: Arthropoda
- Clade: Pancrustacea
- Class: Insecta
- Order: Lepidoptera
- Family: Tortricidae
- Genus: Planotortrix
- Species: P. excessana

Binomial name
- Planotortrix excessana (Walker, 1863)

Synonyms
- Teras excessana Walker, 1863; Teras biguttana Walker, 1863; Cacoecia excessana (Walker, 1863); Tortrix excessana (Walker, 1863)

= Planotortrix excessana =

Species of moth

Planotortrix excessana, the greenheaded leafroller, is a moth of the family Tortricidae. It is native to New Zealand and is an introduced species in Hawaii. It is extremely variable in appearance and feeds on many native and introduced species. It is regarded as a pest of some agricultural and forestry crops.

== Taxonomy ==
This species was first described by Francis Walker in 1863 using a specimen collected in Nelson by T.R. Oxley and named Teras excessana. It is the type species for Planotortrix. Also in 1963, Walker again described this species, but thinking it new named it Teras biguttana. This name was synonymised by Edward Meyrick in 1883. George Hudson discussed and illustrated this species in 1928 in his work The butterflies and moths of New Zealand. The male lectotype is held at the Natural History Museum, London.

== Description ==
Hudson described the species as follows:

The expansion of the wings varies from 7/8 inch to 1 1/4 inches. The fore-wings of the male are rather broad, the costa strongly arched and the termen distinctly bowed outward and not oblique; dull reddish - brown to bright reddish - brown generally with very obscure blackish markings; there is a very faintly marked basal patch, an indistinct, irregular central band; an indefinite patch below the apex and an obscure discal spot; the outer portions of the wing are often thickly speckled with blackish grey. The hind-wings are pale grey, sometimes slightly tinged with reddish-brown and faintly dappled with darker grey. The female has the forewings longer and narrower and the general colouring usually brighter than the male.

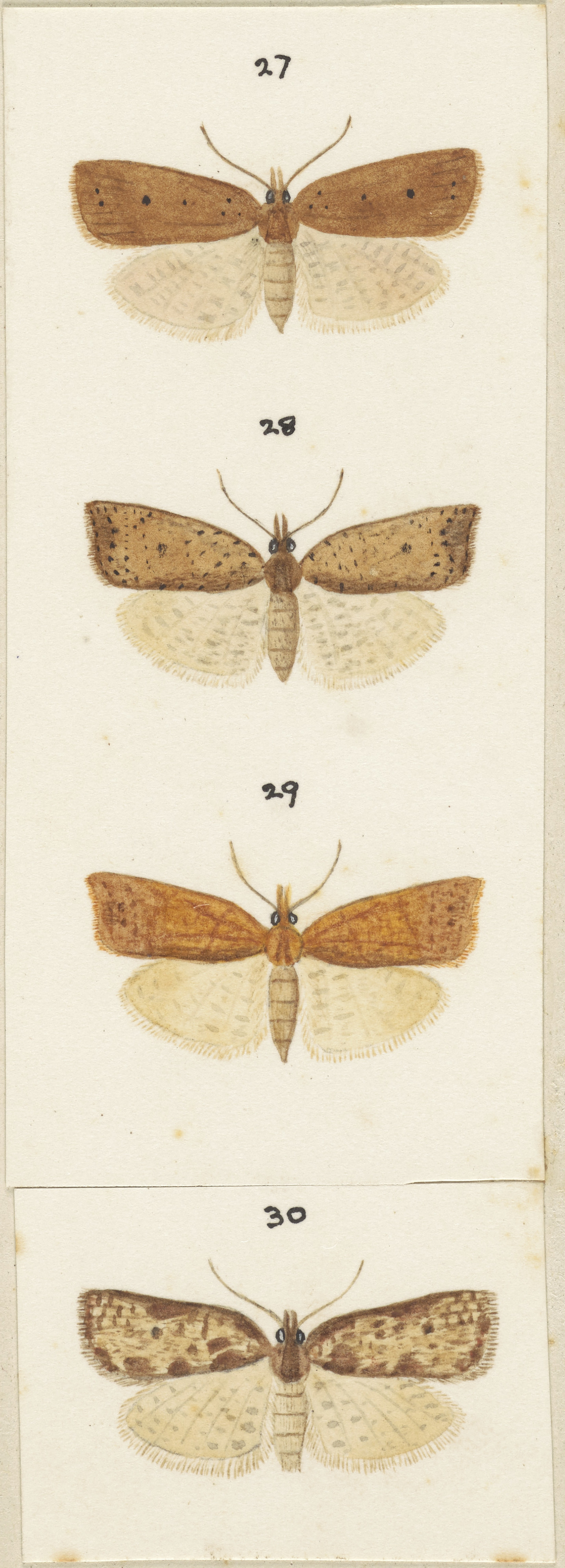
Some forms of P. excessana illustrated by Hudson

This species is extremely variable in appearance with the males possibly having forewings with a large white or pale yellowish spot, alternatively both the males and females can have forewings being ochreous and marbled with dark brown, or finally again both the males and females may have forewings being a dark purplish brown. The females are even more varied than the male. As well as the previously mentioned forms, the females may have forewings coloured a bright orange brown with no distinct markings, or forewings again bright orange brown but densely speckled with dark brown and a faint discal spot and two clear black dots below the apex. The female also might have forewings of warm brown with black discap and subapical spots or forewings again of warm brown but thickly speckled with black except on the area between the central band and apical patch. The female might also have forewings of ochreous-brown with the basal patch and central band well-defined, also a cloudy patch below the apex with possibly the addition of fine dots of black. Finally the female might also have ochreous forewings with the dorsum clouded brown.

Adults of this species are difficult to distinguish from similar species such as P. avicenniae and P. octo. P. excessana are usually warmly-coloured and sometimes patterned in contrast to the more dull tones of the previously mentioned species. The diamond shaped white or cream patch in the forewing is present in some individuals of all Planotortrix species.

The eggs of P. excessana have an opaque appearance. The larvae are entirely coloured green.

== Distribution ==
P. excessana is native to New Zealand. It is distributed throughout the country including on the Chatham Islands and is regarded as being very common. It has also been introduced to Hawaii and is regarded as an invasive species.

== Biology and behaviour ==
P. excessana has several generations per year. The females lay eggs in a flat oval group that contains approximately 50 eggs. The larvae create a silk shelter on the underside of leaves and as they grow construct a structure in which they live by webbing leaves together. When dislodged from their shelter they drop suspended from a silken thread. The larvae pupate in this structure.

Adults are attracted to light and have been collected via a mercury vapour light trap.

== Habitat and host plants ==
The larvae feed on many forest, orchard and garden shrubs and trees. It prefers trees with broad leaves or needles and its hosts include exotic species such as Eucalyptus species, Sequoia sempervirens, Pinus species (including Pinus radiata) and Pseudotsuga menziesii as well as New Zealand endemics such as Dicksonia squarrosa, Metrosideros diffusa and Peraxilla tetrapetala.

== Interactions with humans ==
In New Zealand this species is a major pest of apples, strawberries, stone fruits and walnuts. They feed on leaves, buds, and soft stems under a webbing of silk and foliage. P. excessana also cause scarring damage on fruit such as apples and kiwifruit which can result in the fruit being rejected for export. This species can be controlled by insecticide sprays. P. excessana is also parasitised by Ancistrocerus gazella, a solitary wasp accidentally introduced to New Zealand. It has been proposed that A. gazella be used as a biological control of P. excessana to reduce the impact that the moth has on commercial agricultural crops and also to assist with the reduced use of insecticides.

This species has been intercepted at United States ports on vegetation sourced from New Zealand.
