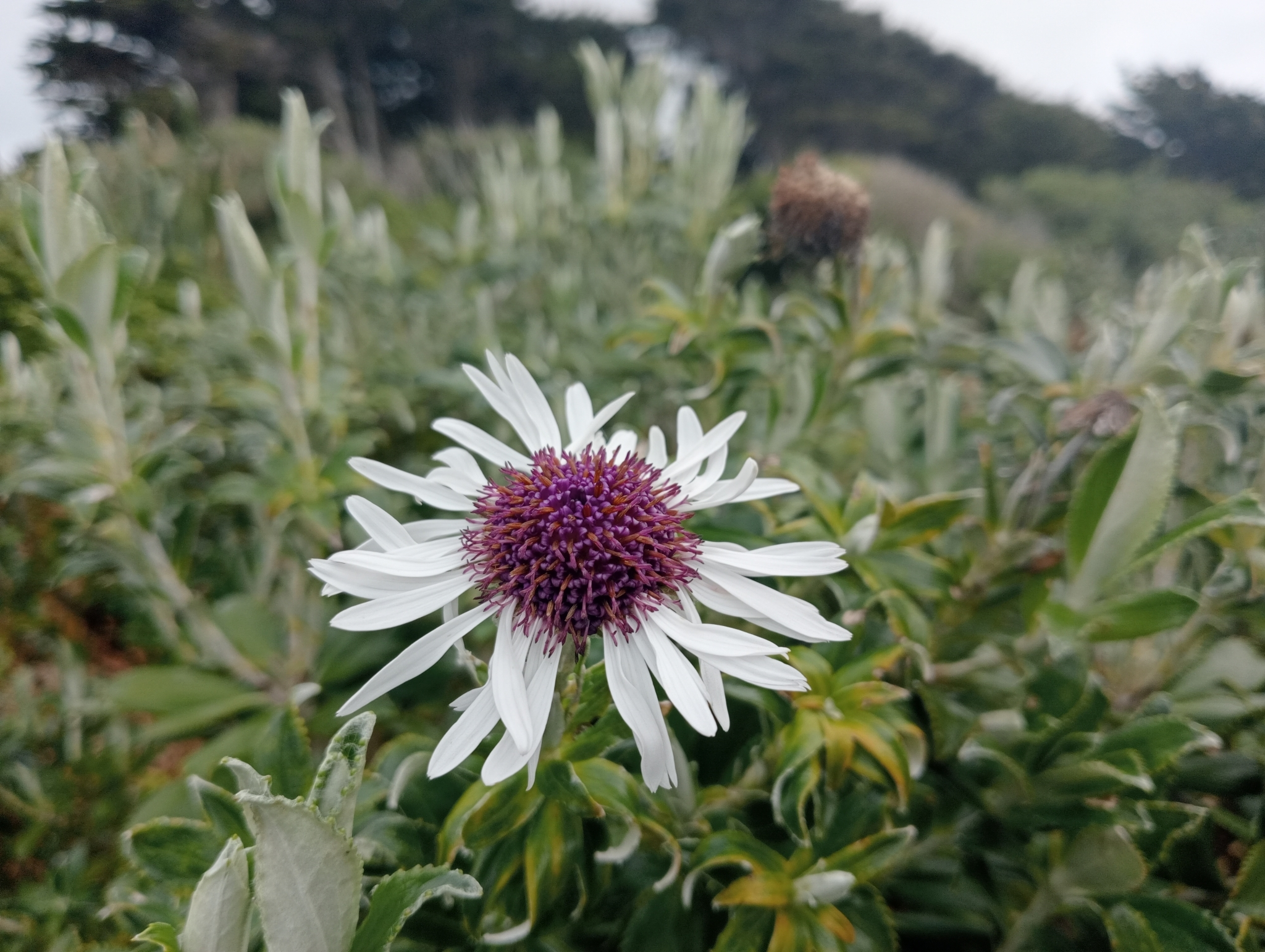
- Macrolearia chathamica

Scientific classification
- Kingdom: Plantae
- Clade: Tracheophytes
- Clade: Angiosperms
- Clade: Eudicots
- Clade: Asterids
- Order: Asterales
- Family: Asteraceae
- Subfamily: Asteroideae
- Tribe: Astereae
- Subtribe: Celmisiinae
- Genus: Macrolearia; Saldivia

= Macrolearia =

Genus of flowering plants

Macrolearia is a genus of flowering plants in the family Asteraceae. It includes six species native to New Zealand.

== Species ==
Six species are accepted.

- Macrolearia angustifolia (Hook.f.) Saldivia
- Macrolearia chathamica (Kirk) Saldivia
- Macrolearia colensoi (Hook.f.) Saldivia
- Macrolearia lyallii (Hook.f.) Saldivia
- Macrolearia oporina (G.Forst.) Saldivia
- Macrolearia semidentata (Decne.) Saldivia
- Macrolearia × traillii (Kirk) Saldivia
