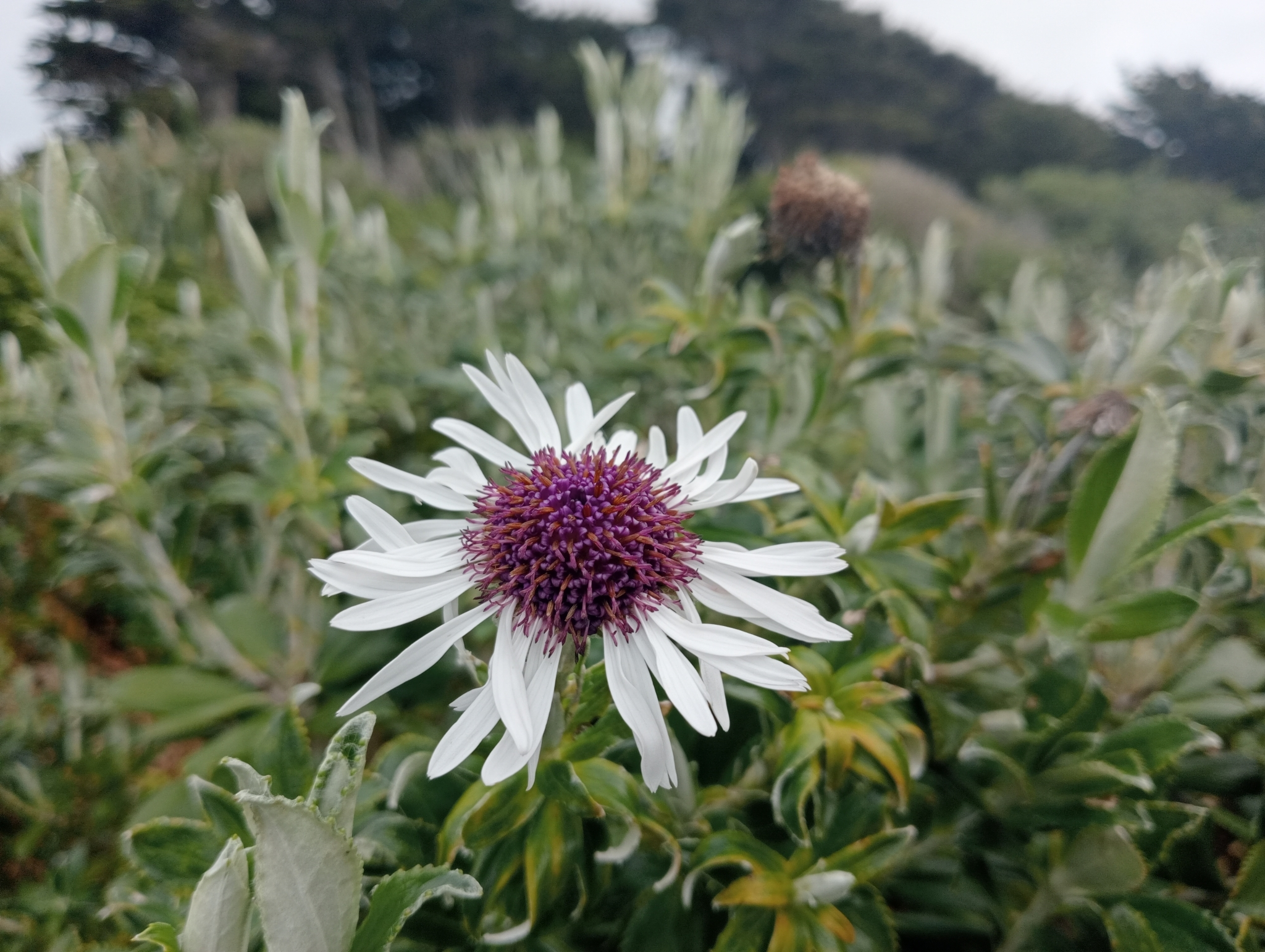

Conservation status
- Near Threatened (IUCN 2.3)

Scientific classification
- Kingdom: Plantae
- Clade: Tracheophytes
- Clade: Angiosperms
- Clade: Eudicots
- Clade: Asterids
- Order: Asterales
- Family: Asteraceae
- Genus: Macrolearia
- Species: M. chathamica

Binomial name
- Macrolearia chathamica (Kirk) Saldivia

Synonyms
- Arnica operina A.Rich.; Olearia chathamica Kirk

= Macrolearia chathamica =

Species of flowering plant

Macrolearia chathamica, commonly known as keketerehe, is a species of flowering plant in the family Asteraceae. It is found only in the Chatham Islands of New Zealand.
