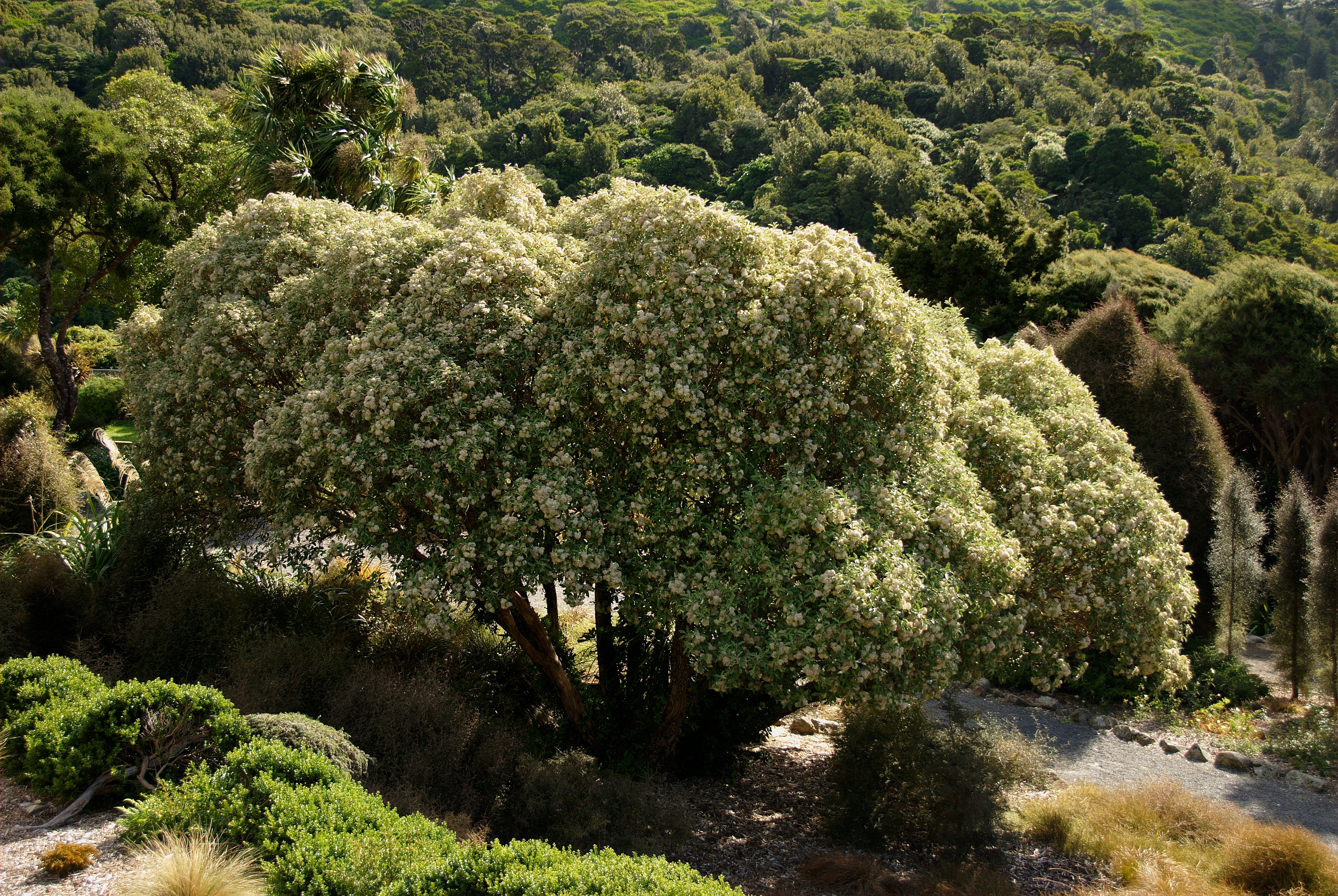

Scientific classification
- Kingdom: Plantae
- Clade: Tracheophytes
- Clade: Angiosperms
- Clade: Eudicots
- Clade: Asterids
- Order: Asterales
- Family: Asteraceae
- Genus: Macrolearia
- Species: M. lyallii

Binomial name
- Macrolearia lyallii (Hook.f.) Saldivia

Synonyms
- Aster lyallii (Hook.f.) Kuntze; Eurybia lyallii Hook.f.; Olearia colensoi var. grandis G.Simpson; Olearia lyallii (Hook.f.) Hook.f.

= Macrolearia lyallii =

Subantarctic tree daisy

Species of tree endemic to New Zealand

Macrolearia lyallii is a New Zealand plant from the genus Olearia. It is commonly known as the subantarctic tree daisy. The species is endemic to the Snares Islands and southern New Zealand, and has also established itself as an introduced species on the Auckland Islands, from where the type specimen was described. O. lyallii forms trees up to 10 metres (33 feet) tall with trunks 50 cm in diameter.
