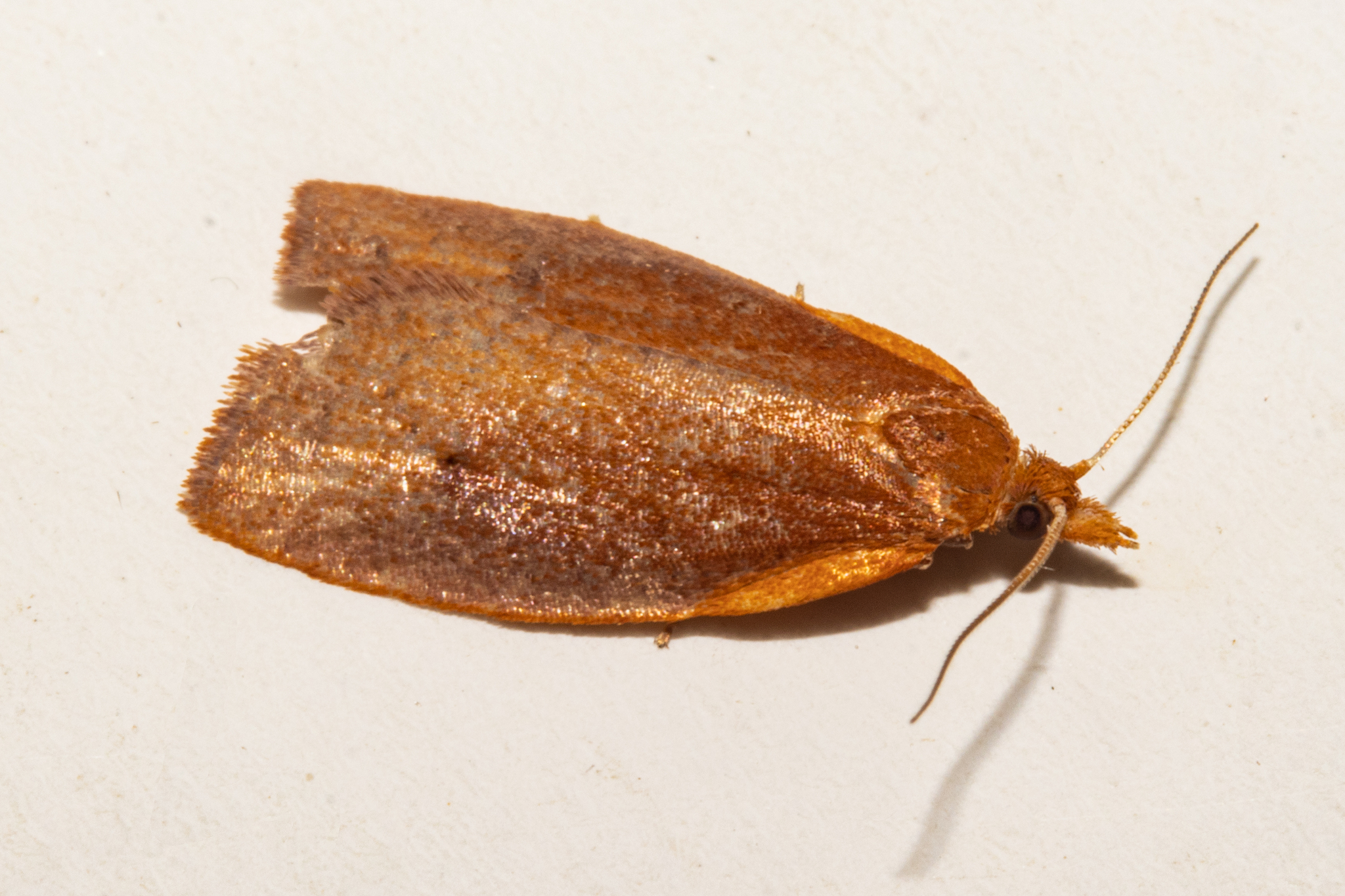

Scientific classification
- Kingdom: Animalia
- Phylum: Arthropoda
- Class: Insecta
- Order: Lepidoptera
- Family: Tortricidae
- Genus: Planotortrix
- Species: P. flammea

Binomial name
- Planotortrix flammea (Salmon, 1956)

Synonyms
- Bactra flammea Salmon, 1956

= Planotortrix flammea =

Species of moth

Planotortrix flammea is a species of moth of the family Tortricidae. It is endemic to New Zealand.

== Taxonomy ==
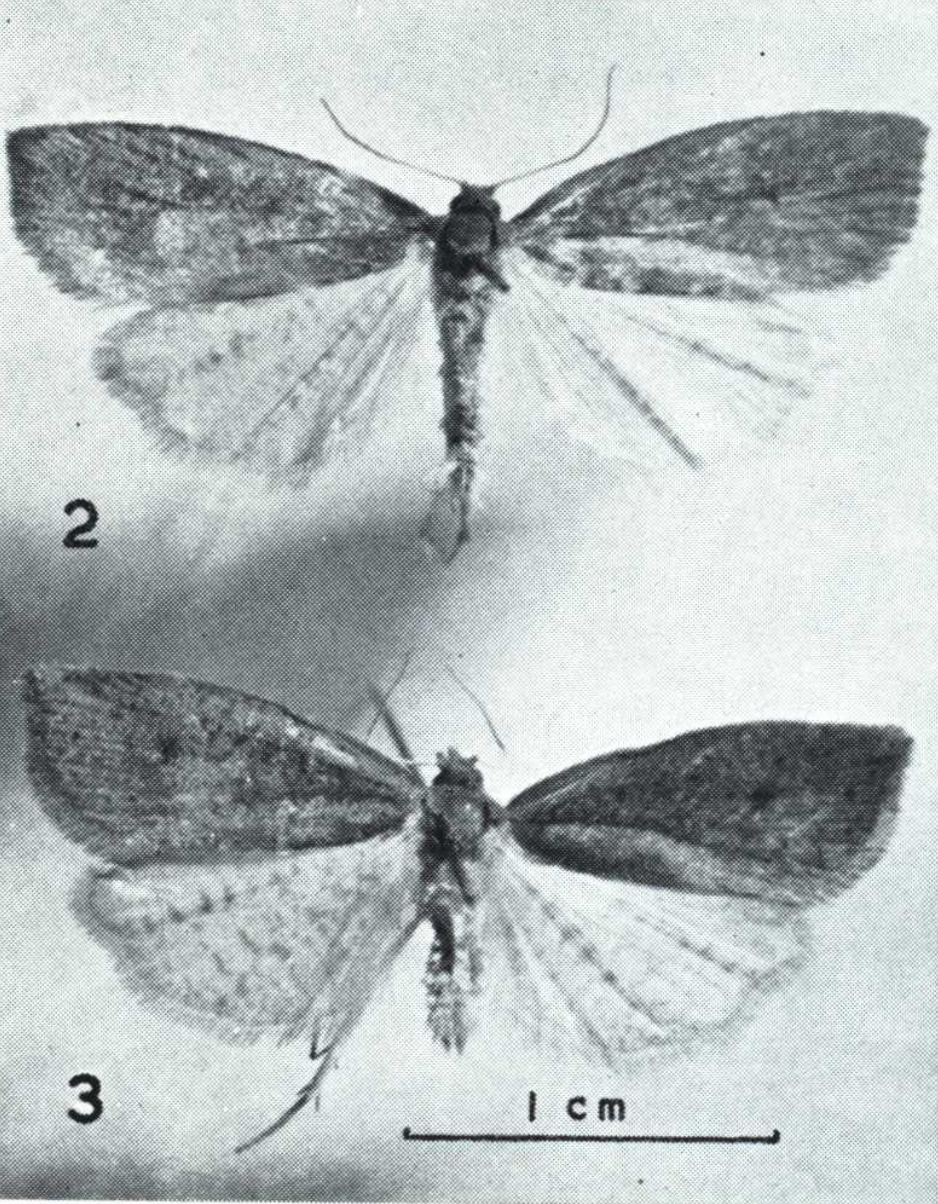
Type specimens

This species was first described in 1956 by John Salmon using a specimen collected by him at Homer Forks Fiordland in mid January. Salmon named the species Bactra flammea. In 1966, John S. Dugdale placed this species with the genus Planotortrix.

== Distribution ==
This species is endemic to New Zealand. It can be found in Gisborne, Taupō, Taranaki, Nelson, Buller, North and Mid Canterbury, Mackenzie country and Fiordland. The species inhabits coastal to alpine habitat.

== Habitat and host species ==
The larvae feed on Veronica odora, Veronica salicifolia, Veronica stricta and Veronica subalpina. Other hosts include Veronica elliptica and Veronica pauciramosa.
