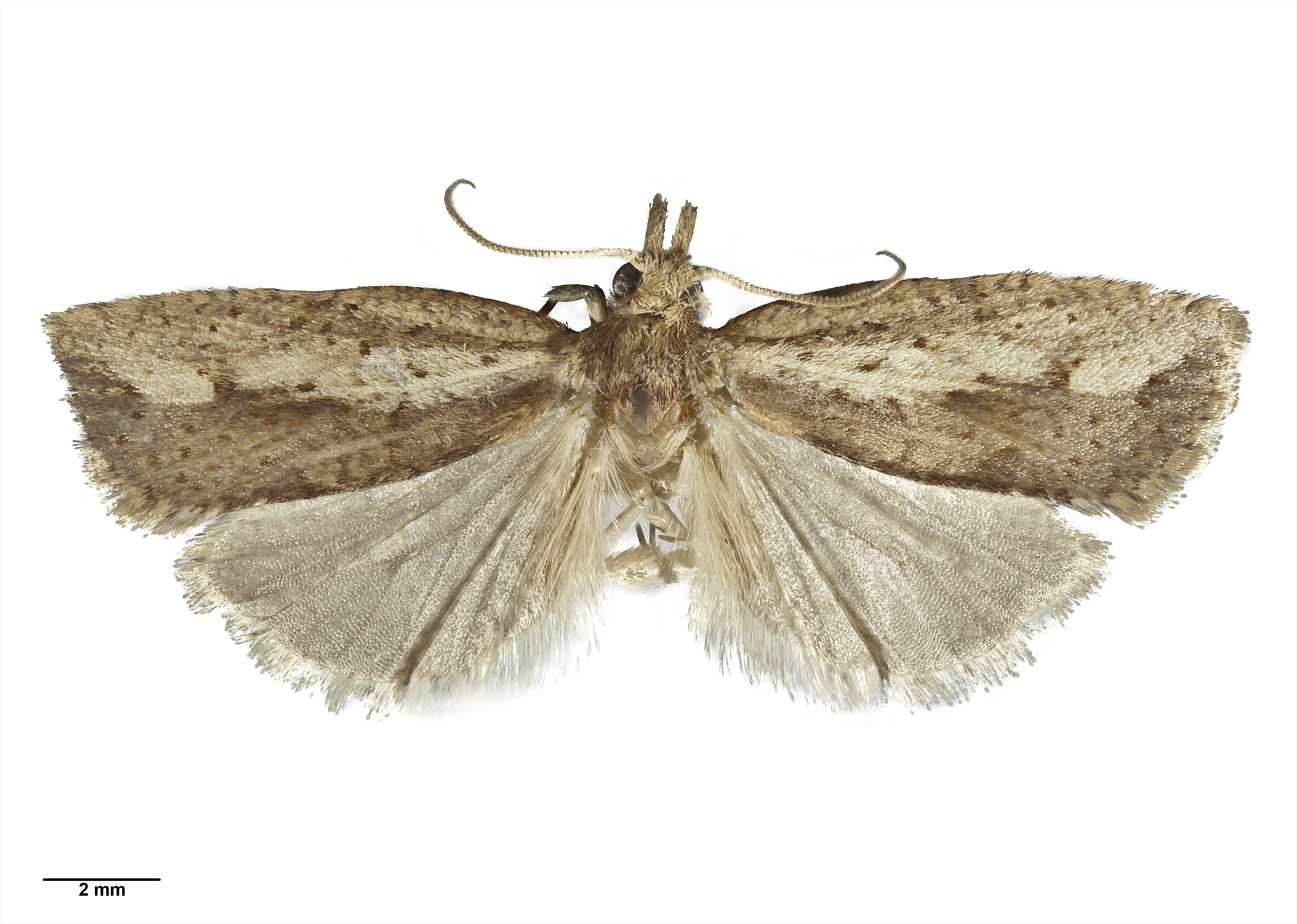
- Male holotype specimen held at the Auckland War Memorial Museum.

Scientific classification
- Kingdom: Animalia
- Phylum: Arthropoda
- Clade: Pancrustacea
- Class: Insecta
- Order: Lepidoptera
- Family: Tortricidae
- Genus: Planotortrix
- Species: P. notophaea

Binomial name
- Planotortrix notophaea (Turner, 1926)

Synonyms
- Tortrix notophaea Turner, 1926; Ctenopseutis obliquana distincta Salmon, 1948

= Planotortrix notophaea =

Species of moth

Planotortrix notophaea, the blacklegged leafroller, is a species of moth in the family Tortricidae. It is endemic to New Zealand. It was also present near Sydney in Australia, but this population is thought to be extinct.

== Taxonomy ==
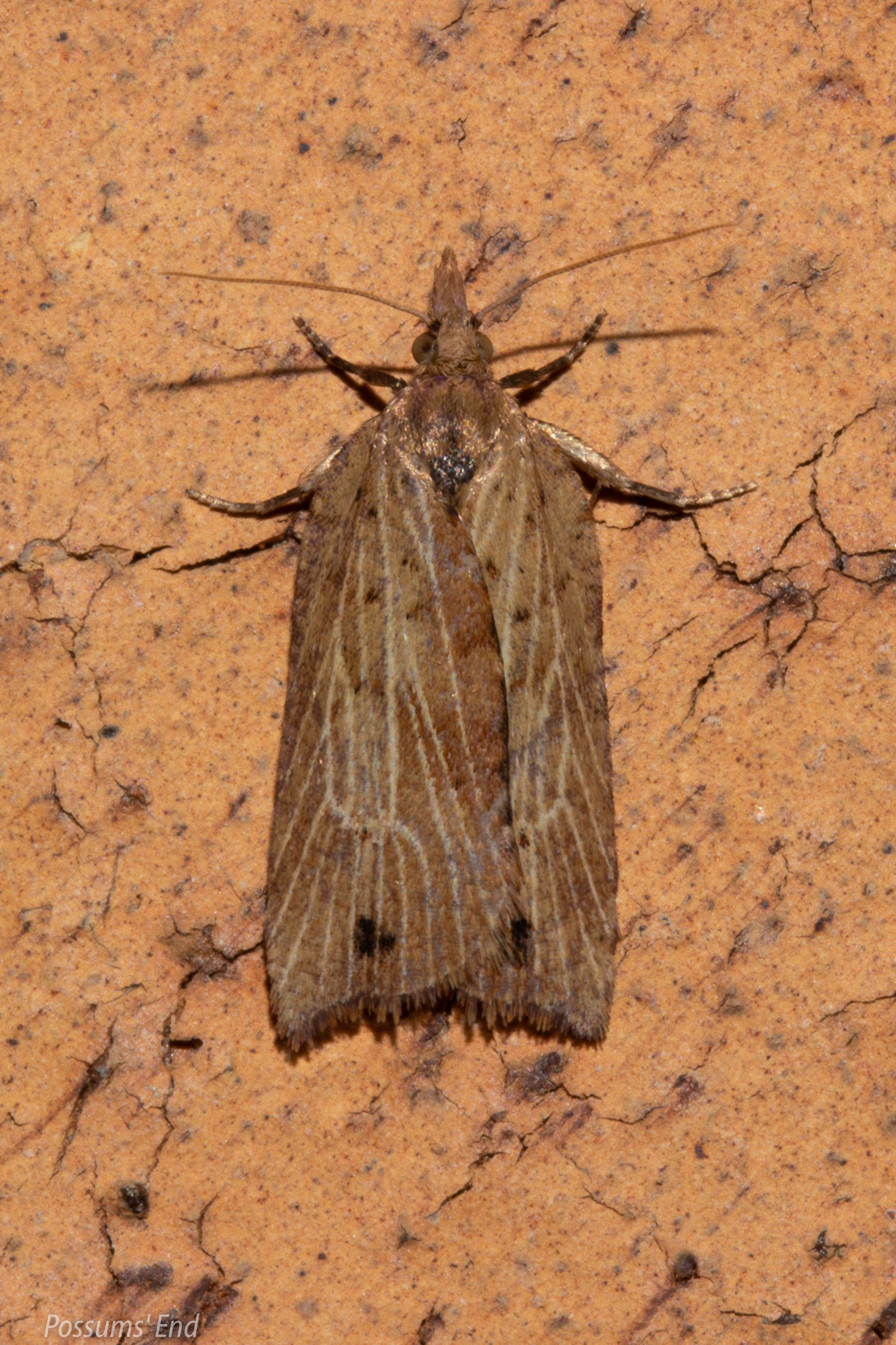
Form of Planotortrix notophaea

This species was first described in 1926 by A. J. Turner and named Tortrix notophaea. Turner used a specimen sent to him by Alfred Philpott that had been reared in New Zealand. It had emerged from a cutting of Acacia decurrans that had been collecting at Epping, Sydney. The holotype specimen used for this description is now held at the New Zealand Arthropod Collection. No other specimens have been collected in Australia and as such that population is thought to be extinct. It has been hypothesised that this specimen resulted from the species becoming established in Epping as a result of a commercial nursery near where it was collected. In 1928 George Hudson illustrated this species under the name Tortrix excessana. In 1946 J. T. Salmon, thinking he was describing a new subspecies, named this moth Ctenopseutis obliquana distincta. The specimen Salmon used for this description was collected by Graham Turbutt on the 23 April 1946 at Great Island and is now held at the Auckland War Memorial Museum. This name was synonymised by John S. Dugdale in 1966 and the species was placed by him within the genus Planotortrix.

== Description ==
The wingspan is 15–18 mm. This species is a brown fuscous colour with antennae that are fuscous white. The abdomen is grey with a lateral black stripe and fuscous coloured legs. There is a diamond-shaped patch in the discal cell of the forewings. This species can be variable in appearance.

The larvae of this species have heads that are green with narrow brown stripes, a green body and white lateral stripes as well as black forelegs.

== Distribution ==
This species is endemic to New Zealand. It is found on the Three Kings Islands, the South Island and the North Island.

== Habitat and host species ==
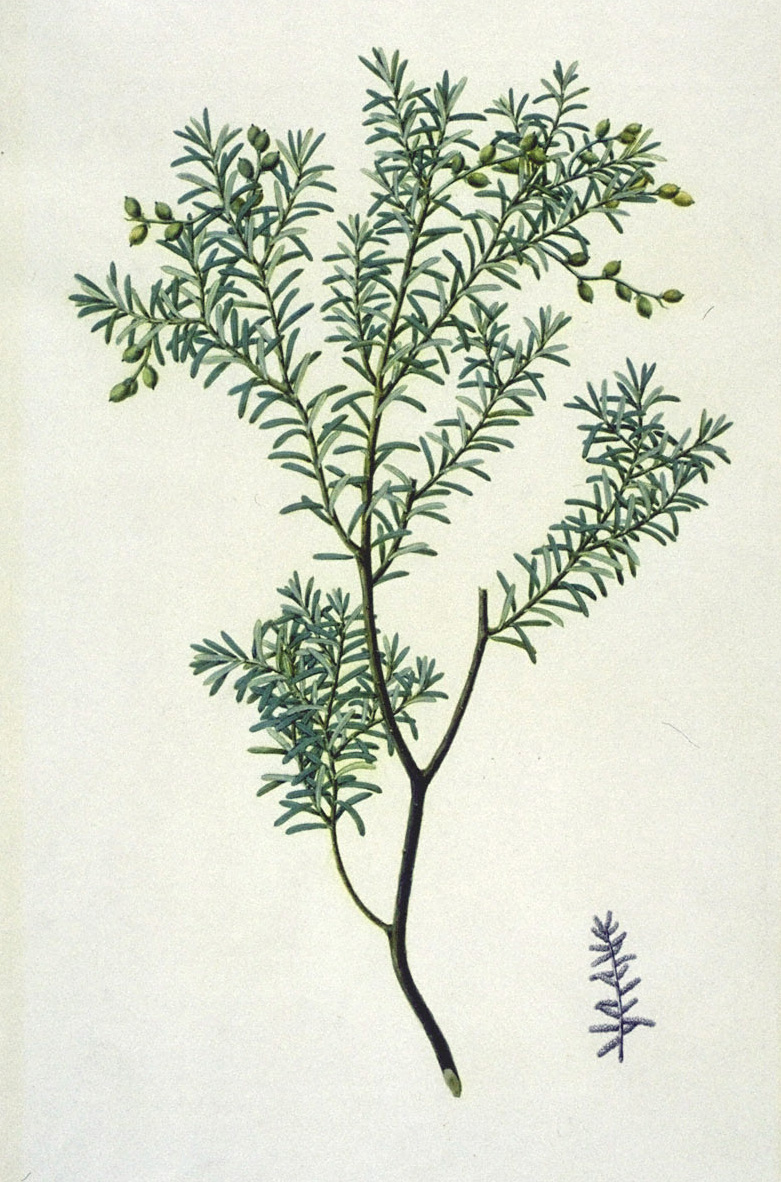
The mataī (Prumnopitys taxifolia), one endemic host species of P. notonphaea.

This species prefers coastal to montane forest habitat. The larvae are polyphagous, but prefer small-leaved, hard-leaved gymnosperms and dicotyledonous angiosperms. Endemic host species include Aristotelia serrata, Coprosma grandifolia, Metrosideros excelsa, and Prumnopitys taxifolia. The larvae feed on leaves, buds and stems from a shelter made of foliage webbed together with silk.

== Behaviour ==
Adults are attracted to light and have been collected via a mercury vapour light trap.

== Human interactions ==
P. notophaea is regarded as being a damaging pest of commercial conifer forests. It is listed as a Quarantine Pest when exporting forest goods from New Zealand to other countries.
