= Planotortrix octoides =

Scientific classification
- Domain: Eukaryota
- Kingdom: Animalia
- Phylum: Arthropoda
- Class: Insecta
- Order: Lepidoptera
- Family: Tortricidae
- Genus: Planotortrix
- Species: P. octoides

Binomial name
- Planotortrix octoides Dugdale, 1990

Species of moth

Planotortrix octoides is a species of moth of the family Tortricidae. It is endemic to New Zealand, where it has been recorded from the Chatham Islands only.

The wingspan is 18–26 mm.
