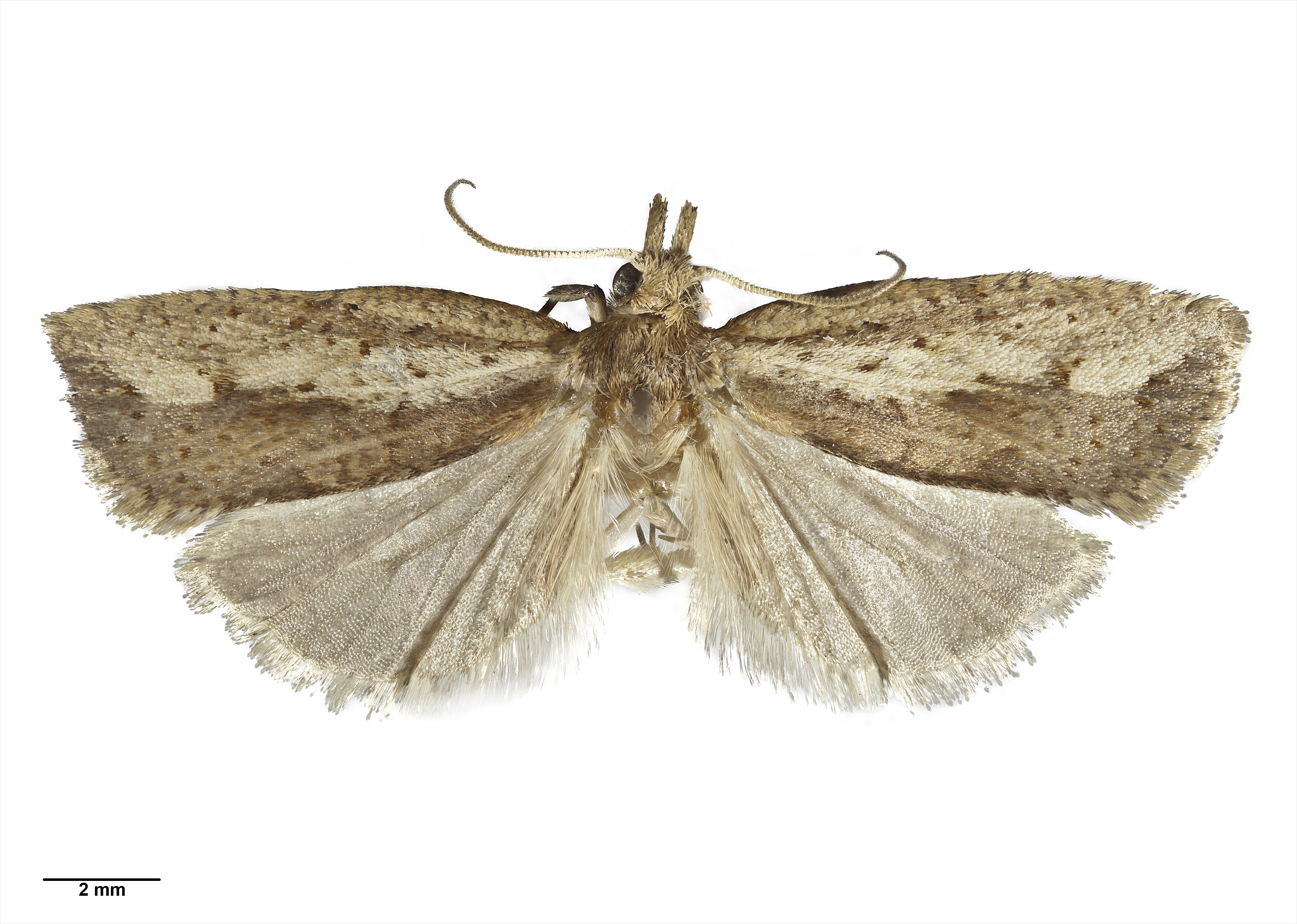
- Planotortrix notophaea

Scientific classification
- Domain: Eukaryota
- Kingdom: Animalia
- Phylum: Arthropoda
- Class: Insecta
- Order: Lepidoptera
- Family: Tortricidae
- Subfamily: Tortricinae
- Tribe: Archipini
- Genus: Planotortrix; Dugdale, 1966

= Planotortrix =

Genus of tortrix moths

Planotortrix is a genus of moths belonging to the subfamily Tortricinae of the family Tortricidae.

== Species ==
- Planotortrix avicenniae Dugdale, 1990
- Planotortrix excessana (Walker, 1863)
- Planotortrix flammea (Salmon, 1956)
- Planotortrix notophaea (Turner, 1926)
- Planotortrix octo Dugdale, 1990
- Planotortrix octoides Dugdale, 1990
- Planotortrix puffini Dugdale, 1990

== See also ==
- List of Tortricidae genera
