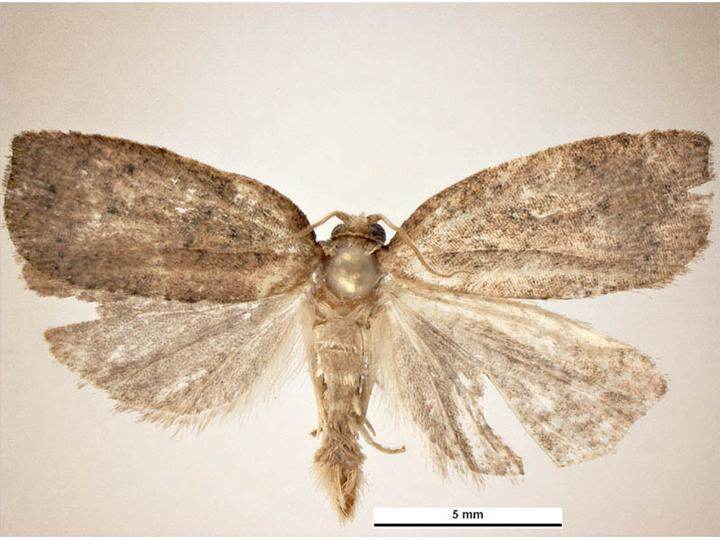
- Male, dorsal view
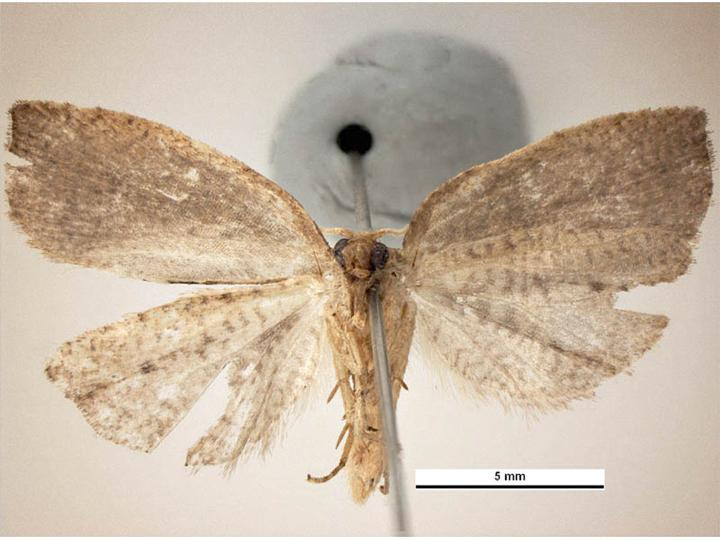
- Male, ventral view

Scientific classification
- Kingdom: Animalia
- Phylum: Arthropoda
- Clade: Pancrustacea
- Class: Insecta
- Order: Lepidoptera
- Family: Tortricidae
- Genus: Planotortrix
- Species: P. octo

Binomial name
- Planotortrix octo Dugdale, 1990

= Planotortrix octo =

Species of moth

Planotortrix octo is a moth of the family Tortricidae. It is endemic to New Zealand, where it is found in both the North and South islands.

The larvae feed on Ribes, Chaenomeles, Cotoneaster, Crataegus, Cydonia, Eriobotrya, Fragaria, Kerria, Malus, Photinia, Prunus, Pyracantha, Rosa, Rhaphiolepis, Rubus, Boronia, Choysia, Citrus and Phebalium species. It is considered to be a pest species.
