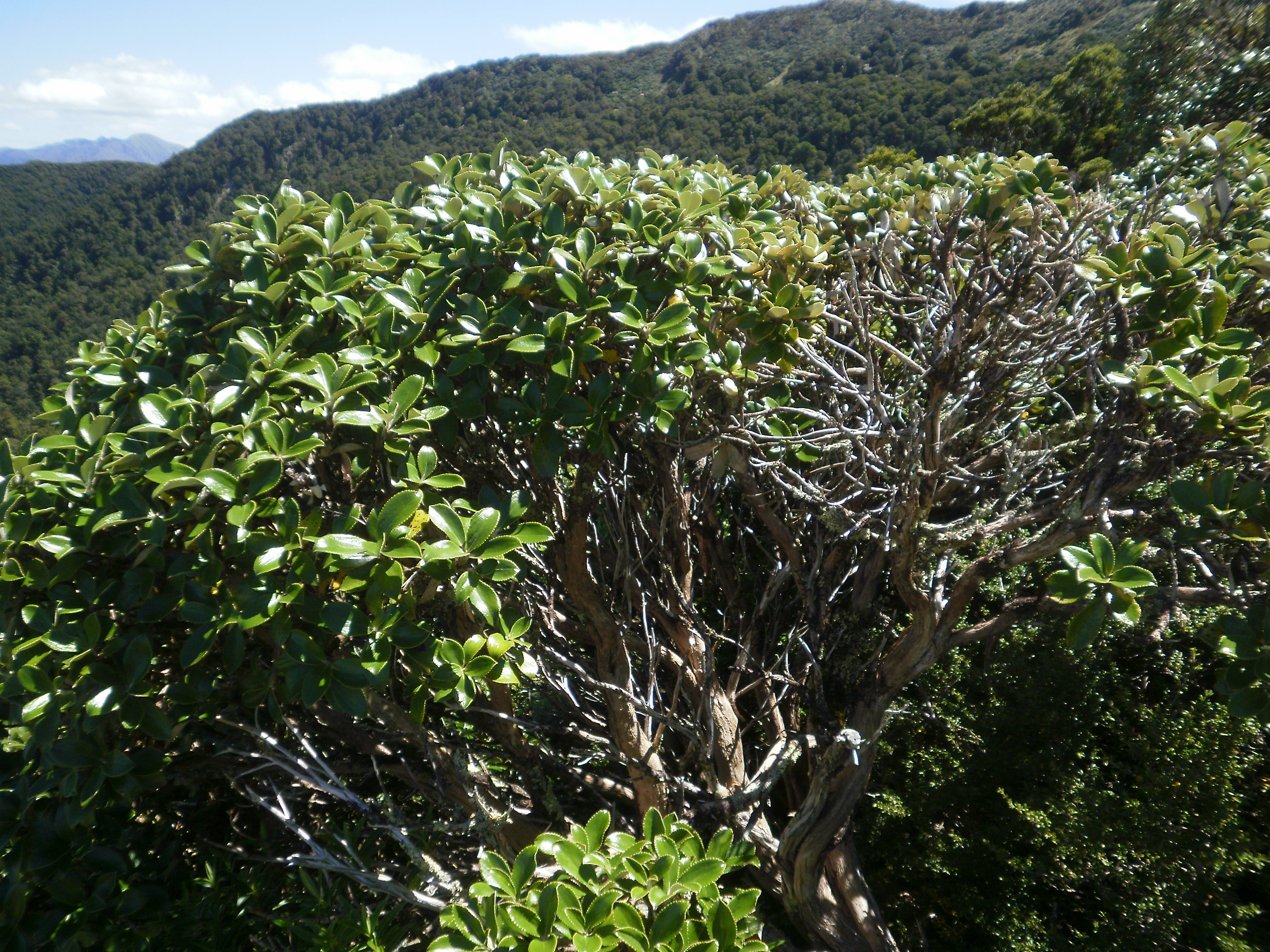

Scientific classification
- Kingdom: Plantae
- Clade: Tracheophytes
- Clade: Angiosperms
- Clade: Eudicots
- Clade: Asterids
- Order: Asterales
- Family: Asteraceae
- Genus: Macrolearia
- Species: M. colensoi

Binomial name
- Macrolearia colensoi (Hook.f.) Saldivia

Synonyms
- Olearia colensoi Hook.f.

= Macrolearia colensoi =

Species of shrub endemic to New Zealand

Macrolearia colensoi, commonly known as tūpare (from the Māori tūpare) or leatherwood, is a sub-alpine species of shrub that is endemic to New Zealand. Other names it is known by in Māori are kūmarahou and kūmararaunui.

== Description ==
M. colensoi is a tough rigid shrub that can grow into a tree 5 metres (16 feet) high. It has thick, serrated leaves 8–20 cm (3.1–7.9 in) long and 3–6 cm (1.2–2.4 in) wide. The leaves are grey-green in colour with a white or buff underside covered in dense hairs. The bark is light brown and papery with branches covered in woolly hairs. The flowers are typically dark red or yellow.

== Distribution ==
M. colensoi is endemic to New Zealand. It is common in sub-alpine scrub, and is found in the eastern and southern ranges of the North Island, western parts of the South Island, Stewart Island and some outlying islands. It grows down to sea level in the far south of New Zealand.
