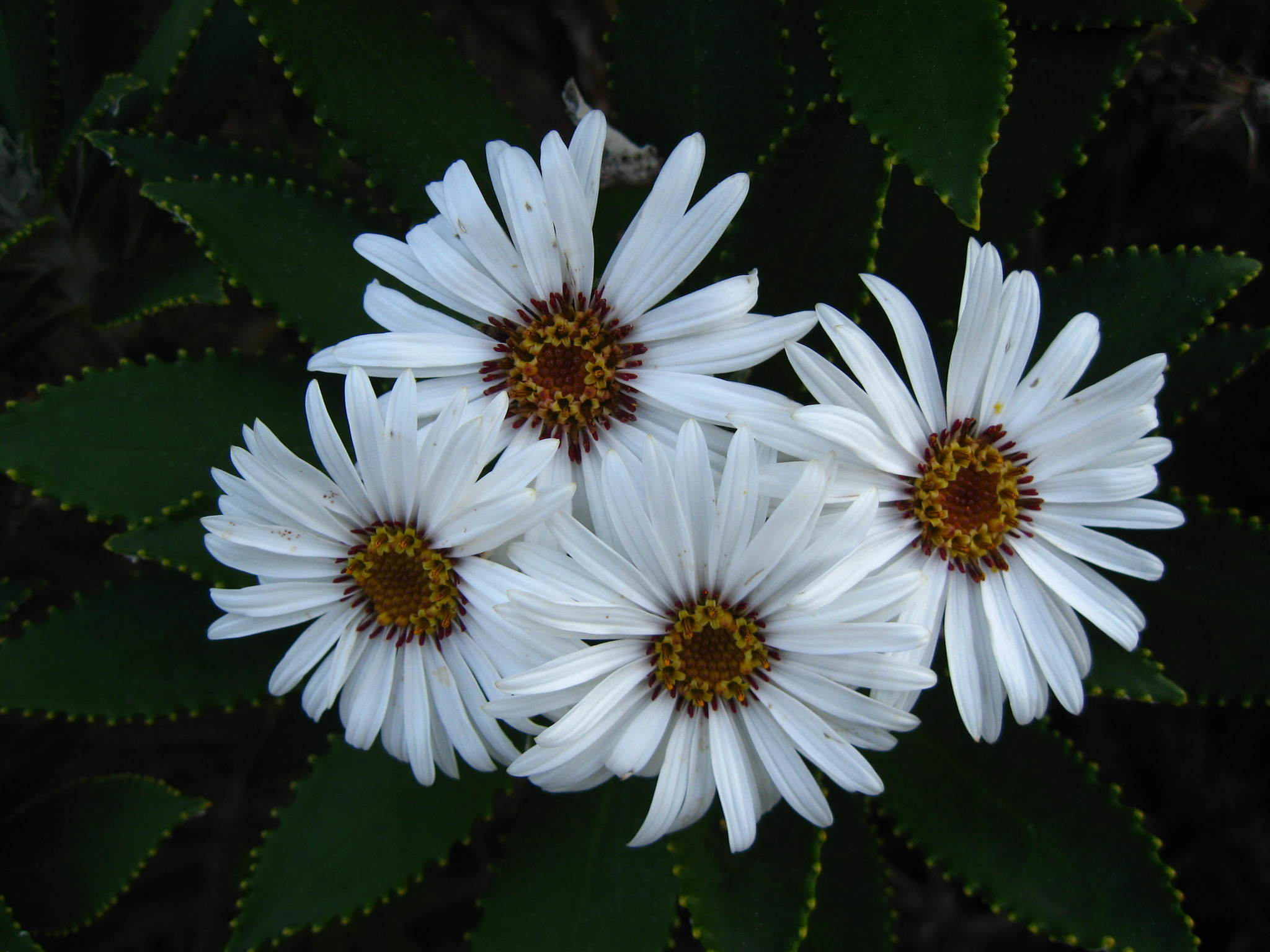

Conservation status
- Naturally Uncommon (NZ TCS)

Scientific classification
- Kingdom: Plantae
- Clade: Tracheophytes
- Clade: Angiosperms
- Clade: Eudicots
- Clade: Asterids
- Order: Asterales
- Family: Asteraceae
- Genus: Macrolearia
- Species: M. oporina

Binomial name
- Macrolearia oporina (G.Forst.) Saldivia

Synonyms
- Arnica oporina G.Forst. (1786); Olearia oporina (G.Forst.) Hook.f.

= Macrolearia oporina =

Species of flowering plant

Macrolearia oporina is a species of small tree in the family Asteraceae. It is endemic to the south-western South Island of New Zealand, including some outlying islands (e.g., Stewart Island). It grows in coastal scrub or forest, often on peaty ground.
