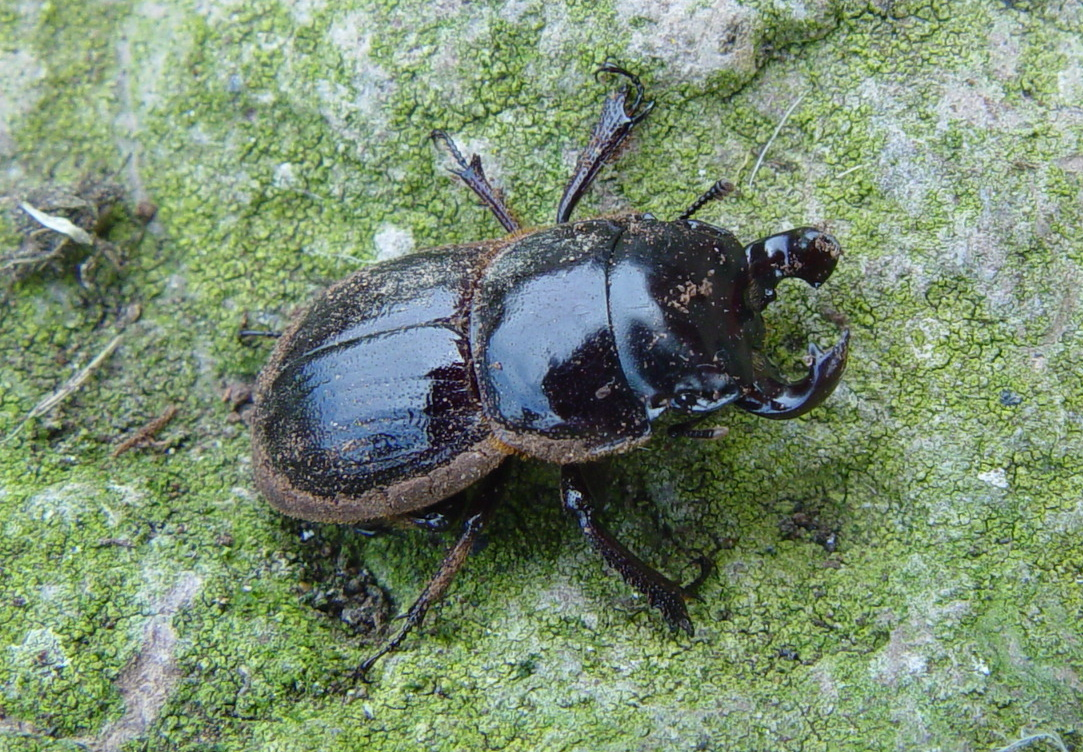
- Illustration by Des Helmore

Conservation status
- Nationally Critical (NZ TCS)

Scientific classification
- Kingdom: Animalia
- Phylum: Arthropoda
- Class: Insecta
- Order: Coleoptera
- Suborder: Polyphaga
- Infraorder: Scarabaeiformia
- Family: Lucanidae
- Genus: Geodorcus
- Species: G. sororum

Binomial name
- Geodorcus sororum (Holloway, 2007)

= Geodorcus sororum =

Species of beetle

Geodorcus sororum is a large flightless species of stag beetle in the family Lucanidae. It was discovered in 1973 by Mr. A. Wright on an expedition to Middle Sister Island/Te Awanui, one of The Sisters Islands/Rangitatahi which are part of the Chatham Islands in New Zealand. This holotype specimen is held in the New Zealand Arthropod Collection. It is considered one of the rarest and most valuable species of Lucanidae. It was first described by Beverley Holloway in 2007. The name sororum is translated from Latin to mean "belonging to the sisters".

== Description and taxonomy ==
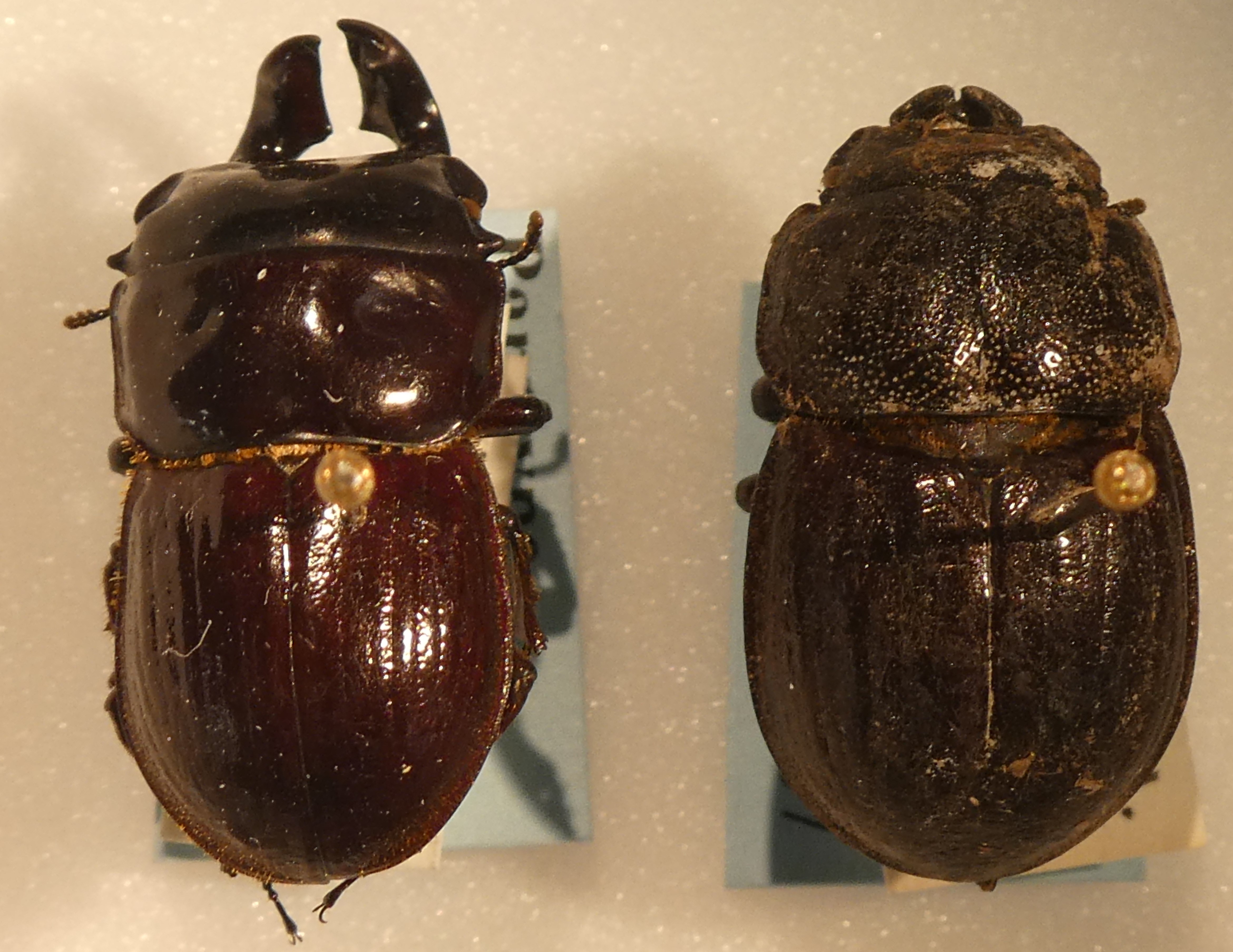
Male (left) and female (right) pinned specimens, showing sexual dimorphism.

This beetle ranges in length (including mandibles) from 18.0 to 28.5 mm (males) and from 19.4 to 24 mm (females). It has a glossy exoskeleton which ranges in colour from reddish-black to black. Like Geodorcus servandus, its elytra are not distinctly ribbed. This is a feature that distinguishes G. sororum from G. capito which is also found in the Chatham Islands. They demonstrate sexual dimorphism with an overall size difference and obvious differences in mandible shape and size. The two species of Geodorcus beetle on the Chatham Islands share a common ancestor. Mitochondrial DNA analysis shows that G. capito and G. sororum are more closely related than either is to the other Geodorcus species found on mainland New Zealand. Individuals of G. sororum are very closely related to each other and have low genetic diversity.

== Distribution ==
This species has only been observed on Middle Sister Island, which is located 19 km north-west of Chatham Island. Collections of the beetle have been made from near sea level to 40 m. This island is a breeding ground for large seabirds including northern royal albatross and Buller's albatross.

== Habitat ==
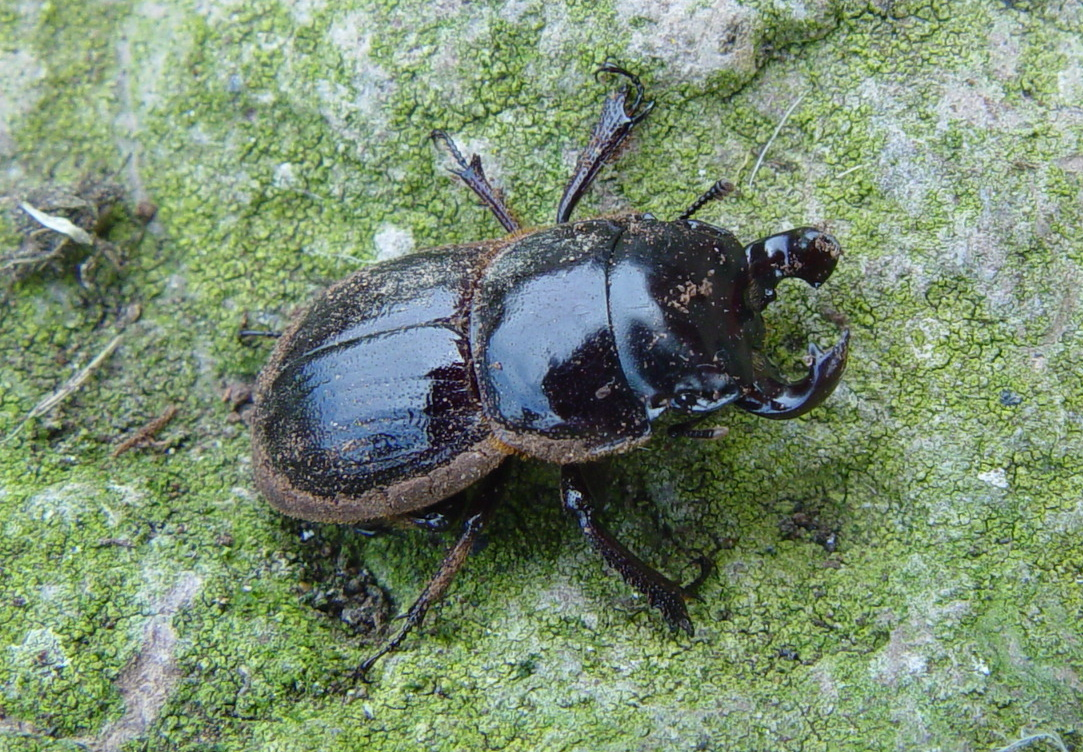
Geodorcus sororum observed on via iNaturalist.

Middle Sister Island has sparse vegetation consisting mainly of coastal herbs and ice plant. Other Geodorcus species are associated with rotten logs, but this habitat is absent from the treeless Sisters Islands, which are two pyramidical rocks about 100 feet high, covered with scanty bushes, and frequented by countless numbers of sea-birds.

== Diet ==
Geodorcus beetle larvae tend to feed on decaying wood or the fungi involved in decomposition. Geodorcus sororum larvae must consume an alternative, as the plant communities on Middle Sister Island consist only of small shrubs and herbs. The adult beetles must also consume an alternative food source to the other members of this genus, considering the absence of woody vegetation on this small island. The presence of a humus-rich soil should allow this species to complete its life cycle.

== Conservation ==
Like all Geodorcus species, G. sororum is absolutely protected under Schedule 7 of The 1953 Wildlife Act, making it an offense to collect or harm a specimen. It has a conservation status as nationally critical due to its small population on Middle Sister Island and presence in only one location. The Sisters Islands are currently rodent free. They are visited by birdwatchers and the introduction of rodents would be catastrophic for this species.
