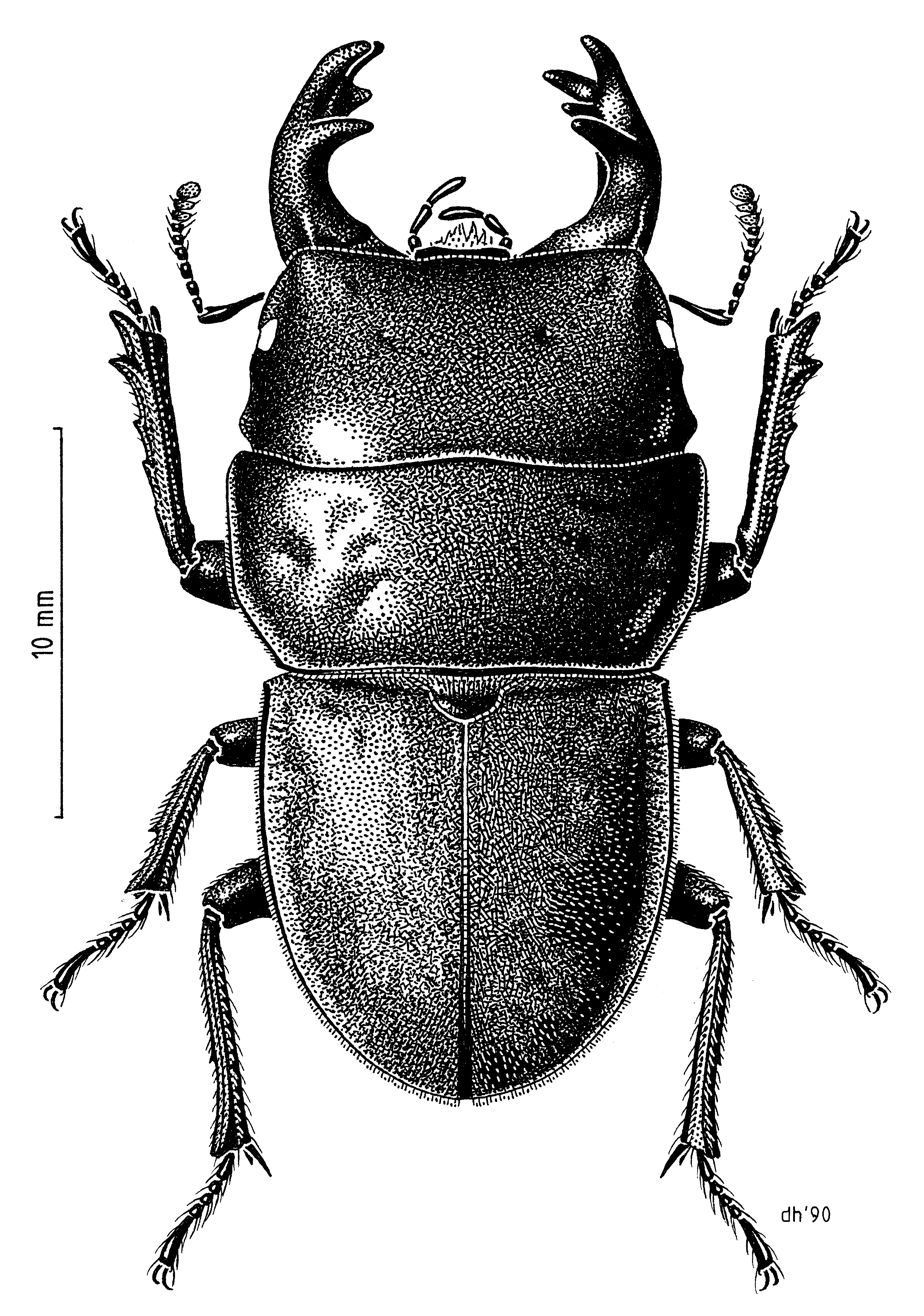
- Illustration by Des Helmore

Conservation status
- Nationally Critical (NZ TCS)

Scientific classification
- Kingdom: Animalia
- Phylum: Arthropoda
- Clade: Pancrustacea
- Class: Insecta
- Order: Coleoptera
- Suborder: Polyphaga
- Infraorder: Scarabaeiformia
- Family: Lucanidae
- Genus: Geodorcus
- Species: G. ithaginis

Binomial name
- Geodorcus ithaginis (Broun, 1893)
- Distribution (in green) of the Mokohinau stag beetle

Synonyms
- Lissotes ithaginis Broun, 1893

= Geodorcus ithaginis =

Species of beetle

Geodorcus ithaginis, the Mokohinau stag beetle, is a large flightless species of stag beetle in the family Lucanidae. It was described by Thomas Broun in 1893 after being discovered in the Mokohinau Islands by Andreas Stewart Sandager, a lighthouse keeper on the islands. The species survives only on the small unnamed island "Stack H", in a patch of vegetation the size of a living room, and is in extreme danger of extinction.

== Description ==
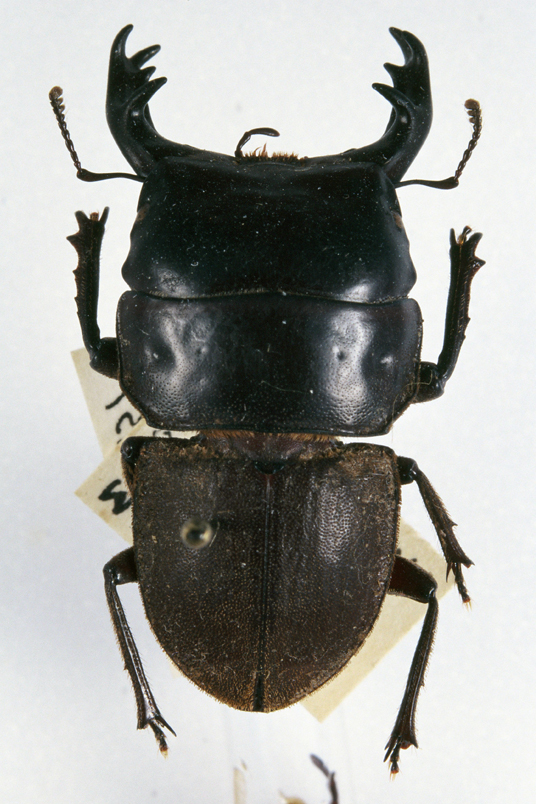
Pinned male specimen

Including their large mandibles (used for fighting over mates), male specimens range in length from 25.5 to 32.8 mm and are 10.4–12.4 mm wide. Females range in length from 20.0–22.5 mm. Their exoskeleton is black and ranges from dull to moderately glossy. The thorax is back, glossy, and wider than it is long. The elytra are rounded at the posterior, almost equally long and wide, and covered in short branching hairs. Male beetles have three teeth at the apex of the mandibles; females have two. What distinguishes this species from all other New Zealand stag beetles is a long conical vertical tooth, on the top of the mandible, in both sexes.

== Distribution ==
This species is only known from the Mokohinau Islands in New Zealand. It was one of 130 beetle species collected on the Mokohinaus by lighthouse keeper Andreas Stewart Sandager (stationed on Burgess Island 1883–1889); a third of these species turned out to be new to science, and were described by Thomas Broun. (Note: Andreas Fleming Stewart Sandager's name takes various forms in the literature – Andreas Fremming Stewart Sandager, F. S. Sandager, F. Sandager, P. Sandager, and even P. Stewart-Sandager – sometimes appearing two different ways in the same publication. Sandager's wrasse (Coris sandeyeri) takes its species name from another variant of his surname, Sandeyer.) The stag beetle's type locality was given by Broun as "Halodroma Islet", but there is no island by that name. "Halodroma" may be another name for Lizard Island, a small flat island southeast of Burgess Island; Halodroma urinatrix is the former name of Pelacanoides urinatrix, the diving petrel, which used to nest in burrows on Lizard and two other low Mokohinau islands.

A few more specimens were collected in 1902, and then none until the species was rediscovered in 1984 on "Stack H", a 1.2 ha island southwest of Burgess Island. All recent surveys have only found this species on Stack H, in a "living-room sized" patch of New Zealand ice plant or horokaka (Disphyma australe); it has not been seen on Lizard Island since its description in 1893.

== Habitat ==
Geodorcus species on mainland New Zealand are associated with rotten logs, but these are absent from Stack H. The Mokohinau Islands are generally very arid, with poor moisture retention. This beetle burrows into a peat-like layer of soil formed by New Zealand ice plant (Disphyma australe). It has also been found under rocks, in the tussock grass Chionochloa bromoides, and in the leaf litter beneath coastal pōhutukawa.

== Diet ==
These beetles are nocturnal, and their feeding behaviour is unknown. Adult stag beetles worldwide have mouthparts suited to feeding on liquids. Geodorcus helmsi has been seen feeding on sappy exudations on tree trunks. Rotting wood, tree roots or humus are the most common food sources for stag beetle larvae, and G. ithaginis lives in an environment of enriched humus.

== Conservation ==
Searches specifically for G. ithaginis from 1991 to 1994 in the Mokohinau group of islands only found three live beetles on Stack H; nine beetles is the maximum simultaneously observed in recent times. The Mokohinau Islands have been heavily modified by land clearance, burning, grazing, and introduction of the kiore or Polynesian rat; Lizard Island was briefly colonised by kiore in the late 1970s. Rats were eradicated from all the Mokohinau Islands in the 1990s, but subsequent surveys for G. ithaginis on Lizard Island have been unsuccessful. Fire, storms, and rodent introductions are thought to be the most serious threats to this species' survival. Climate change, resulting in a drying out of the island habitat, may also be a threat. The conservation status of this species is categorised as 'nationally critical'. Like other Geodorcus species, this large, slow-moving beetle is protected from collectors under schedule 7 of the 1953 Wildlife Act.

Captive breeding and reintroduction to rat-free islands such as Lizard Island was the Department of Conservation plan for ensuring this species' survival. An expedition in January 2019 thoroughly searched the beetle's habitat on Stack H, another nearby stack, and Lizard Island, and found nothing but fragments of exoskeleton of indeterminate age, and concluded G. ithaginis may possibly be extinct.
