= Geodorcus montivagus =

Conservation status
- Data Deficit (NZ TCS)

Scientific classification
- Kingdom: Animalia
- Phylum: Arthropoda
- Clade: Pancrustacea
- Class: Insecta
- Order: Coleoptera
- Suborder: Polyphaga
- Infraorder: Scarabaeiformia
- Family: Lucanidae
- Genus: Geodorcus
- Species: G. montivagus

Binomial name
- Geodorcus montivagus Holloway, 2007

Species of beetle

Geodorcus montivagus is a large flightless species of stag beetle endemic to New Zealand.

== Taxonomy ==
This species was described in 2007 by Beverly Holloway.

== Description ==
The specimen found has a body length, including its mandibles of 21.1mm. It has a black and glossy exoskeleton. The mandibles are short, arched and toothed.

== Distribution ==
This species is known from only one female specimen found on the Victoria Range in New Zealand. It was found in tussock at 1,220 metres (4,000 ft) above sea level.

== Conservation status ==
This species has been classified as "Data Deficient" with the qualifier of "One Location" under the New Zealand Threat Classification System.
