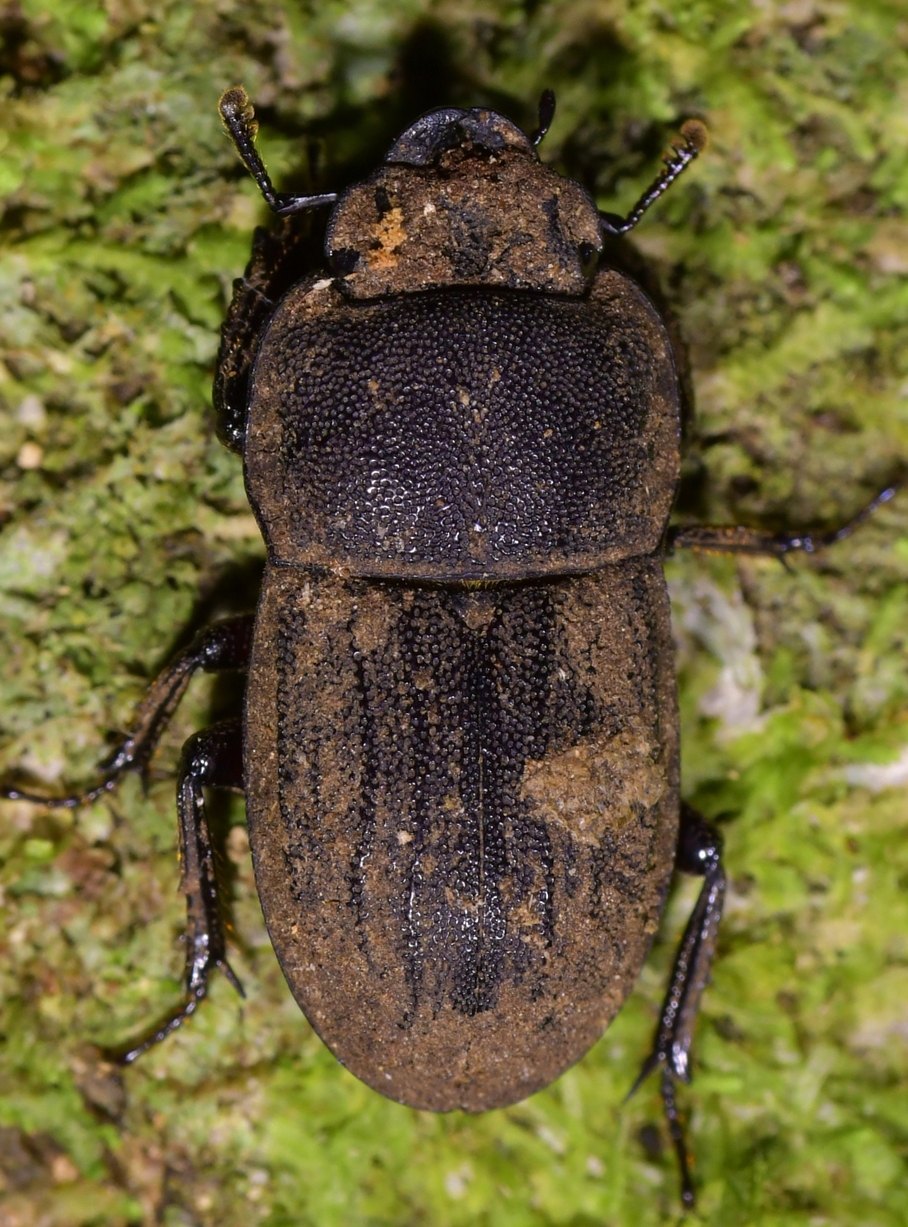
- Female
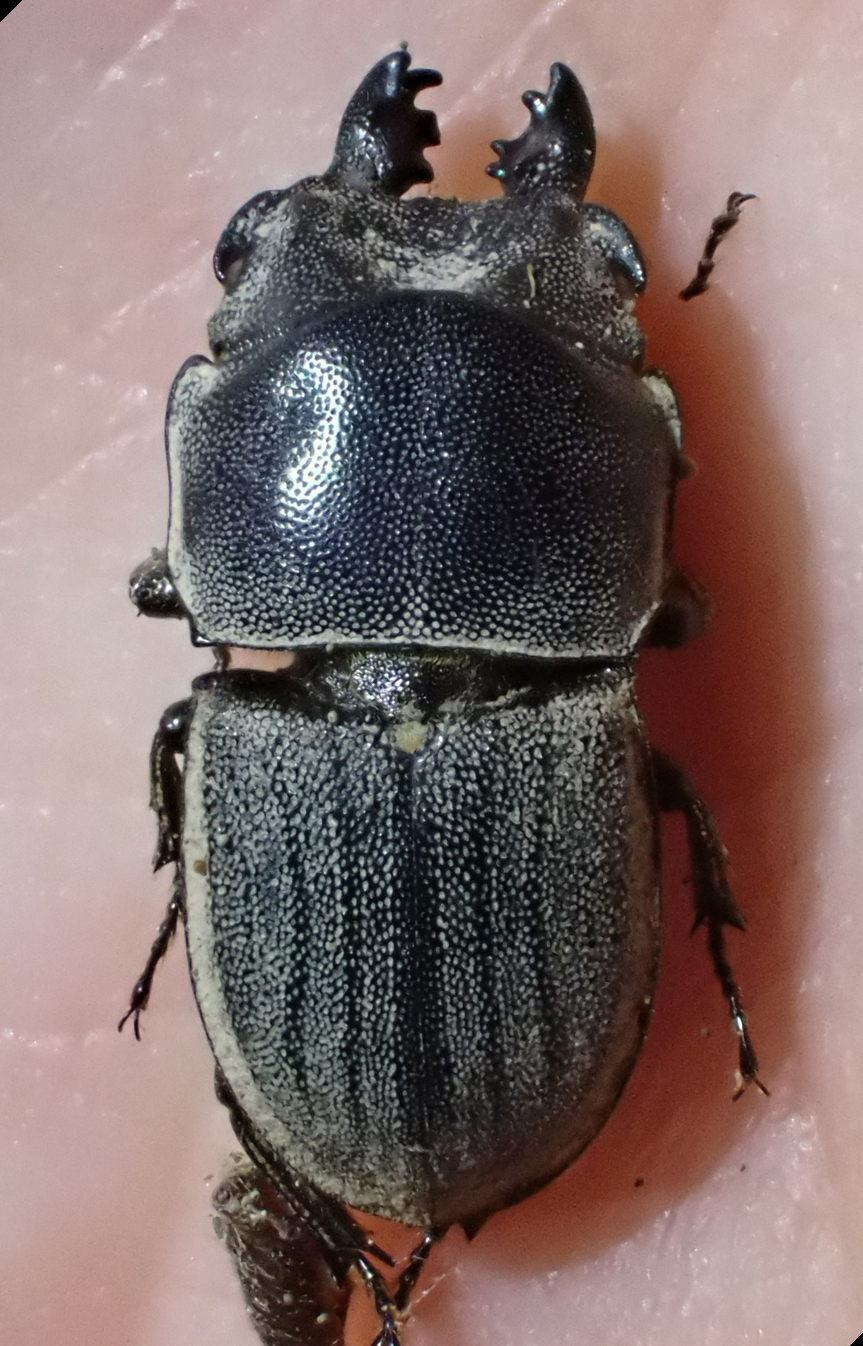
- Male

Conservation status
- Naturally Uncommon (NZ TCS)

Scientific classification
- Kingdom: Animalia
- Phylum: Arthropoda
- Clade: Pancrustacea
- Class: Insecta
- Order: Coleoptera
- Suborder: Polyphaga
- Infraorder: Scarabaeiformia
- Family: Lucanidae
- Genus: Geodorcus
- Species: G. novaezealandiae

Binomial name
- Geodorcus novaezealandiae (Hope, 1845)

Synonyms
- List: Lucanus novaezealandiae Hope, 1845; Lissotes abditus Broun, 1881; Lissotes novaezealandiae (Hope, 1845); Dorcus abditus Broun, 1881; Dorcus novazealandiae (Hope, 1845); Dorcus punctulatus White, 1846; Sclerostomus caviceps Westwood, 1855

= Geodorcus novaezealandiae =

Species of beetle

Geodorcus novaezealandiae is a large species of stag beetle only found in the Wellington region of New Zealand. It was first described in 1845 by English entomologist Frederick William Hope. It is the smallest member of the genus Geodorcus, all of which are legally protected species. The species displays sexual dimorphism, with the male having distinctly larger and bulkier mandibles than the female. It is often found living under rimu (Dacrydium cupressinum) and southern beech (Nothofagus) trees. Like other Geodorcus species, the larva feeds on rotting wood whereas the adult is presumed to feed on plant sap. It has been speculated that both the male and female work together to create tunnels inside rotting wood to lay eggs in. Under the New Zealand Threat Classification System it is listed as "Naturally Uncommon" with the qualifier of "Range Restricted".

== Taxonomy ==
G. novaezealandiae was first described in 1845 as Lucanus novaezealandiae by English entomologist Frederick William Hope. The species was described again as Dorcus punctulatus in 1846 by Adam White, then as Sclerostomus caviceps by John Westwood and then once more in 1881 as Dorcus abditus by Thomas Broun. Of these, S. caviceps and D. punctulatus were recognised to be L. novaezealandiae in 1868 whereas D. abditus was recognised as L. novaezealandiae in 1961. The species has undergone numerous descriptions and been shifted between genera a few times, but was most recently revised in 2007 by New Zealand entomologist Beverly Holloway, who placed it in the genus Geodorcus, of which it is the type species. Four lectotypes (specimens chosen to serve as the type specimen when the original describer did not assign one) have been designated for this species and are in the Hope Department Collection at Oxford University and in the Natural History Museum of London.

== Description ==
Including their mandibles, the male is 12–21.5 mm in length whereas the female is 11–17.4 mm, which makes them the smallest species of Geodorcus. Like all other Geodorcus, they show sexual dimorphism: the male has a much wider head and larger mandibles whereas the female mandibles are relatively short and are less apparent. In the male, the front of the pronotum (the upper part of the thorax) bulges forwards and slightly hangs over the head whereas in female the pronotum is normal. The body is dull to slightly glossy black, with the upper surface being covered in small punctures. The elytra (hardened plates that cover the abdomen) have a series of slightly raised ribs running down their surface towards the tip of the elytra. The frons and vertex, which make up the front parts of the head, have a distinct depression.

== Distribution and habitat ==
G. novaezealandiae is only found in New Zealand, where it is found in the south of the North Island. Its range extends from the Akatarawa Valley in the Tararua Range in the north of the region to the Aorangi Range in the south. It has been observed at altitudes from near sea level to 365 m. It has been observed under the bark of live rimu (Dacrydium cupressinum) and southern beech (Nothofagus) trees. It's also been found in old beech stumps and amongst roots. Like other Geodorcus species, it is forest-dwelling and nocturnal. Specimens have also been collected in traps 1.5 m above the ground on māhoe (Melicytus ramiflorus) and hinau (Elaeocarpus dentatus) trees. In one study, pitfall traps were able to collect adults in winter, spring and summer whereas a revision of the species had specimens collected from July to April.

== Ecology and behaviour ==
As adults, it is presumed to feed on plant sap from the trees they hide in. It has been reported feeding on speargrass (Aciphylla) and on pieces of apple (when held in captivity). Like other Geodorcus species, the larvae feed on rotting wood. It has been speculated that both sexes work together to create tunnels in rotting wood to lay eggs in, with the male's large mandibles being well suited for the task. While copulating, the male and female face opposite directions with the tips of their abdomen touching.

== Conservation status ==
All Geodorcus species are protected under Schedule 7 of the 1953 Wildlife Act, making it an offense to possess, harm or sell these beetles. Under the New Zealand Threat Classification System, it has a conservation status of "Naturally Uncommon" with the qualifier of "Range Restricted".
