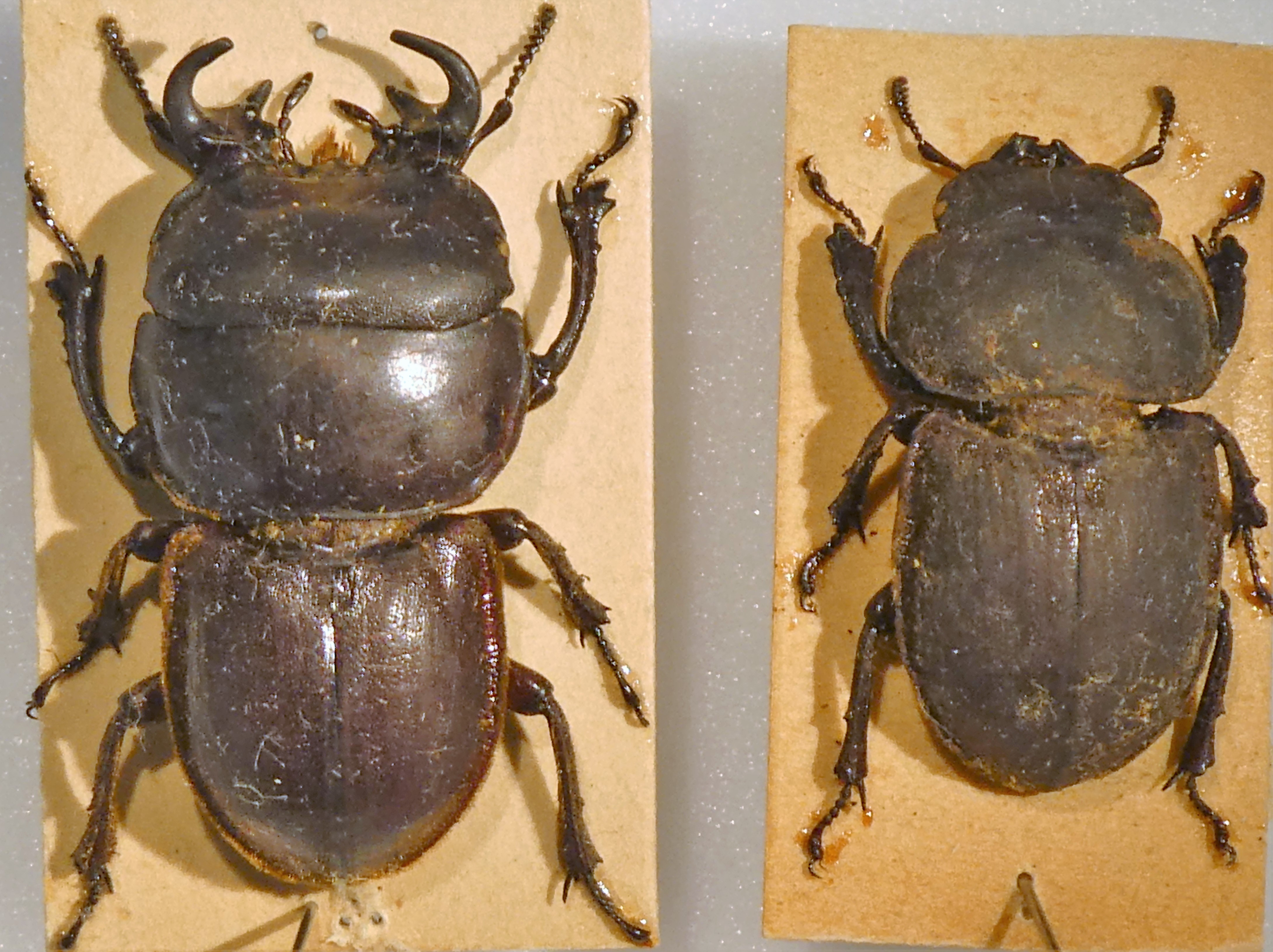

Conservation status
- Nationally Critical (NZ TCS)

Scientific classification
- Domain: Eukaryota
- Kingdom: Animalia
- Phylum: Arthropoda
- Class: Insecta
- Order: Coleoptera
- Suborder: Polyphaga
- Infraorder: Scarabaeiformia
- Family: Lucanidae
- Genus: Geodorcus
- Species: G. servandus

Binomial name
- Geodorcus servandus (Holloway, 2007)

= Geodorcus servandus =

Species of beetle

Geodorcus servandus is a large flightless species of stag beetle in the family Lucanidae. It was discovered by P.R. Kettle in December 1960 and this holotype specimen is held in the New Zealand Arthropod Collection. It was first described by Beverley Holloway in 2007. Its type location is Mount Tuhua summit, near Lake Kaniere on the West Coast of New Zealand. The name servandus is a Latin word meaning "[something] to be preserved, conserved, looked after".

== Description ==
This large Geodorcus ranges in length (including mandibles) from 24 to 35 millimetres (0.9 to 1.4 in) (males) and from 21.3 to 31 millimetres (0.8 to 1.2 in) (females). Despite being larger than many other Geodorcus species, the mandibles are relatively short. They demonstrate sexual dimorphism with an overall size difference and obvious differences in mandible shape and size. Male and female specimens also differ in the depth of small punctures on the dorsal surface; males being shallow and females deep. In both, the pitted surface is conspicuous. The exoskeleton ranges from dull to glossy black. The ribs on the elytra are less conspicuous in this Geodorcus. Vestigial wings are present underneath the elytra. This species resembles Geodorcus montivagus most closely.

== Distribution and habitat ==
This species has only been found in one location, on Mount Tuhua at 1,122 metres (3,681 ft) above sea level. It was found underneath Celmisia daisies on the summit. In 1984 the summit was visited specifically to search for G. servandus and only a small patch of Celmisia was present. On searching this area, only a specimen of the closely related G. helmsi was found.

== History of discovery ==
This distinctive stag beetle was described from specimens originally collected in December 1960 by Dr. P.R. Kettle during surveys primarily undertaken for terrestrial molluscs on Mount Tuhua's summit. However it was not until 2007 that formal publication of this new species of Geodorcus was made. The author of the species, Dr Beverley Holloway, had by then long-retired from her position as an entomologist at DSIR, and the Dominion Museum before that. She continued her studies as a hobby, finally publishing a major work on the Lucanidae of New Zealand, in which seven new endemic species of stag beetle were then described, including, G. servandus. Referring to it as a "spectacular stag beetle", Dr Holloway expressed reluctance at having to reveal the type locality on Mount Tuhua in its formal scientific description for fear that both its population and its habitat might be destroyed by "overzealous New Zealand entomologists and foreign collectors". The name servandus in Latin means "preserve, look after, conserve" and refers to the author's concern to see action taken to ensure its survival.

== Conservation ==
Like other Geodorcus species, G. servandus is absolutely protected under Schedule 7 of The 1953 Wildlife Act, making it an offense to collect or harm a specimen. Its status as nationally critical is due to its rarity after significant searches and presence in only one location. If this species was specifically searched for in the future, care would need to be taken to avoid damaging the small area of fragile habitat in its type location. Pitfall trapping could be a less harmful method of surveying for this species, if individuals were released soon after collection.
