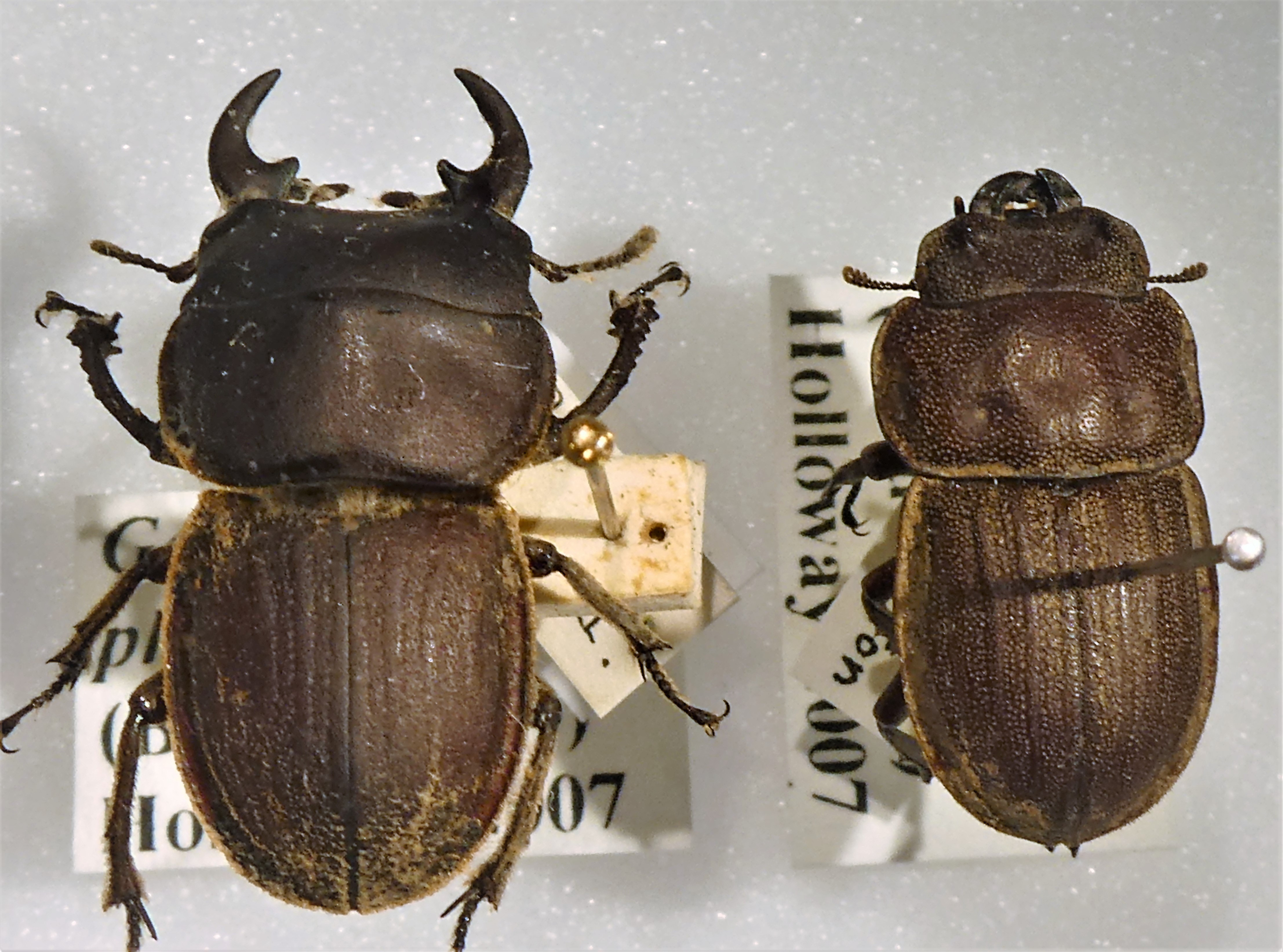

Scientific classification
- Kingdom: Animalia
- Phylum: Arthropoda
- Clade: Pancrustacea
- Class: Insecta
- Order: Coleoptera
- Suborder: Polyphaga
- Infraorder: Scarabaeiformia
- Family: Lucanidae
- Genus: Geodorcus
- Species: G. philpotti

Binomial name
- Geodorcus philpotti (Broun, 1914)

Synonyms
- Lissotes philpotti Broun, 1914

= Geodorcus philpotti =

Species of beetle

Geodorcus philpotti is a large flightless species of stag beetle in the family Lucanidae. It was named by Major Thomas Broun after Mr A. Philpott, who discovered it at Hump Ridge near Invercargill. It is endemic to New Zealand.

== Description ==
Including their large mandibles, male specimens range in length from 20.5 to 29 mm. Females range in length from 17.0 to 23.6 mm. They have a dull to slightly glossy exoskeleton. Their elytra have obvious ridges.

== Distribution ==
This beetle is found in the south-west of the South Island from the coast adjoining the Hump Ridge Track in the south to 1400m above sea level in the regions' mountains. Its northernmost record is from the Grebe River, near Lake Manapouri.

== Habitat ==
This species has been observed under Astelia plants and on vegetation at night.
