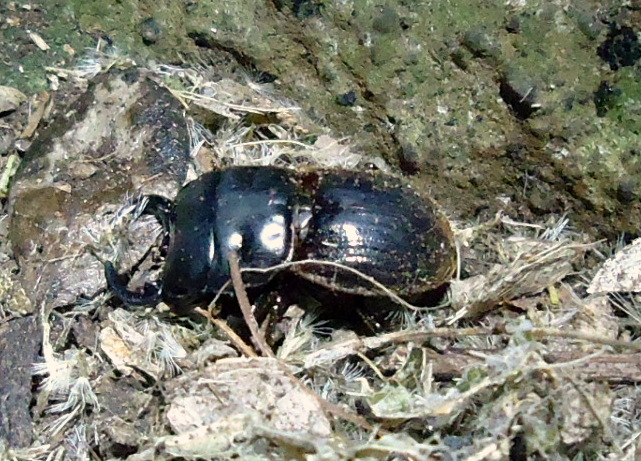

Conservation status
- Nationally Vulnerable (NZ TCS)

Scientific classification
- Kingdom: Animalia
- Phylum: Arthropoda
- Clade: Pancrustacea
- Class: Insecta
- Order: Coleoptera
- Suborder: Polyphaga
- Infraorder: Scarabaeiformia
- Family: Lucanidae
- Genus: Geodorcus
- Species: G. capito

Binomial name
- Geodorcus capito (H.C.Deyrolle, 1873)

Synonyms
- Dorcus capito; Lissotes capito Deyrolle, 1873; Lissotes dispar Broun 1910

= Geodorcus capito =

Species of beetle

Geodorcus capito is a large flightless species of stag beetle in the family Lucanidae. It is endemic to the Chatham Islands in New Zealand.

== Description ==
The exoskeleton of Geodorcus capito varies in colour from glossy black to brownish black. Adults show distinct sexual dimorphism. Including mandibles, male beetles range in length from 17.0–27.0 mm; females from 15.0–19.5 mm. Male and female beetles can be distinguished by the distinct ribbed elytra with obvious branching setae on the male beetle, whilst a female beetle has more vague ribbed elytra and barely visible setae.

== Distribution ==
This stag beetle is found throughout the Chatham Islands, including on Chatham Island, Pitt Island, Rangatira, Mangere Island and Little Mangere Island. It is now thought to be restricted to the southern end of Chatham Island and is less common on Pitt Island than previously. It is possible that vulnerable species like G. capito have been restricted in their distribution by grazing and habitat loss on Chatham Island and pig rooting on Pitt Island.

== Habitat ==
All Geodorcus are nocturnal forest species. Adult G. capito beetles have been seen at night on the ground and on trees. During the day, beetles can be seen hiding under rotten branches and inside debris on tree trunks. All life cycle stages, including eggs, have been seen in moss covered cavities of trees on Chatham Island. On smaller islands adults have been collected under rocks in coastal forest.

== Diet ==
From their mouthparts, it is assumed that all adult stag beetles are liquid feeders. Adult Geodorcus beetles feed on sappy exudations from trees. Stag beetle larvae consume rotting wood at or above ground but a few species live underground and feed on either roots or humus.

== Conservation ==
Like other Geodorcus species, G. capito is protected under Schedule 7 of The 1953 Wildlife Act, making it an offense to collect or harm a specimen. The Chatham Island stag beetle has suffered a large reduction in its range on the inhabited Chatham Islands.
