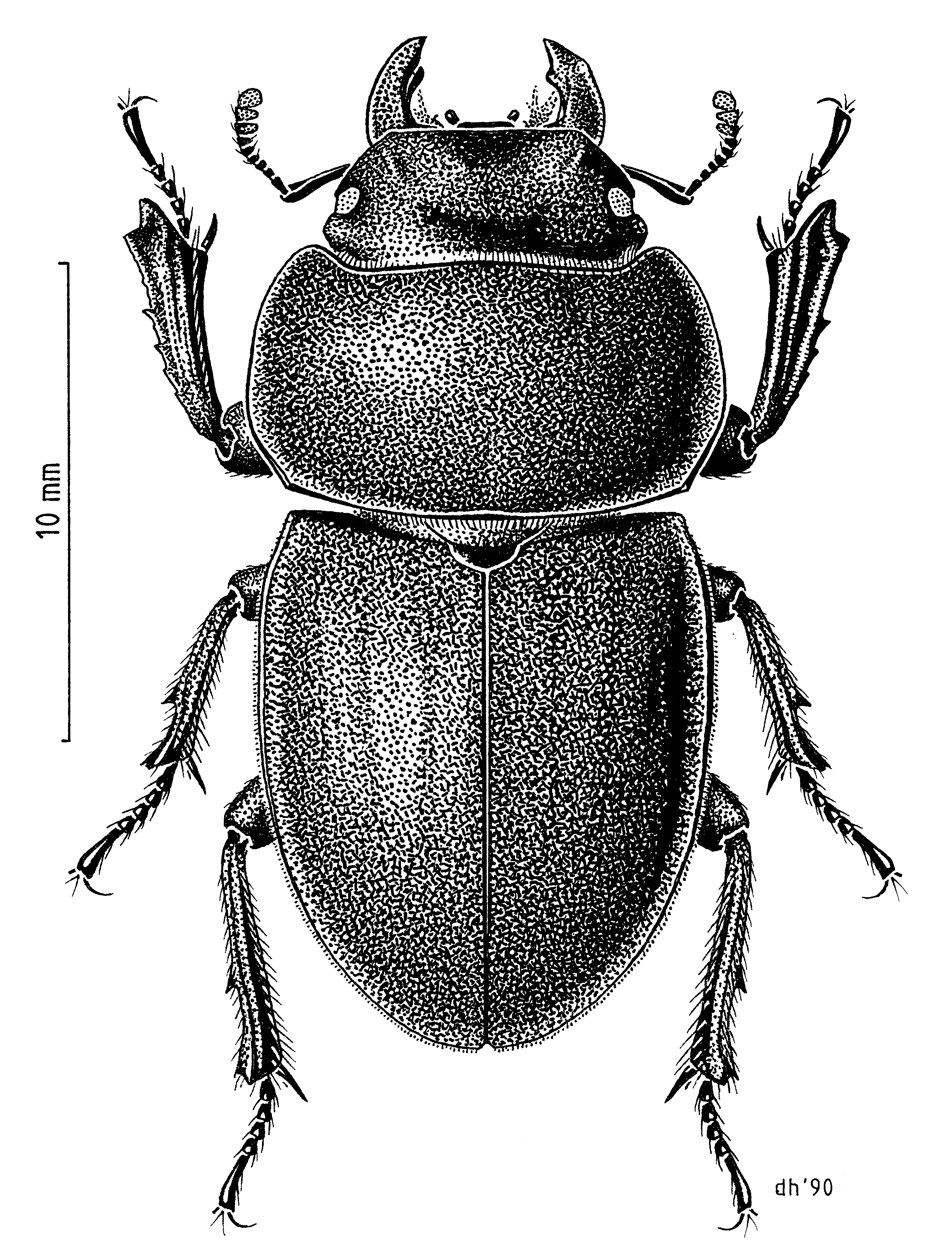
- Female, illustrated by Des Helmore
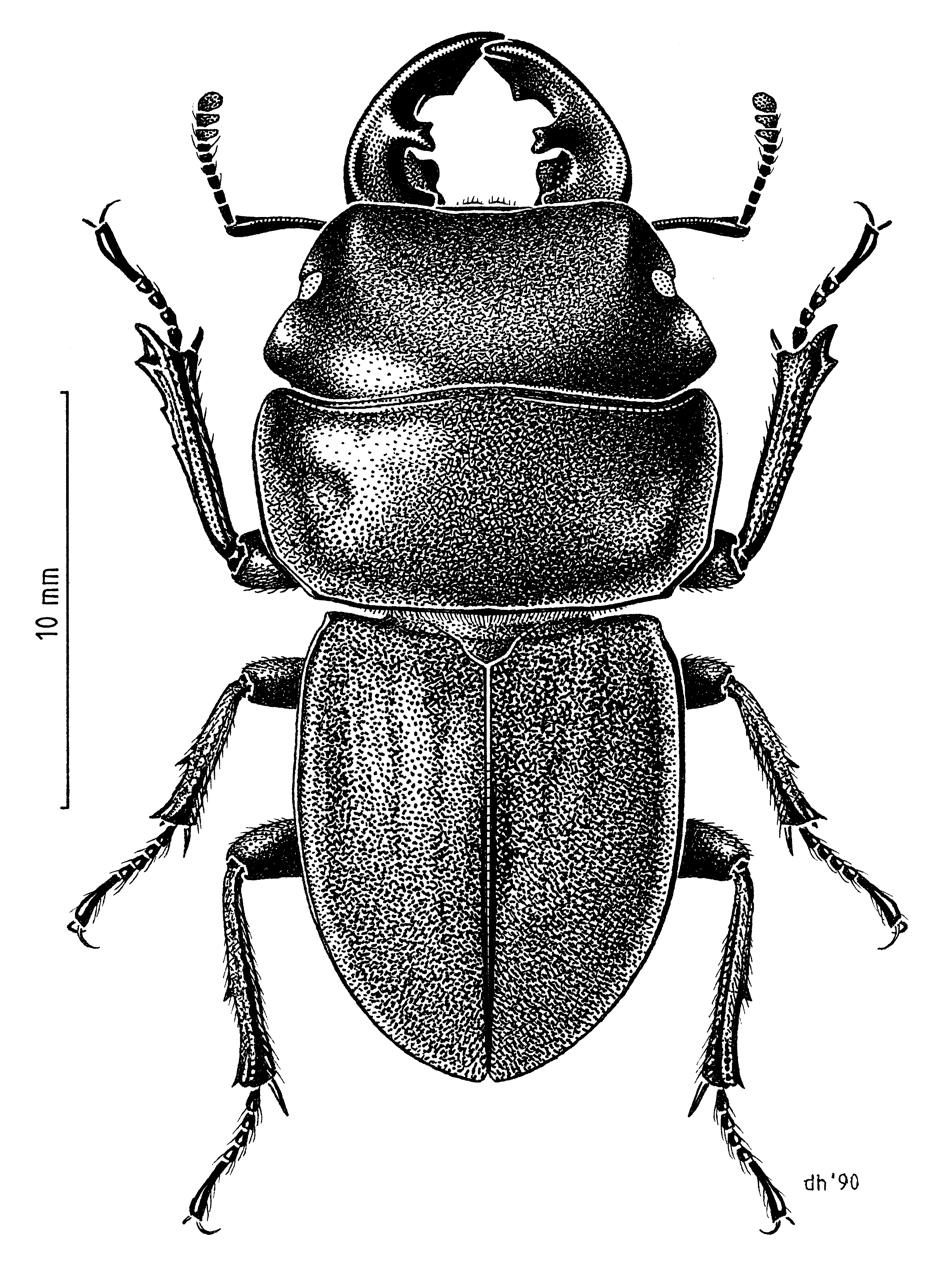
- Male, illustrated by Des Helmore

Conservation status
- Relict (NZ TCS)

Scientific classification
- Kingdom: Animalia
- Phylum: Arthropoda
- Class: Insecta
- Order: Coleoptera
- Suborder: Polyphaga
- Infraorder: Scarabaeiformia
- Family: Lucanidae
- Genus: Geodorcus
- Species: G. auriculatus

Binomial name
- Geodorcus auriculatus (Broun, 1903)

Synonyms
- Lissotes auriculatus Broun, 1903; Dorcus auriculatus Holloway 1961

= Geodorcus auriculatus =

Species of beetle

Geodorcus auriculatus is a large flightless stag beetle that is found in the southern part of the Coromandel Peninsula and on Mount Te Aroha in the Kaimai range of New Zealand.

== Description ==
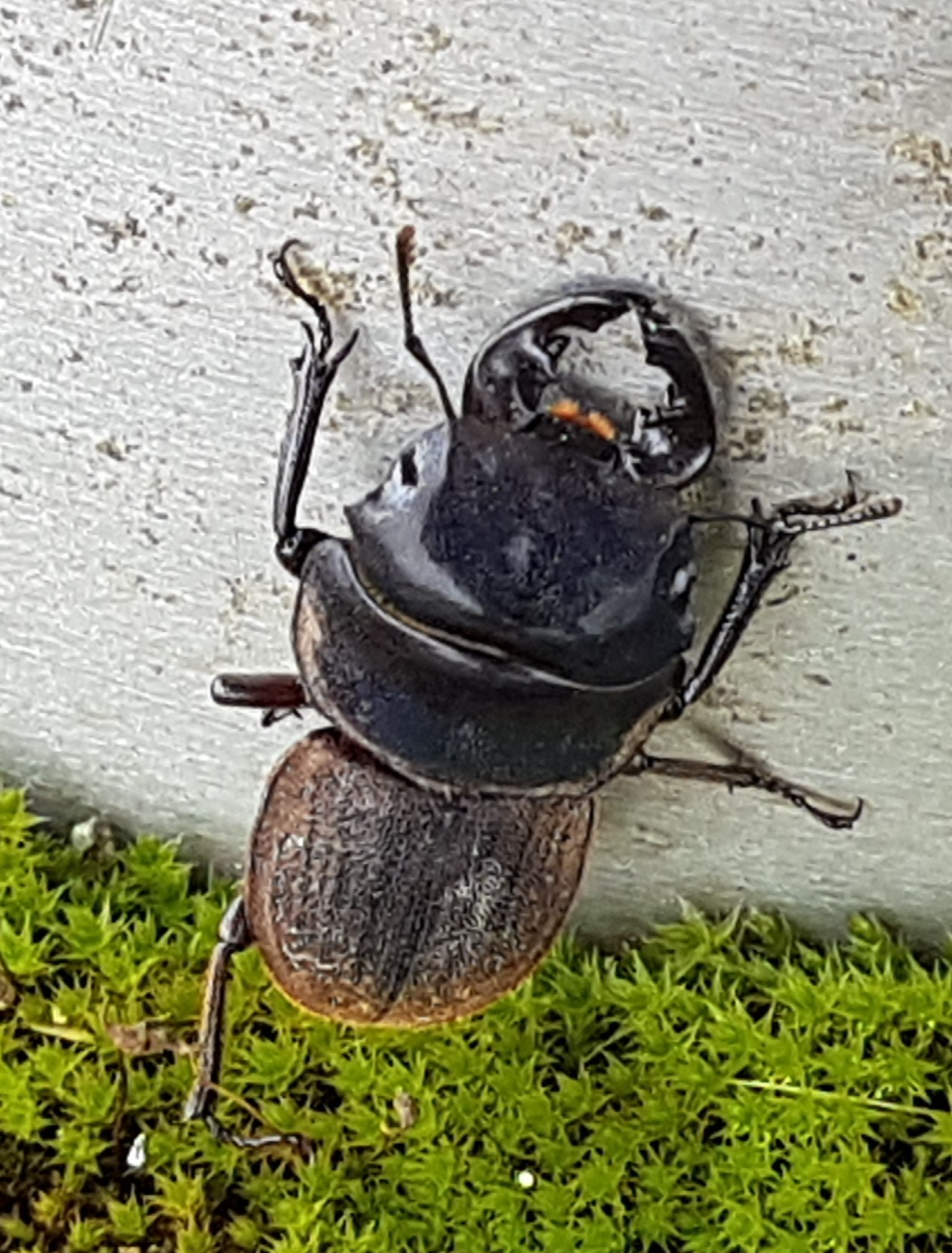
G. auriculatus observed on Mt. Te Aroha

Geodorcus auriculatus are large dull to glossy black or brownish black beetles. Their exoskeleton is covered in dots and minute hairs with four inconspicuous ribs. The length for male specimens ranges from 21 to 29 mm. This length includes their impressive mandibles. Female beetles have much less variation in their size, ranging in length from 19–20 mm. Their smaller mandibles allow them to be distinguished from male beetles. Their head is widest behind the eyes and distinctly depressed and smooth in males, less so in female beetles.

== Distribution ==
Geodorcus auriculatus is found from Manaia on the western side of the Coromandel Peninsula to Mount Te Aroha in the Kaimai range, south of the Coromandel. They can be found from near sea level to 950m on Mount Te Aroha.

== Habitat and diet ==
Adult beetles have been found under fallen logs in the moist layer of decaying wood between a log and the soil underneath it. Forest types vary and include canopies of tawa, rimu, northern rātā, kauri, red and hard beech. Like other Geodorcus species G. auriculatus spends its entire life in cool damp environments such as under logs and rocks, emerging at night to feed on sappy exudations from trees or other plants.

== Conservation ==
Like all Geodorcus species, G. auricualtus is protected under Schedule 7 of The 1953 Wildlife Act, making it an offense to hunt, kill or possess a specimen. The known range of this species has been greatly extended by repeated surveys by the Department of Conservation. The surveys followed it gaining the conservation status of 'endangered' to give it legal protection from collectors. Like other Geodorcus species that live on the North or South Island of New Zealand, rats possums and pigs are threats to the species as prey or to its habitat. Habitat loss by deforestation for logging or mining has also caused a loss of all beetle fauna within this species range.
