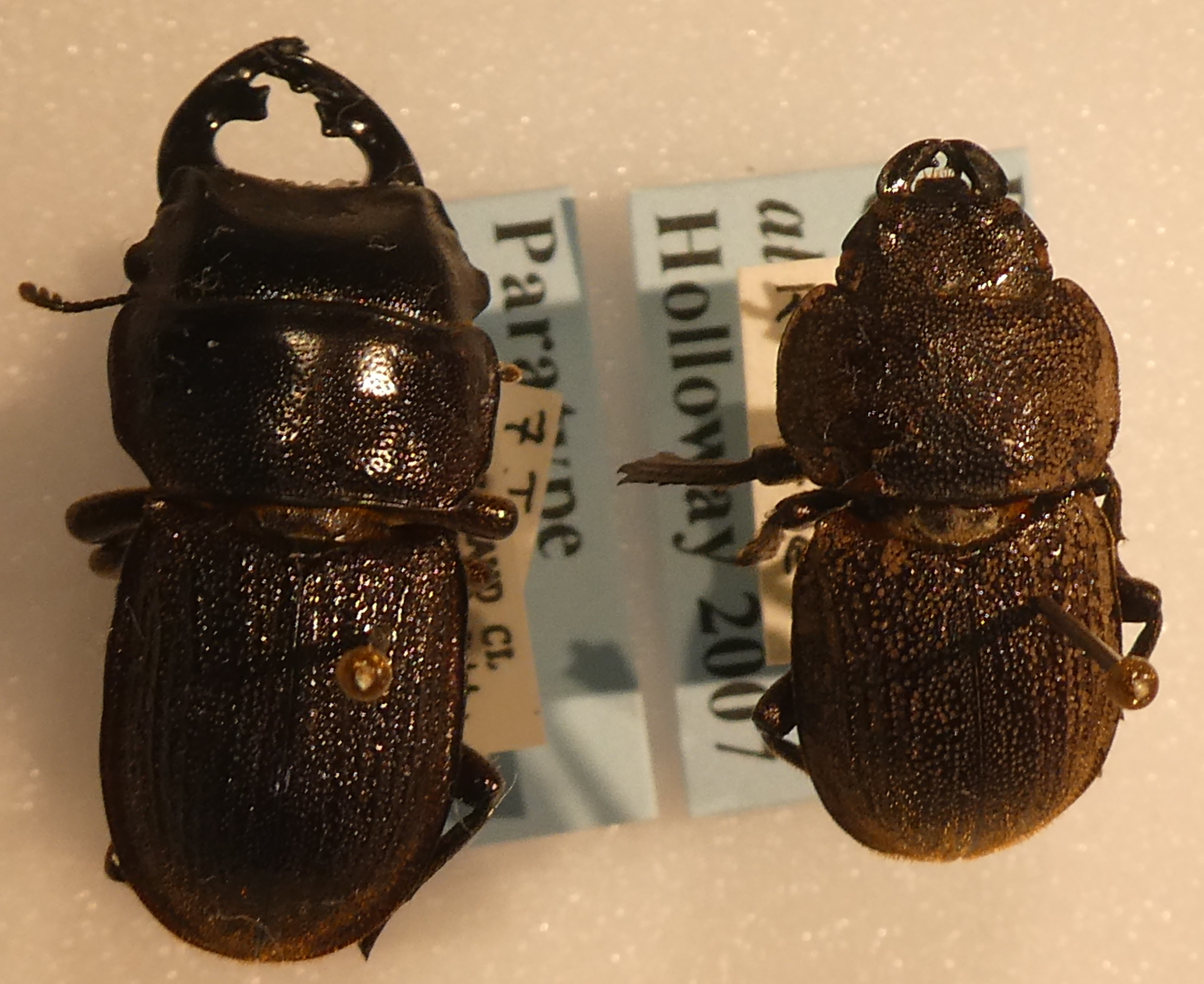

Conservation status
- Nationally Endangered (NZ TCS)

Scientific classification
- Kingdom: Animalia
- Phylum: Arthropoda
- Clade: Pancrustacea
- Class: Insecta
- Order: Coleoptera
- Suborder: Polyphaga
- Infraorder: Scarabaeiformia
- Family: Lucanidae
- Genus: Geodorcus
- Species: G. alsobius

Binomial name
- Geodorcus alsobius (Holloway, 2007)

= Geodorcus alsobius =

Species of beetle

Geodorcus alsobius, or Moehau stag beetle, is a large flightless species of stag beetle in the family Lucanidae. It is found only on Mt Moehau, the highest mountain in the Moehau Range on the Coromandel Peninsula in New Zealand.

== Description ==
Moehau stag beetles range in length (including mandibles) from 21.0 to 27.0 mm (males) and from 21.0 to 23.7 mm (females). They demonstrate sexual dimorphism. The exoskeleton ranges from dull to glossy. It is black in colour and is pitted throughout. Male specimens have an obvious depression on the head behind the large mandibles. The head is widest behind the eyes. Setae on the elytra are small. Male mandibles are large and curved with an obvious mid dorsal horizontal tooth

== Distribution ==
Geodorcus alsobius has a very restricted range. This species is only found on Mt Moehau on the Coromandel Peninsula in New Zealand.

== Habitat ==
Adult specimens of the Moehau stag beetle are found under wet rotten logs and rocks at altitudes between 760m and 840m. They are nocturnal and inactive during the day. Larvae have been found under decaying logs. They have been situated in the uppermost layer of soil under a log that was decaying, but had yet to become humus. The larvae occupied galleries in the rotting log that were larger than their diameter.

== Diet ==
Larvae are presumed to eat the decaying logs in which they build galleries. Adults of this species have not been recorded feeding, but other Geodorcus species are known to feed on the sap of trees from their mouthpart anatomy.

== Conservation ==
Introduced mammalian predators have co-existed with Geodorcus alsobius for many years. Goat control started in 1956 in the Moehau area. The Department of Conservation began possum control in 1988 and rat control in 2005. Goats were eradicated in 2007. Priorities for conservation of this species involves surveying Mt Moehau to obtain information on the distribution and population size. In 2012, the threat status of this species was upgraded from range restricted to nationally endangered.
