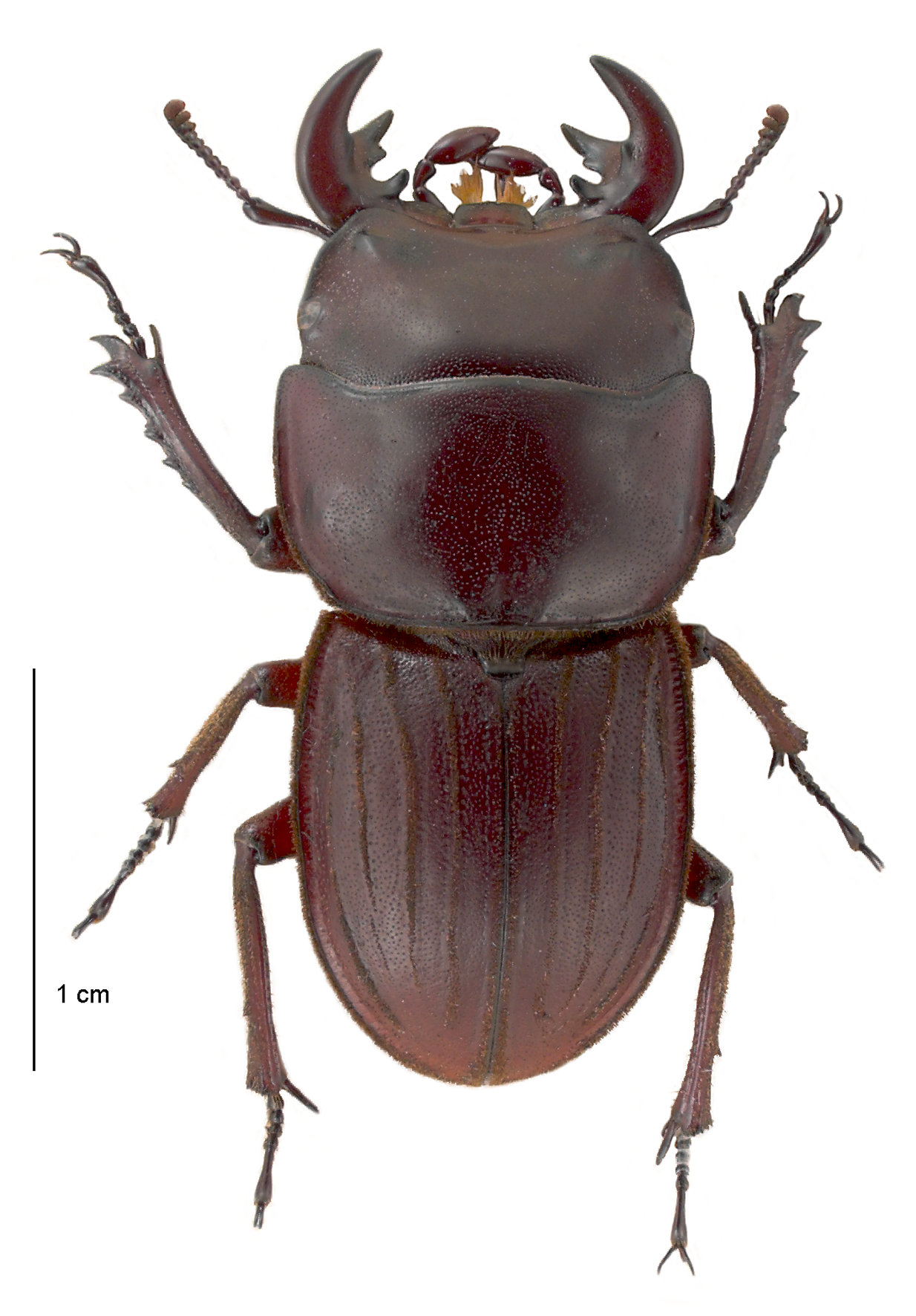
- Geodorcus helmsi

Scientific classification
- Kingdom: Animalia
- Phylum: Arthropoda
- Class: Insecta
- Order: Coleoptera
- Suborder: Polyphaga
- Infraorder: Scarabaeiformia
- Family: Lucanidae
- Subfamily: Lucaninae
- Genus: Geodorcus; Holloway, 1996

= Geodorcus =

Genus of beetles

Geodorcus is a genus of beetles belonging to the family Lucanidae. They are endemic to New Zealand. All Geodorcus species are protected under Schedule 7 of The 1953 Wildlife Act, making it an offense to hunt, kill or possess a specimen.

== List of species ==
There are ten species:

- Geodorcus alsobius
- Geodorcus auriculatus
- Geodorcus capito
- Geodorcus helmsi
- Geodorcus ithaginis
- Geodorcus montivagus
- Geodorcus novaezealandiae
- Geodorcus philpotti
- Geodorcus servandus
- Geodorcus sororum
