= The Sisters (New Zealand) =

Northernmost islands of the Chatham archipelago

The Sisters (Rangitatahi)
Rangitatahi (Māori) Rakitchu (Moriori)
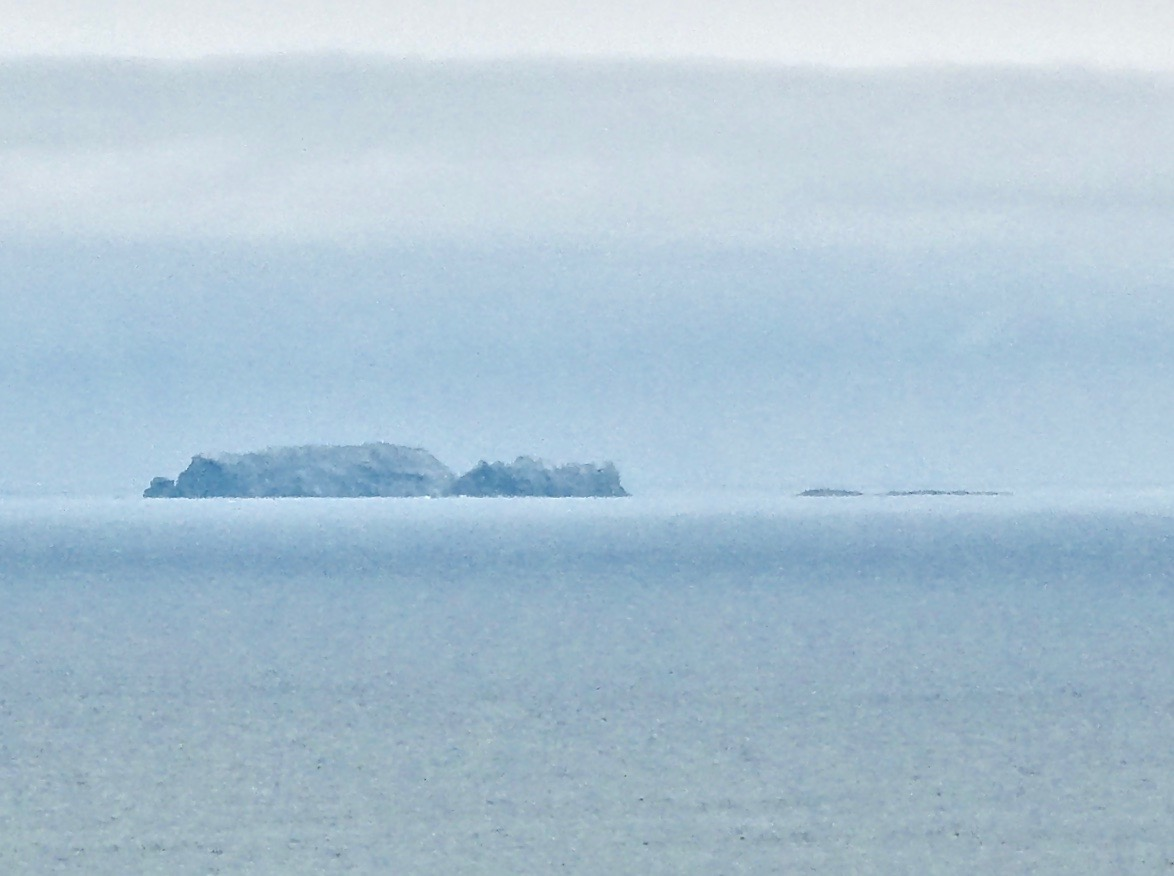
- The Sisters from Cape Young, which is 20 km (12 mi) south east of The Sisters

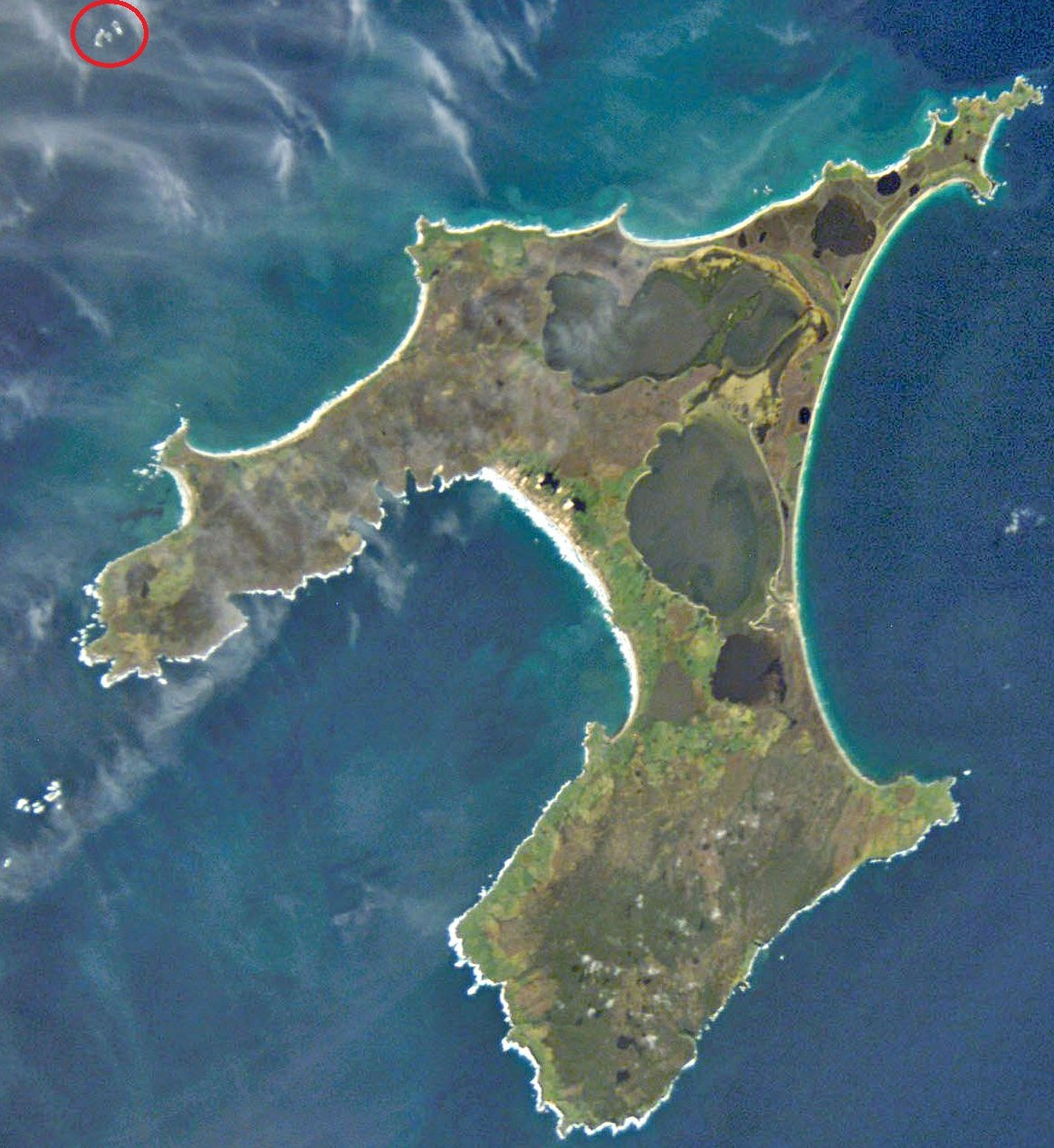
- Location of The Sisters

Geography
- Coordinates: 43.5647°S 176.808°W
- Archipelago: Chatham Islands

Administration
- New Zealand

Demographics
- Population: 0

The Sisters (Note: Moriori: Rakitchu; Māori: Rangitatahi or Rangitūtahi; official name: The Sisters (Rangitatahi)) is a group of three main islands located 16 kilometres (10 mi) north of Cape Pattison, Chatham Island. They are the northernmost members of the Chatham Archipelago, located 800 kilometres (497 mi) east of New Zealand's South Island.

The islands of the group are Big Sister (Rangitatahi proper), Middle Sister (Te Awanui) and Little Sister.

== Scientific expedition ==
Scientists on the 1954 Chatham Islands expedition visited the islands recording prolific bird life.

== Fauna ==
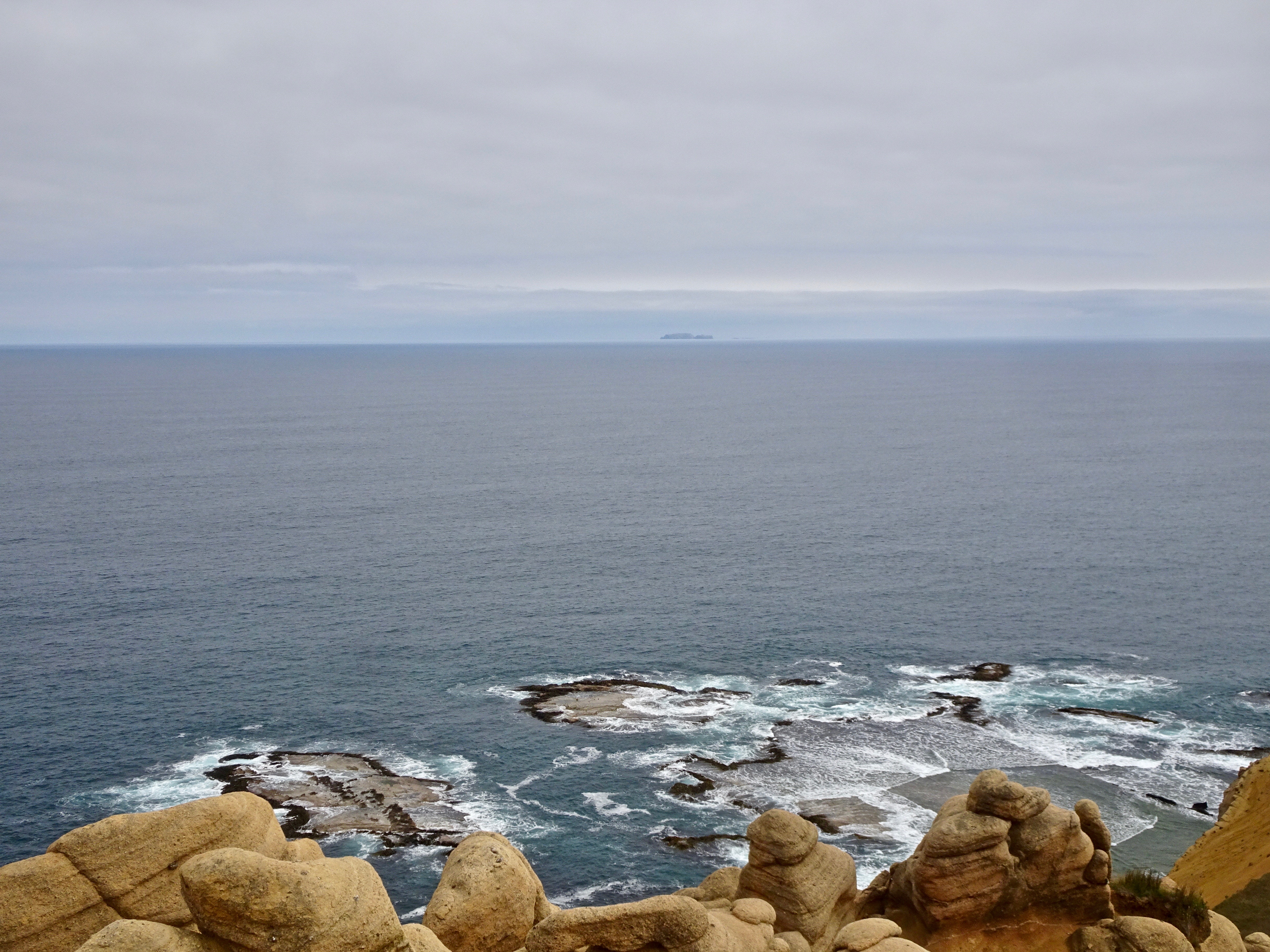
Cape Young and The Sisters (Rangitatahi)

The islands have the second largest breeding colony of the northern royal albatross, and provide breeding sites for Buller's albatross, northern giant petrel, fairy prion, broad-billed prion, sooty shearwater, common diving petrel, grey-backed storm petrel, white-faced storm petrel, pitt shag, subantarctic skua, red-billed gull, and white-fronted tern. The site has been identified as an Important Bird Area by BirdLife International because it supports Buller's albatrosses and northern giant petrels.

A species of stag beetle called Geodorcus sororum is endemic to the islands.

== See also ==
- List of islands of New Zealand
- List of islands
- Desert island
