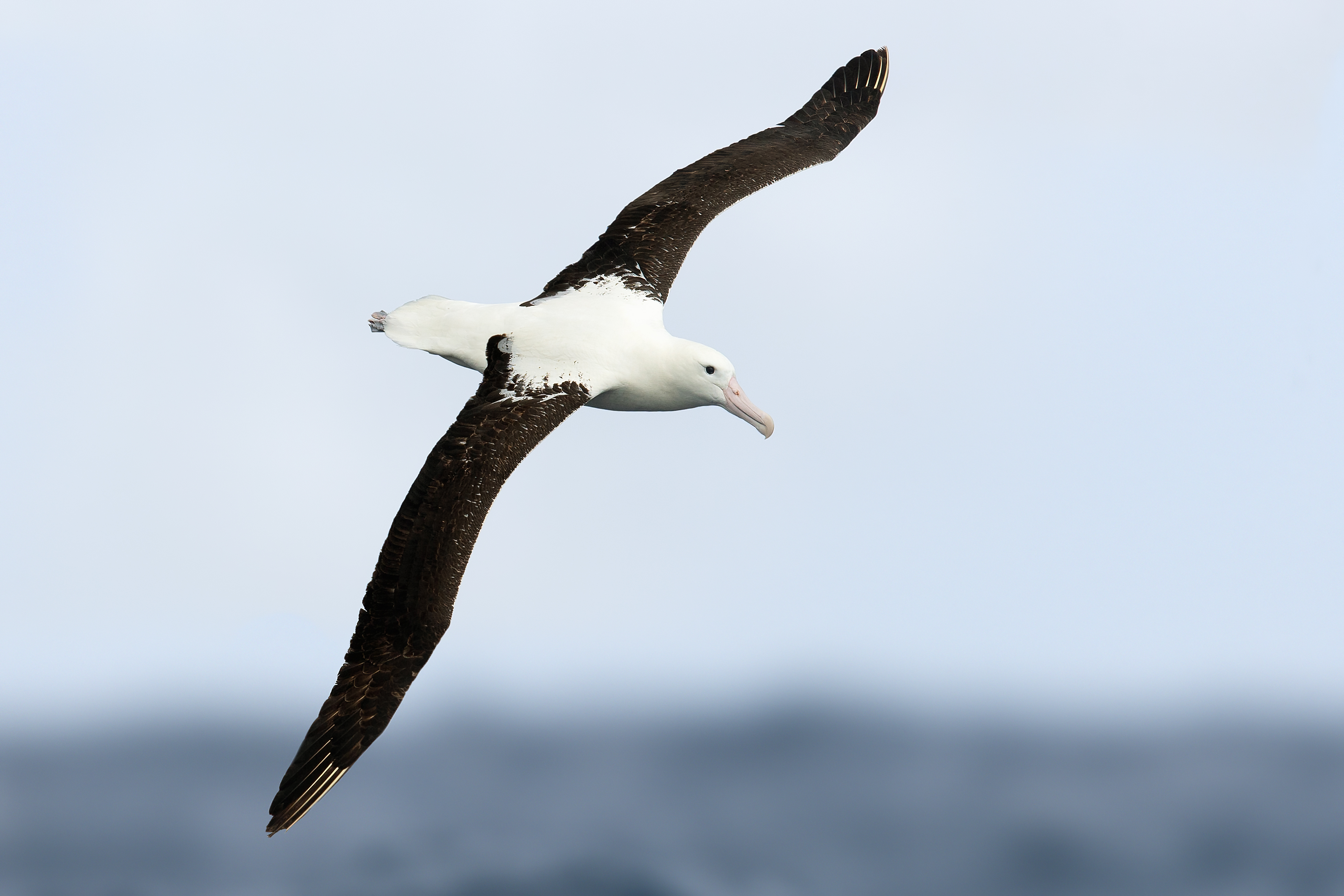
- Northern royal albatross

Conservation status
- Endangered (IUCN 3.1)

Scientific classification
- Kingdom: Animalia
- Phylum: Chordata
- Class: Aves
- Order: Procellariiformes
- Family: Diomedeidae
- Genus: Diomedea
- Species: D. sanfordi

Binomial name
- Diomedea sanfordi Murphy, 1917

Synonyms
- Diomedea epomophora sanfordi (Murphy, 1917)

= Northern royal albatross =

Species of bird

The northern royal albatross or toroa, (Diomedea sanfordi) is a large seabird in the albatross family. It was split from the closely related southern royal albatross as recently as 1998, though not all scientists support that conclusion and some consider both of them to be subspecies of the royal albatross.

== Etymology ==
Diomedea sanfordi breaks into Diomedea, referring to Diomedes, whose companions turned to birds, and sanfordi, in honor of Leonard Cutler Sanford (1868–1950), ornithologist, and trustee of the American Museum of Natural History.

== Taxonomy ==
Albatrosses belong to the family Diomedeidae of the order Procellariiformes, along with shearwaters, fulmars, storm petrels, and diving petrels. They share certain identifying features. First, they have nasal passages that attach to the upper bill called naricorns, although the nostrils on the albatross are on the sides of the bill. The bills of Procellariiformes are also unique in that they are split into between seven and nine horny plates. Finally, they produce a stomach oil made up of wax esters and triglycerides that are stored in the proventriculus. This is used against predators as well as an energy-rich food source for chicks and adults during their long flights.

The northern royal albatross was first described as Diomedea sanfordi by Robert Cushman Murphy, in 1917, based on a specimen from the Chatham Islands.

== Description ==
The northern royal albatross is typically about 115 cm (45 in) tall, weighs 6.2 to 8.2 kg (14–18 lb), and has a wingspan from 270 to 305 cm (106–120 in). The juvenile has a white head, neck, upper mantle, rump, and underparts. There is dark speckling on the crown and rump. Its lower mantle and back are white with more black speckling than the crown, and it has dark black-brown upper wings with white flecks on its coverts. Its tail is white with a black-brown tip, as are its underwings. There is a black band behind the leading edge of its wings between the carpal joint and the tip. As they age, their head, back, rump, tail, and scapular region whiten. All ages have a pink bill with a black cutting edge on the upper mandible, along with pale pink legs. The northern royal albatross can be distinguished from the southern at sea by its upper wings, the plumage of which is all dark compared to the large areas of white on the southern. The two species also differ in behavior.

== Behavior ==
=== Feeding ===
The northern royal albatross feeds on cephalopods, fish, crustaceans, salps, and carrion. Squids can make up 85% of their diet.

=== Reproduction ===
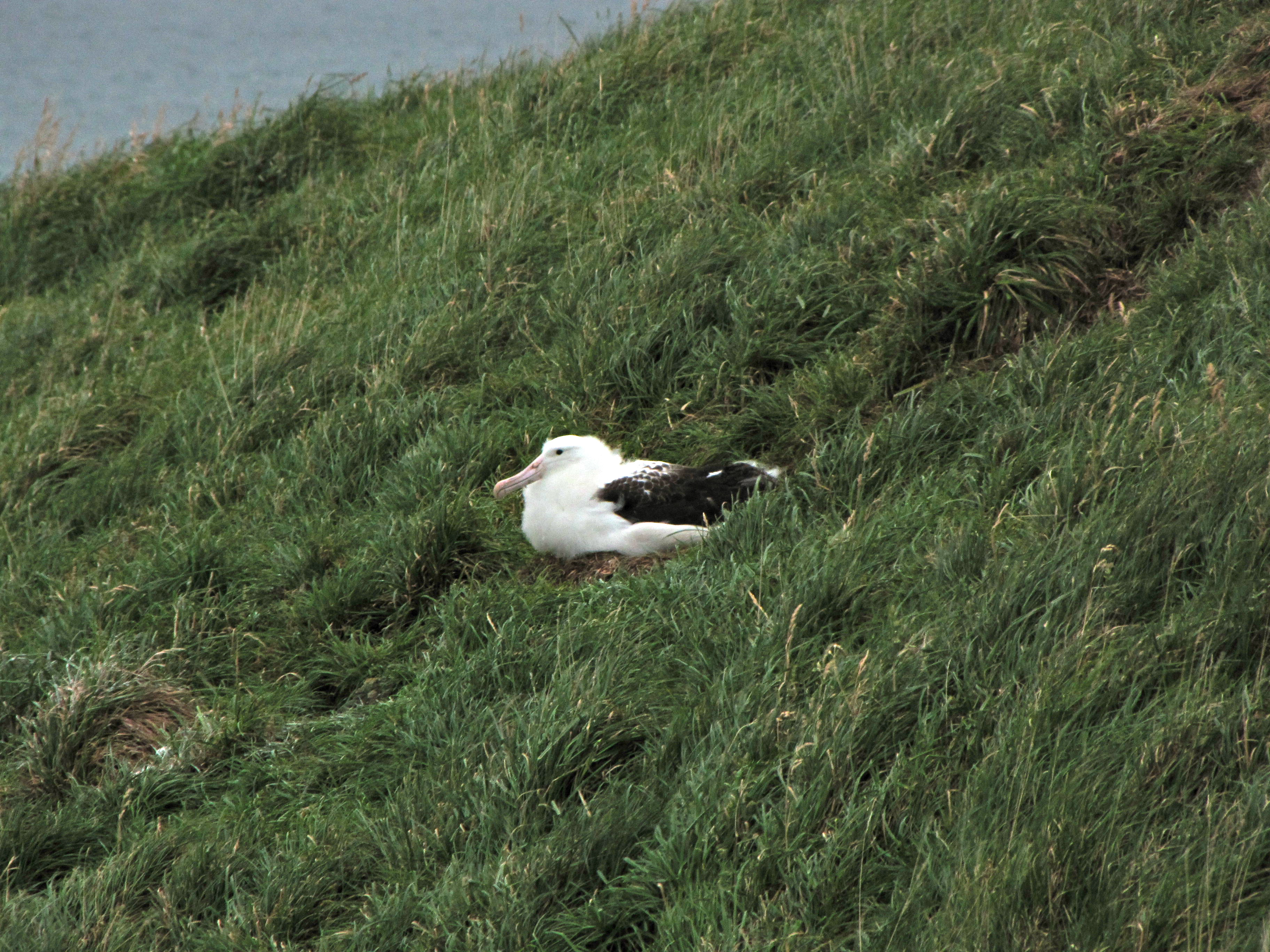
Young northern royal albatross in the colony on Taiaroa Head, New Zealand

They perform a very extensive mutual or group display, sometimes in the air or on the water. Once they form a bond, the displays lose extravagance. Breeding starts at eight years. They nest biennially and will build their nests on flat summits of the islands that they frequent. They prefer to be in grass or herbs, and their nest is a low mound of vegetation, mud, and feathers. A single egg is laid, in October or November, which takes both parents around 80 days to incubate. The chick is brooded for a month and is ready to fledge after around 240 days. Their colonies are denser than those of any other great albatross.

Breeding population and trends
Location	Population	Date	Trend
Chatham Islands	6,500–7,000 pairs	2012	Stable
Taiaroa Head, South Island	60 pairs	2012	Increasing
Total	20,000	2012	Stable

== Range ==
Northern royal albatrosses nest on the Chatham Islands (Forty-fours Island, Big Sister Island, and Little Sister Island), Enderby Island in the Auckland Islands, and Taiaroa Head on the Otago Peninsula of New Zealand. The Taiaroa Head colony is the only albatross colony found on a human-inhabited mainland in the Southern Hemisphere. When they are not breeding, northern royal albatrosses undertake circumpolar flights in the southern oceans, and in particular like the Humboldt Current and the Patagonian Shelf.

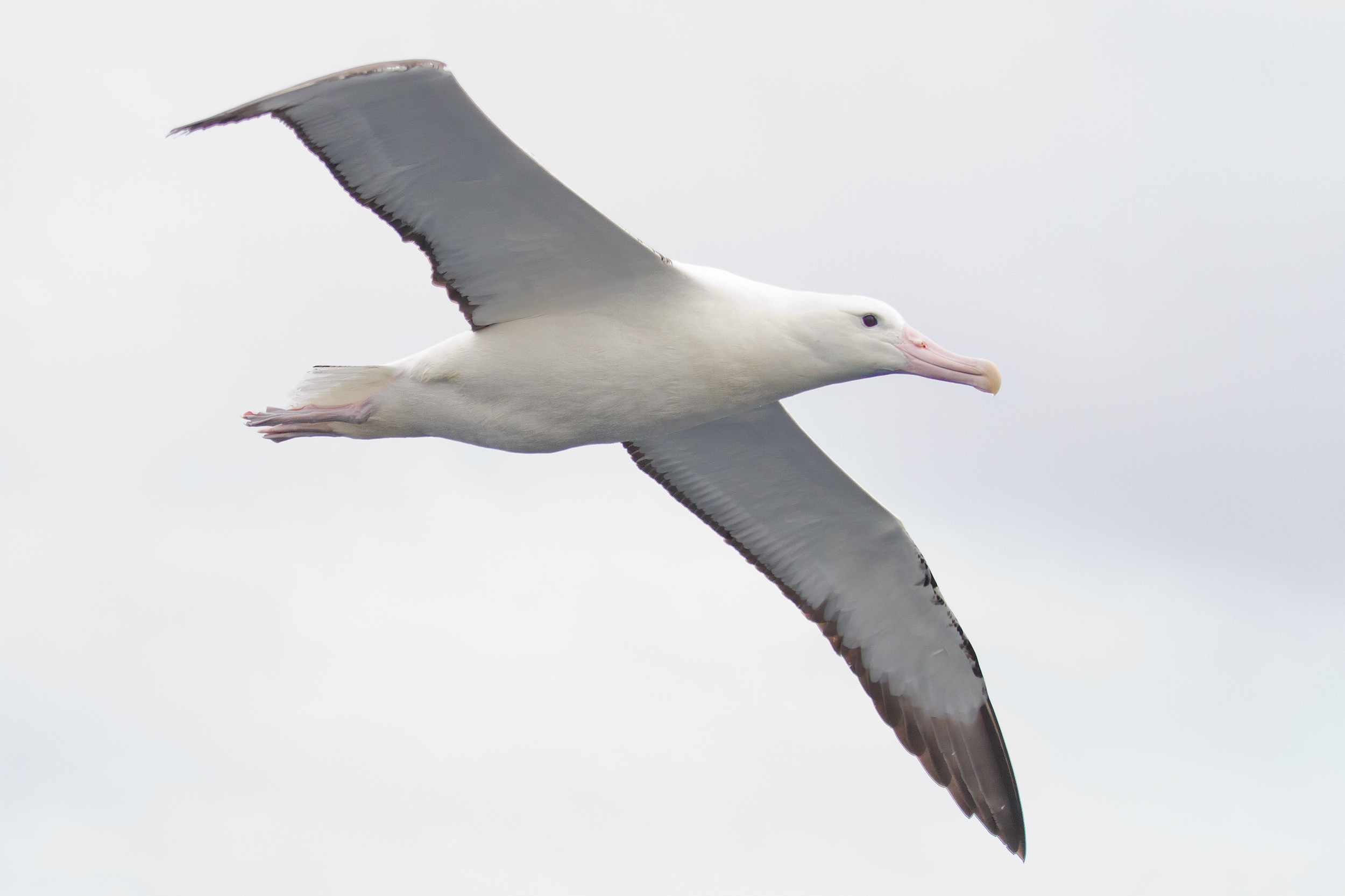
Diomedea sanfordi – south east Tasmania

== Conservation ==
Northern royal albatrosses are listed as an endangered species by the IUCN, and they have an occurrence range of 64,300,000 km^{2} (24,800,000 sq mi), with a breeding range of 8 km^{2} (3.1 sq mi). 6,500 to 7,000 pairs breed on the Chatham Islands annually along with 60 pairs at Taiaroa Head, for an estimated total of 20,000 birds, although this is a 2012 estimate. 2022 estimates place the count at 17,000 birds. In 1985, their main breeding grounds on the Chatham Islands were badly damaged by a series of intense storms and the resulting lack of nesting material has lowered their breeding success. Chicks and eggs of birds breeding on the South Island have also been preyed upon by introduced species, such as cats, bottle flies, and stoats. Finally, longline fishing is the biggest threat to this bird, even though it has been reduced.

In March 2024, a 10-day-old albatross chick at the Taiaroa Head colony died after swallowing plastic brought to its nest by a parent.

To help in the survival of this species, bird banding is underway, Taiaroa Head has predator control in effect during the breeding season, and there are no predators on the Chatham Islands. Enderby Island and Taiaroa Head are nature preserves, and the Department of Conservation had eradicated feral cattle, rabbits, and mice from Enderby Island by 1993. Counting of individual birds has been made possible using 30-cm resolution imagery from the WorldView-3 satellite.

Thanks to the efforts of L. E. Richdale, the colony on Taiaroa Head was protected by 1950. 1972 saw the first formal guided viewing of their breeding area, since 2001 more than 100,000 people visit the Royal Albatross Centre annually to watch this species. It has become a tradition in Dunedin each year to chime the bells in the city's public buildings in celebration of the first bird to arrive back at the Taiaroa Head colony.
