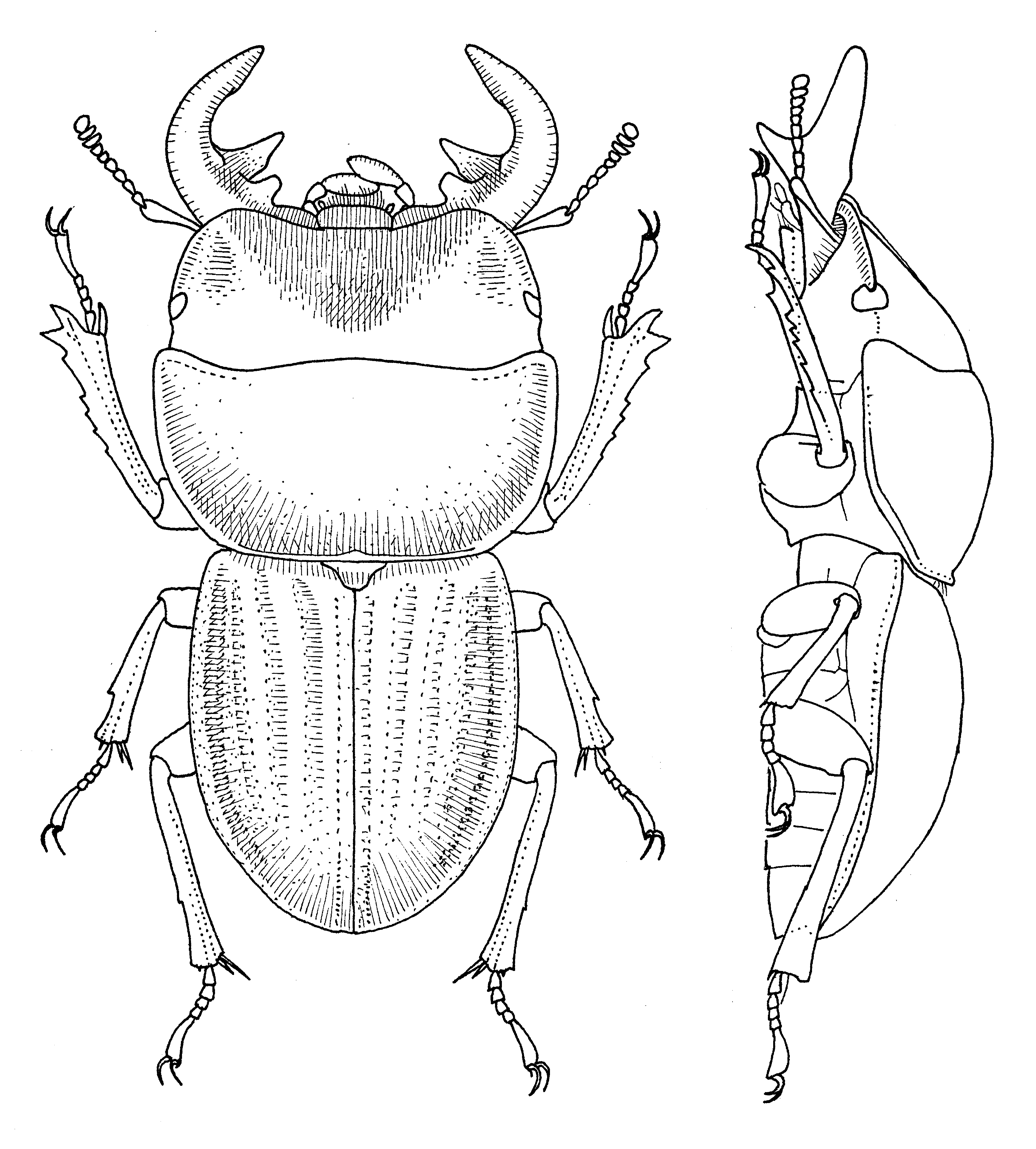

Scientific classification
- Kingdom: Animalia
- Phylum: Arthropoda
- Class: Insecta
- Order: Coleoptera
- Suborder: Polyphaga
- Infraorder: Scarabaeiformia
- Family: Lucanidae
- Genus: Geodorcus
- Species: G. helmsi

Binomial name
- Geodorcus helmsi (Sharp, 1881)

Synonyms
- Lissotes aemulus Broun, 1893; Lissotes acmenus Lewis, 1903

= Geodorcus helmsi =

Helms's stag beetle

Species of beetle

Geodorcus helmsi, known as New Zealand giant stag beetle or Helms's stag beetle, is a large, slow-moving, flightless stag beetle in the family Lucanidae. It is endemic to New Zealand.

== Description ==
Geodorcus helmsi is a large flightless stag beetle that varies in colour from black to brownish-black. Its dorsal surface can vary from dull to glossy. Like other stag beetles, they show sexual dimorphism: males range in size from 17.5–44.0 mm, including their large mandibles, while females are smaller (16.5–27.5 mm) with less conspicuous mandibles. In larger male specimens, the mandibles are long, slender and strongly arched with a conspicuous tooth near their base. There is no evidence of different male morphs in this species. G. helmsi is distinguished from other Geodorcus by its straight un-arched tibiae, and five setose ridges on the elytra.

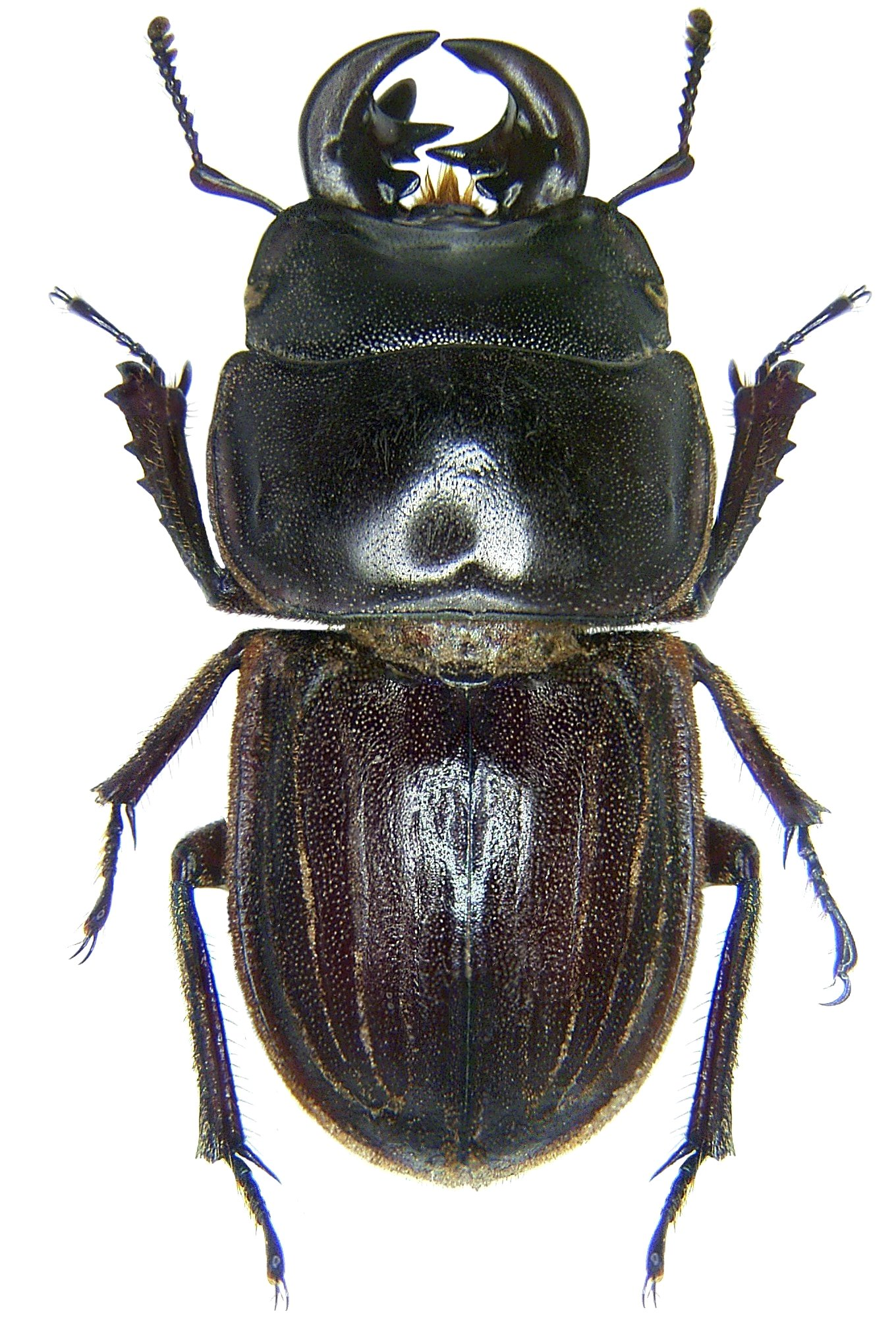
Geodorcus helmsi

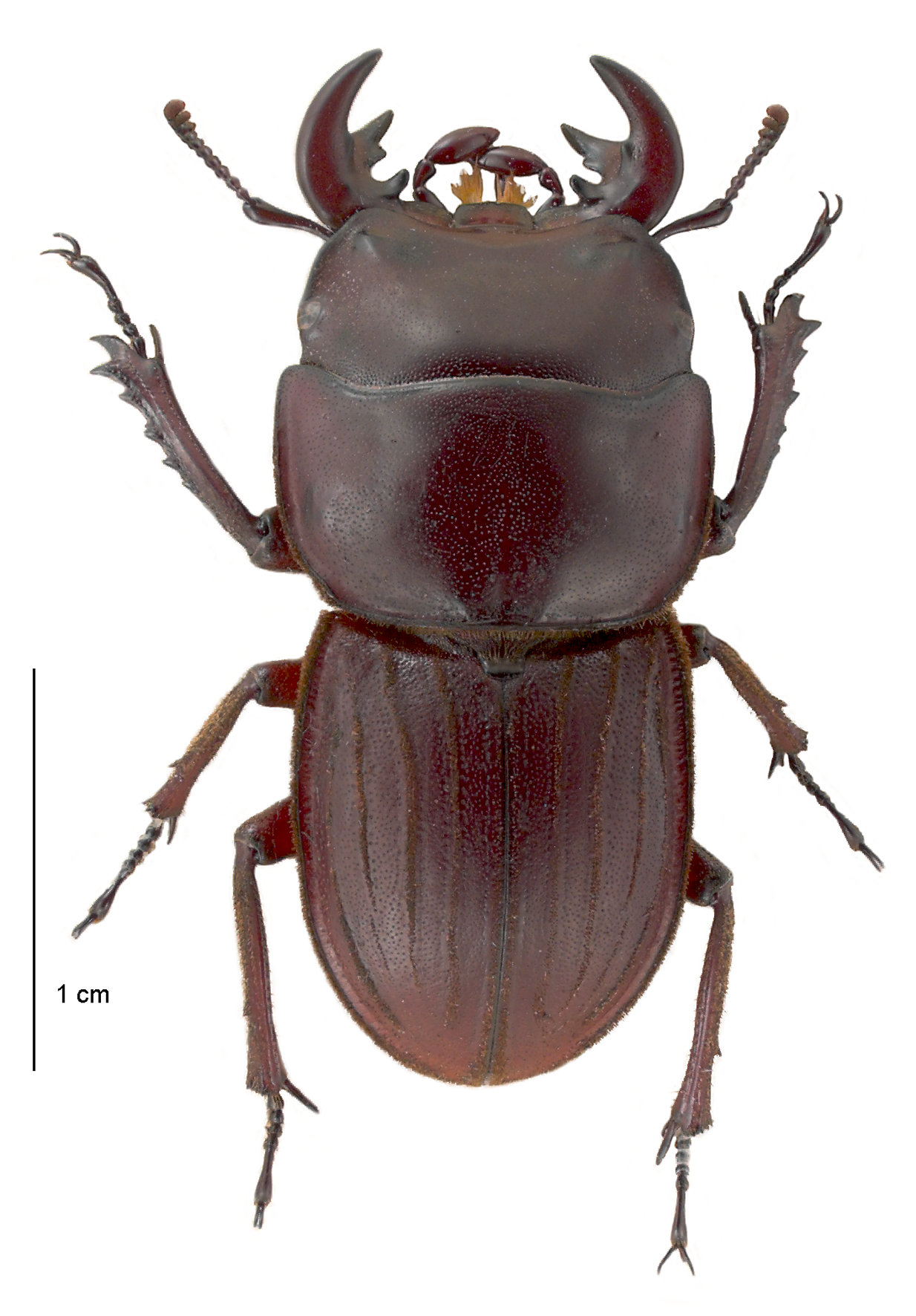
Geodorcus helmsi

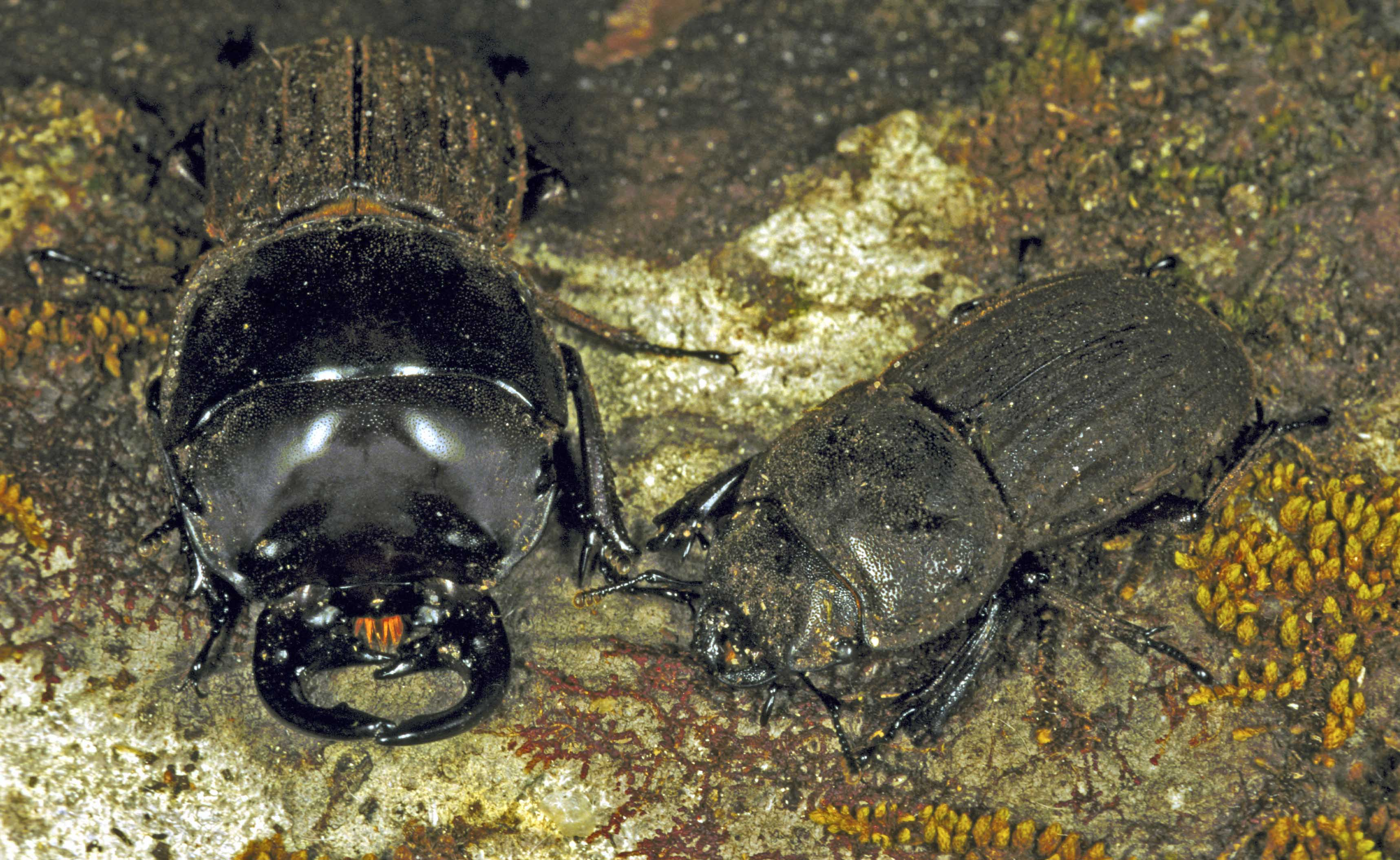
A male (left) and female (right) Geodorcus helmsi demonstrating sexual dimorphism

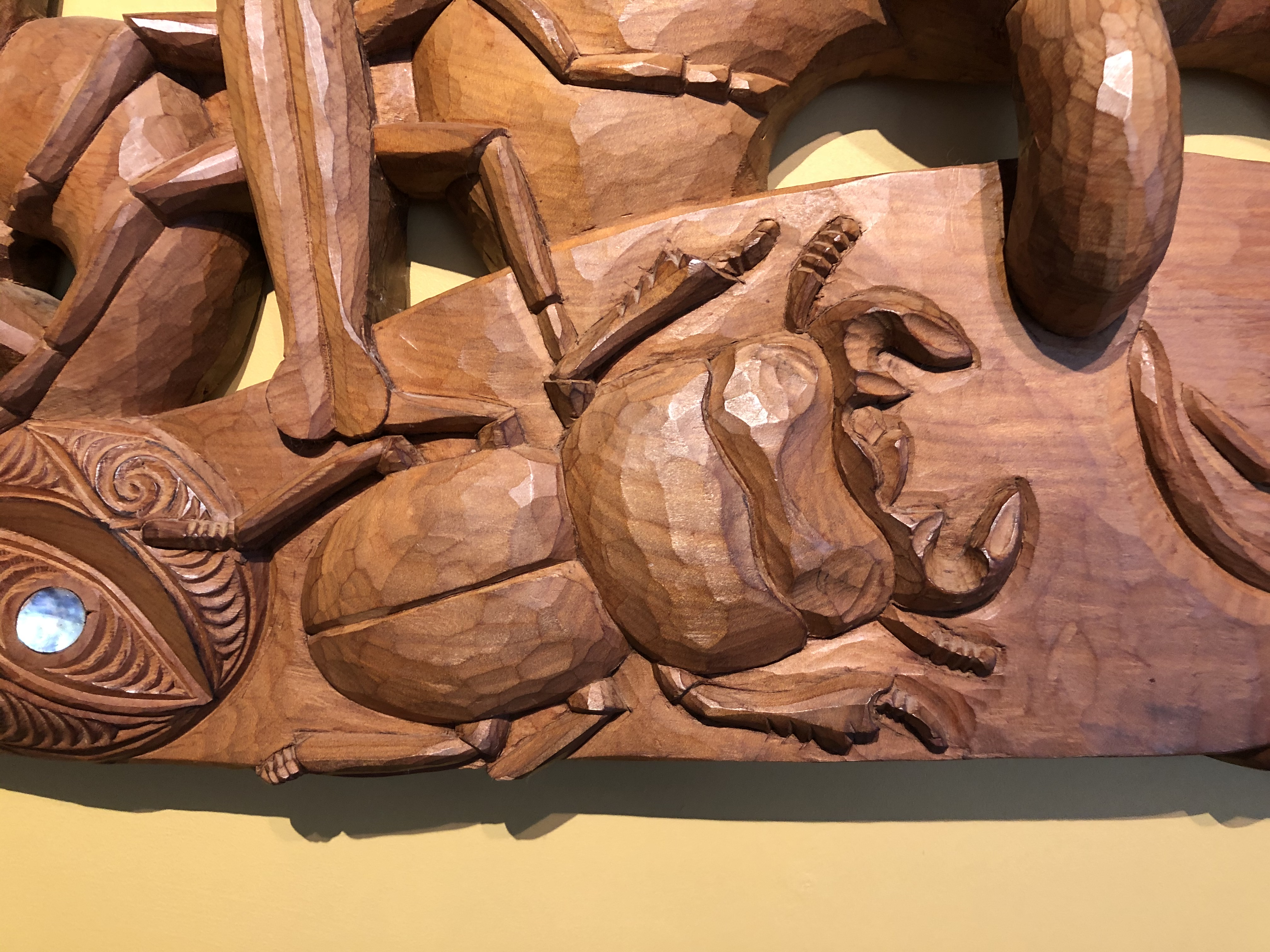
Geodorcus helmsi on a pare

== Distribution ==
Geodorcus helmsi is the most widespread of the ten Geodorcus species, having been collected from Karamea on the northern West Coast of New Zealand to the south of the South Island, as far as Tapanui in West Otago. It has also been collected from islands in Fiordland and from Stewart Island. Adults have a wide altitudinal range, from sea level to 1400 m.

== Habitat ==
All Geodorcus species are mainly nocturnal and hide underneath fallen log stones or leaf litter on the forest floor. At night G. helmsi have been seen active on tree trunks, chewing at the bark to get access to the exudate. This species occupies a highly variable habitat, including forest and tussock-dominated high country.

== Diet ==
The feeding ecology of adult G. helmsi may be highly variable: they occupy a wide range of habitats from forest to the tussock zone in the high country. Adults have been observed on tree trunks feeding on sappy exudate from wounds in the bark. Larvae of other lucanid beetles commonly eat the surface of rotting wood. Geodorcus larvae have been observed to have large quantities of humus inside their gut.

== Life cycle ==
In New Zealand stag beetles, there is no published information about the duration or timing of oviposition, larval, pupal and adult stages of the life cycle. Copulation has been observed in October. Larvae of Geodorcus have been seen under decaying logs, occupying a gallery in the soil layer. They are C-shaped, slow moving, and avoid the light.

== Conservation ==
All Geodorcus species are protected under Schedule 7 of The 1953 Wildlife Act, making it illegal to hunt, kill, or possess a specimen. Predation by introduced rats has reduced the population density of G. helmsi; on islands where rats are present, only their remains can be found. On Rakiura (Stewart Island) rats eat more male Geodorcus helmsi than female specimens and the surviving individuals are significantly smaller than those killed by rats. This species has been found to make up to 27% of the dry weight of feral pig stomach contents.

== Gallery ==
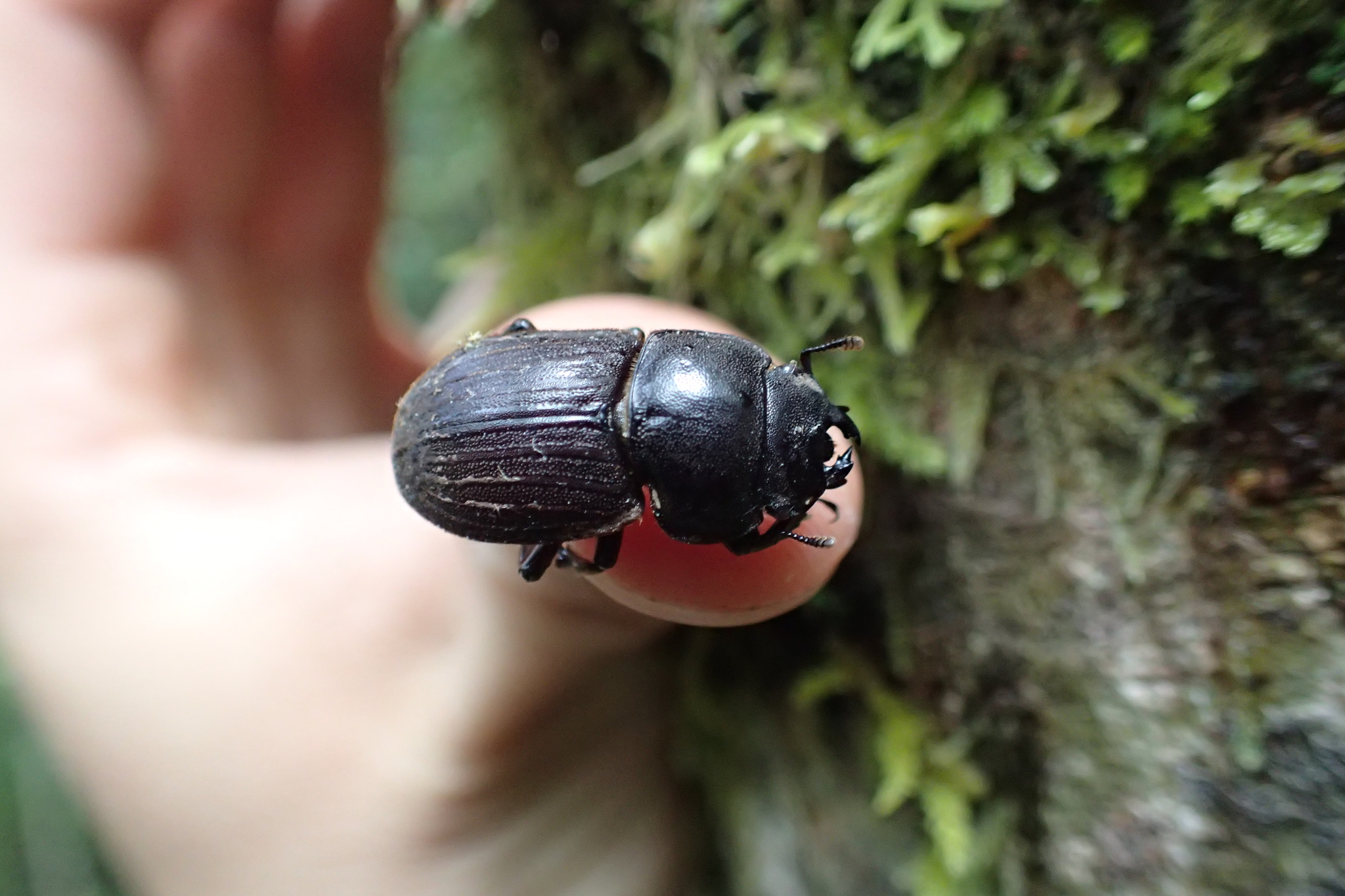

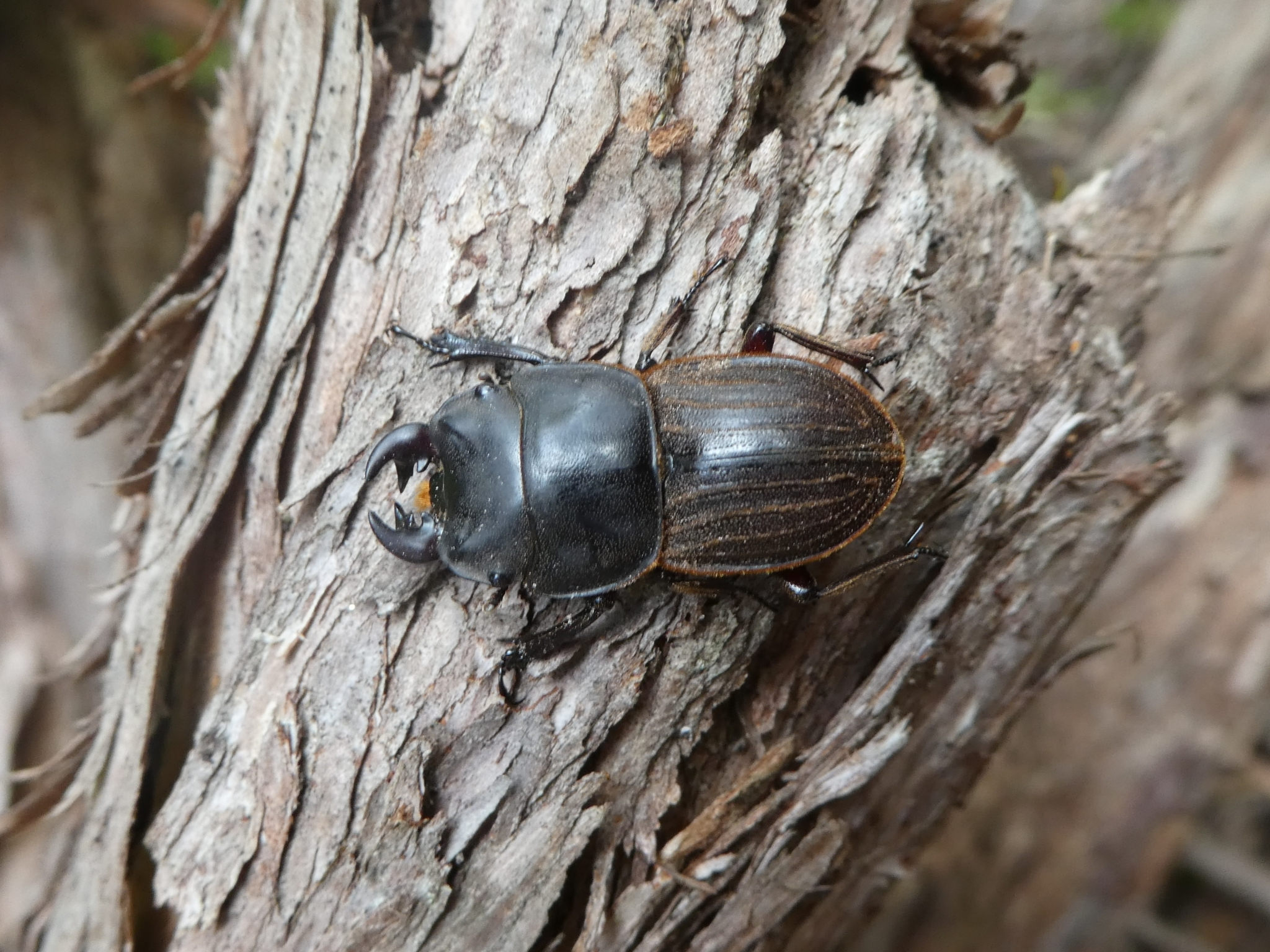

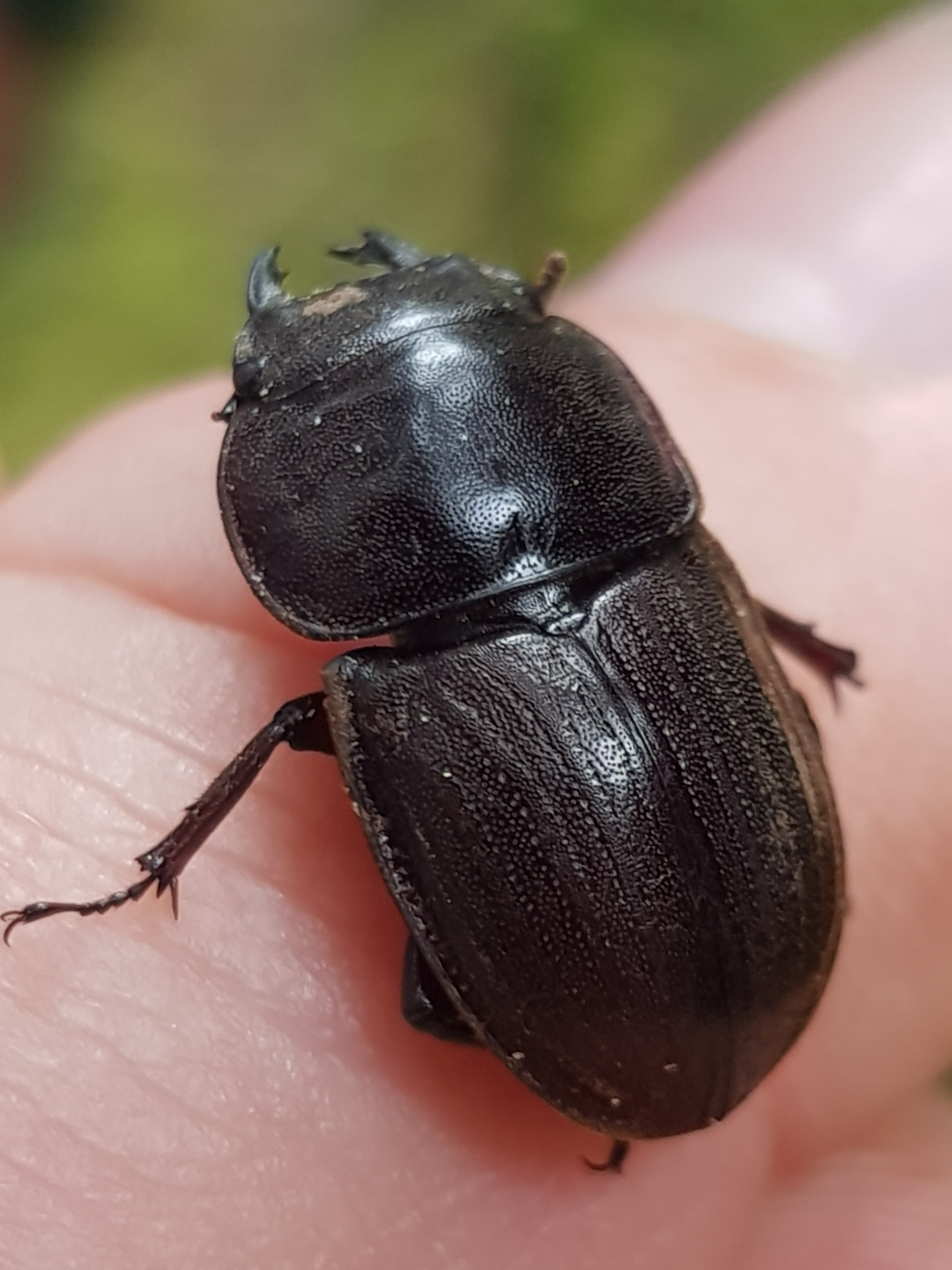

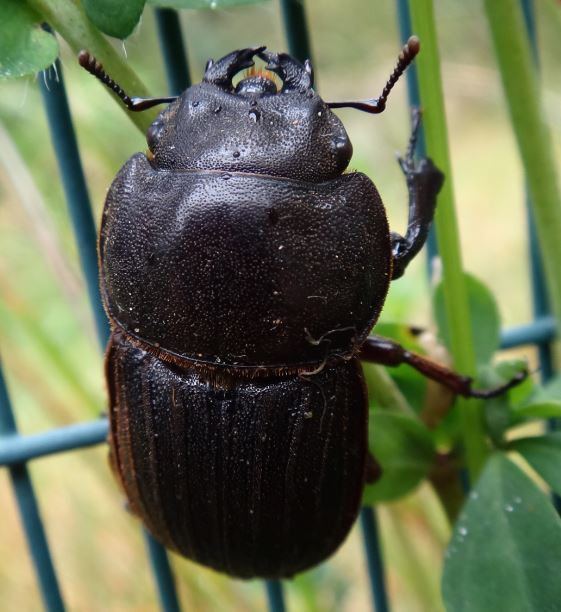

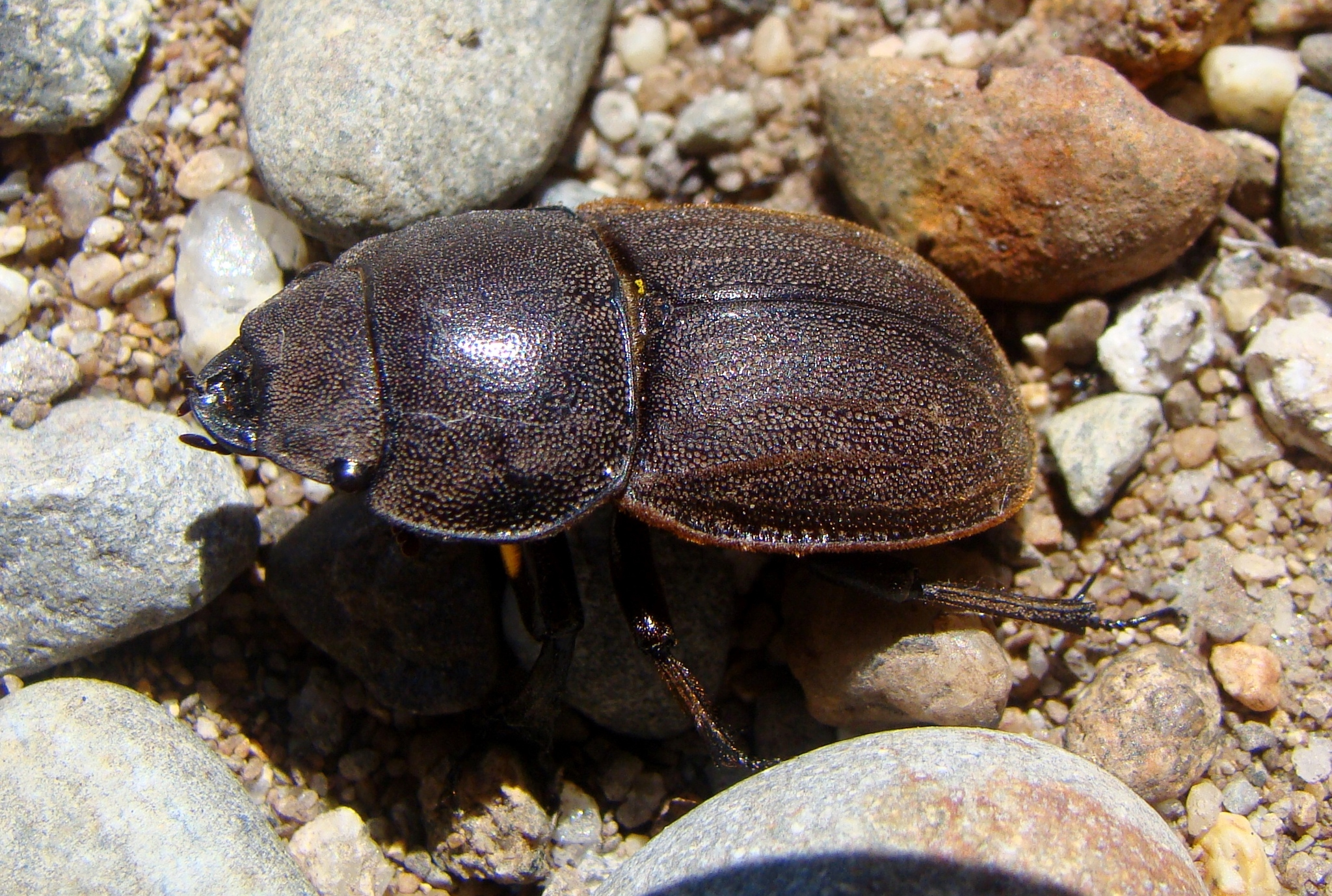

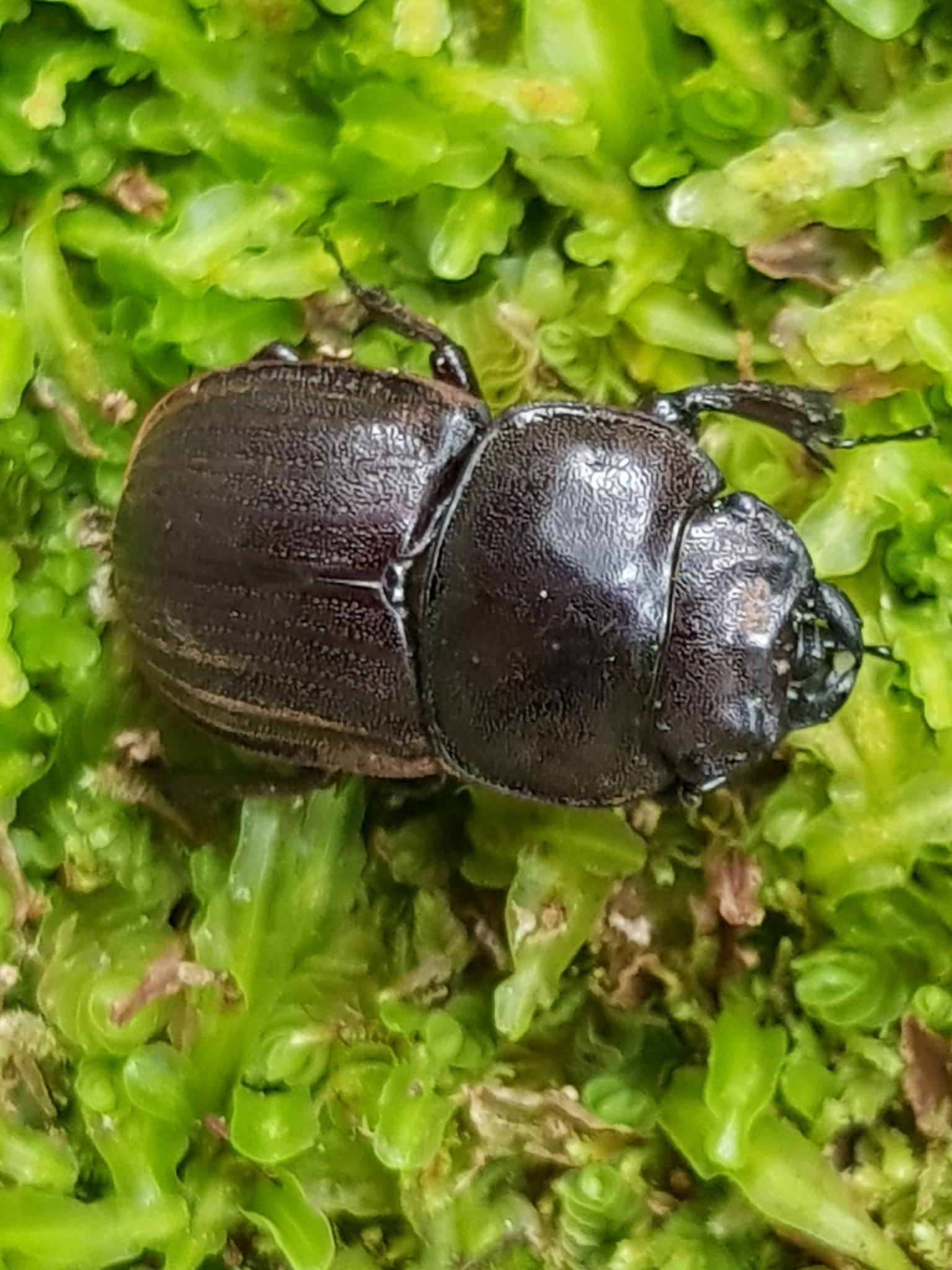
