= Beverley Holloway =

New Zealand entomologist (1931–2023)

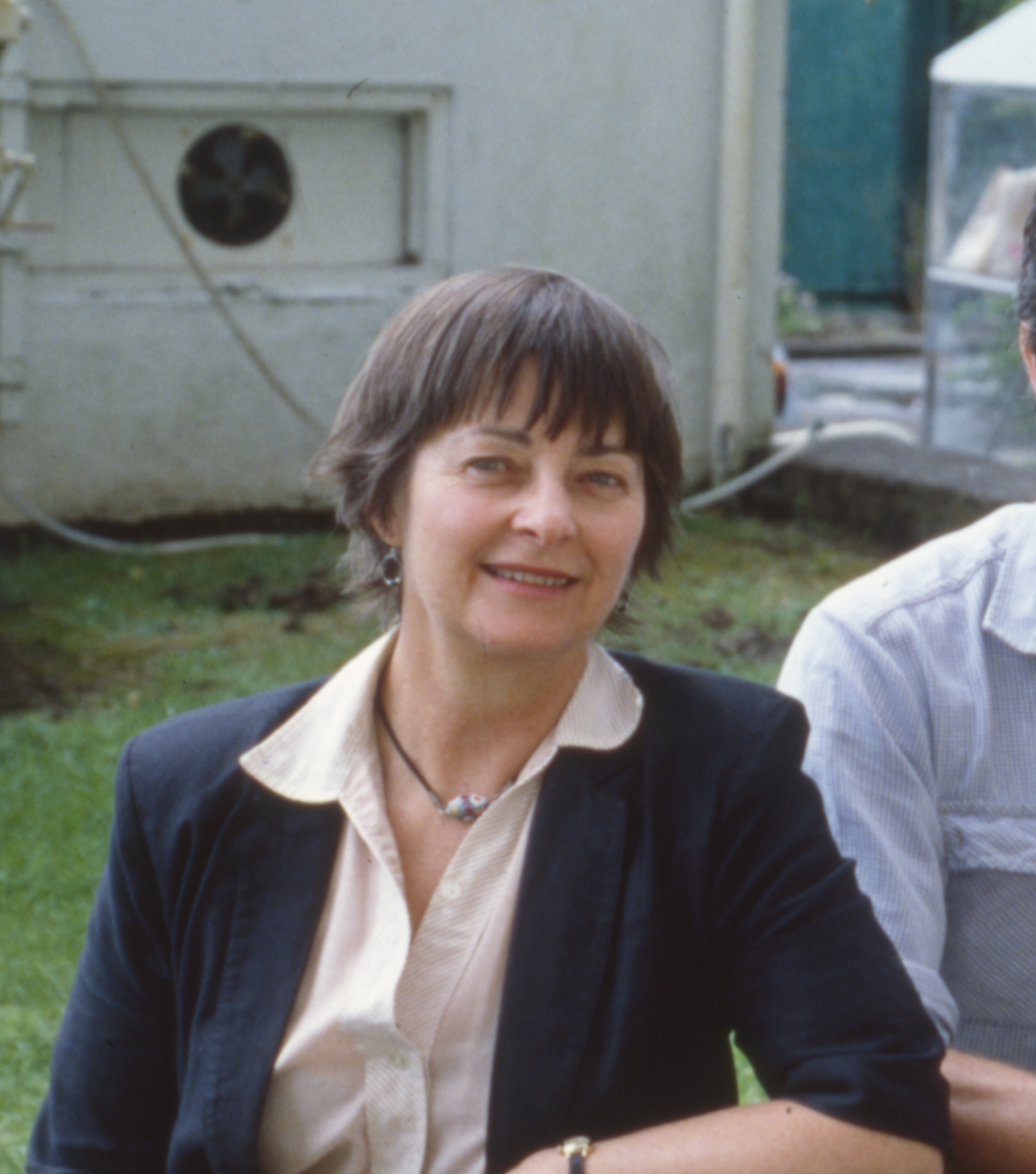
- Holloway in 1983
- Born: Beverley Anne Holloway; 25 October 1931; Lower Hutt, New Zealand
- Died: 11 May 2023 (aged 91)
- Spouse: Guillermo Kuschel (m. 1963; died 2017)
- Children: 3
- Awards: Fulbright Scholarship; New Zealand 1990 Commemoration Medal
- Scientific career
- Fields: Entomology, taxonomy
- Author abbrev. (zoology): Holloway

Beverley Anne Holloway (married name Kuschel; 25 October 1931 – 11 May 2023) was a New Zealand entomologist. Holloway was a preeminent lucanid systematist and was awarded the New Zealand Commemoration Medal in 1990 for services to New Zealand as a scientist. She was also elected a Fellow of The Entomological Society of New Zealand.

== Biography ==
Holloway was born in Lower Hutt on 25 October 1931. She was educated at Stokes Valley School and Wellington Girls' College before completing a Bachelor of Science degree in 1952 at Victoria University College in Wellington. After graduating, Holloway worked as an assistant entomologist at the Dominion Museum. She continued to undertake part-time study at Victoria University until 1954 when she completed a master's degree with first-class honours in zoology.

Holloway was awarded a Fulbright Scholarship in 1955 and as a result spent three years at the Harvard Biological Laboratory. While there she completed a PhD in biology, which was awarded to her in 1959. Upon returning to New Zealand, Holloway was appointed to the position of entomologist at the Dominion Museum. In 1962, Holloway moved to Nelson to join the entomology division of the Department of Scientific and Industrial Research.

In 1963, Holloway married Guillermo Kuschel, a fellow entomologist. From 1963 to 1973, Holloway undertook the full-time parenting of the couple's three children.

In 1974, Holloway was employed to work on diptera at the systematics section of the Department of Scientific and Industrial Research in Auckland. In 1981, she again began researching Coleoptera and in particular researched Anthribidae for a scientific publication. In 1990, Holloway's services to New Zealand as a scientist were recognised when she was awarded the New Zealand Commemoration Medal. Although she retired in 1991, Holloway continued her research. In 2009, she was awarded the Fellowship of the Entomological Society of New Zealand recognising her outstanding contribution to entomology.

Holloway was a preeminent lucanid systematist. Many of the specimens she collected are held at the Museum of New Zealand Te Papa Tongarewa and at the New Zealand Arthropod Collection.

Holloway died on 11 May 2023. She had been predeceased by her husband in 2017.

== Species named in Holloway's honour ==
Holloway has several species named in her honour. These are

- Allograpta hollowayae
- Androporus hollowayae
- Austropsocus hollowayae
- Fannia hollowayae
- Kuschelysius hollowayae
- Omanuperla hollowayae
- Perroudius hollowayae
- Plectophanes hollowayae
- Pounamuella hollowayae
