= S. angusta =

S. angusta may refer to:

- Sannantha angusta, species of flowering plant
- Somatidia angusta, species of beetle
- Spesbona angusta, species of damselfly
- Spiralisigna angusta, species of moth in the family Geometridae
- Stericta angusta, species of snout moth
- Syrnola angusta, species of sea snail
