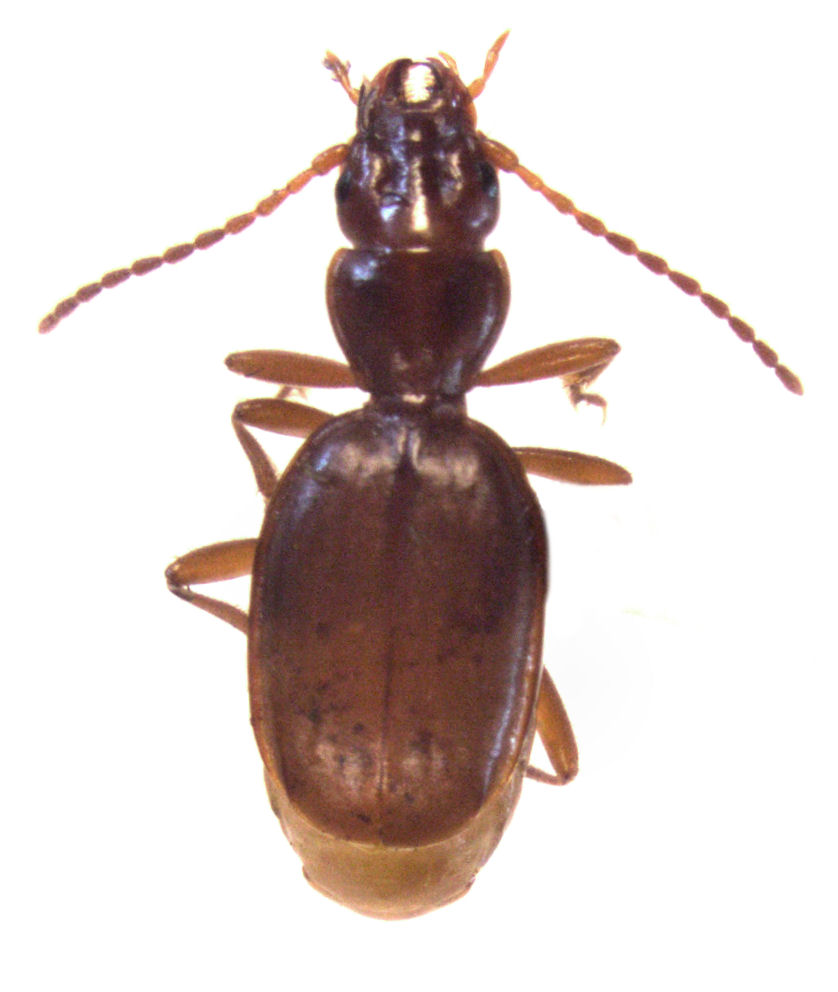

Scientific classification
- Kingdom: Animalia
- Phylum: Arthropoda
- Clade: Pancrustacea
- Class: Insecta
- Order: Coleoptera
- Suborder: Adephaga
- Family: Carabidae
- Tribe: Trechini
- Subtribe: Aepina
- Genus: Kenodactylus; Broun, 1909
- Species: K. audouini

Binomial name
- Kenodactylus audouini (Guérin-Méneville, 1830)

Synonyms
- Aepomorphus Jeannel, 1926

= Kenodactylus =

Genus of beetles

Kenodactylus is a genus in the ground beetle family Carabidae. This genus has a single species, Kenodactylus audouini. It is found in New Zealand.
