= Somatidia crassipes =

Scientific classification
- Kingdom: Animalia
- Phylum: Arthropoda
- Class: Insecta
- Order: Coleoptera
- Suborder: Polyphaga
- Infraorder: Cucujiformia
- Family: Cerambycidae
- Genus: Somatidia
- Species: S. crassipes

Binomial name
- Somatidia crassipes Broun, 1883

Synonyms
- Somatidia (Tenebrosoma) crassipes Broun, 1883

Species of beetle

Somatidia crassipes is a species of beetle in the family Cerambycidae. It was described by Broun in 1883. It is known from New Zealand.
