= Somatidia testudo =

Scientific classification
- Kingdom: Animalia
- Phylum: Arthropoda
- Class: Insecta
- Order: Coleoptera
- Suborder: Polyphaga
- Infraorder: Cucujiformia
- Family: Cerambycidae
- Genus: Somatidia
- Species: S. testudo

Binomial name
- Somatidia testudo Broun, 1904

Synonyms
- Somatidia (Tenebrosoma) testudo Broun, 1904

Species of beetle

Somatidia testudo is a species of beetle in the family Cerambycidae. It was described by Broun in 1904.
