= Somatidia testacea =

Scientific classification
- Kingdom: Animalia
- Phylum: Arthropoda
- Class: Insecta
- Order: Coleoptera
- Suborder: Polyphaga
- Infraorder: Cucujiformia
- Family: Cerambycidae
- Genus: Somatidia
- Species: S. testacea

Binomial name
- Somatidia testacea Broun, 1909

Synonyms
- Somatidia (Nodulosoma) testacea Broun, 1909

Species of beetle

Somatidia testacea is a species of beetle in the family Cerambycidae. It was described by Broun in 1909.
