= Eutassa fuscicollis =

Scientific classification
- Kingdom: Animalia
- Phylum: Arthropoda
- Class: Insecta
- Order: Coleoptera
- Suborder: Polyphaga
- Infraorder: Cucujiformia
- Family: Curculionidae
- Genus: Eutassa
- Species: E. fuscicollis

Binomial name
- Eutassa fuscicollis (Broun, 1909)

Species of beetle

Eutassa fuscicollis is a beetle in the Curculionidae family. It was first described by Thomas Broun in 1909, and is endemic to New Zealand

== Description ==
Broun describes it from a male specimen collected on the Waitakerei Range:

E. fuscicollis, sp. nov. Subdepressed; except the middle of the thorax, clothed with distinct yellow hairs; thorax fuscous, elytra and rostrum slightly infuscate pitchyred, antennæ and tarsi rufescent. Rostrum subopaque, distinctly, rugosely, and very closely punctured; the punctuation continued to the slight swelling behind the eyes, pubescent there; occiput curvedly narrowed anteriorly, very minutely and densely sculptured, and with a few fine punctures. Thorax longer than broad, its sides well rounded, a good deal narrowed and contracted in front; disc unimpressed, its punctuation moderately fine, very scanty between the middle and each side, close and rugose at the sides, closer and finer near the smooth apical margin. Elytra elongate, subparallel to beyond the middle, narrowed posteriorly, the base slightly curved towards the scutellum, apices individually rounded, each slightly longitudinally impressed before the middle; they are striate-punctate; the suture and interstices have fine serial punctures and appear rugose, the 2nd from the suture thickened, somewhat elevated, and sharply bent outwards at the extremity. Underside with distinct and moderately close punctures and yellow pubescence, basal ventral segment broadly depressed, metasternum sulcate behind, rostrum tricarinate. More robust than E. comatum; rostrum rather longer, broader, more densely sculptured, and subasperate; the thoracic punctuation different; antennæ stouter and implanted nearer the middle. Obs.—The individually rounded apices of the elytra should form part of the generic diagnosis, as it is a distinctive character amongst the Cossonidae. ♂. Length, 2 ½ lines; breadth, nearly ½ line. Waitakerei Range, Auckland. Unique. Adel, gen. nov.
