= Lomemus sculpturatus =

Scientific classification
- Kingdom: Animalia
- Phylum: Arthropoda
- Clade: Pancrustacea
- Class: Insecta
- Order: Coleoptera
- Suborder: Polyphaga
- Infraorder: Elateriformia
- Family: Elateridae
- Genus: Lomemus
- Species: L. sculpturatus

Binomial name
- Lomemus sculpturatus Broun, 1893

Species of beetle

Lomemus sculpturatus is a beetle species from the family Elateridae. The scientific name of the species was first published in 1893 by Broun.
