= Spilotrogia elongata =

Scientific classification
- Kingdom: Animalia
- Phylum: Arthropoda
- Class: Insecta
- Order: Coleoptera
- Suborder: Polyphaga
- Infraorder: Cucujiformia
- Family: Cerambycidae
- Subfamily: Lamiinae
- Tribe: Acanthocinini
- Genus: Spilotrogia
- Species: S. elongata

Binomial name
- Spilotrogia elongata (Broun, 1883)

Synonyms
- Somatidia elongata Broun, 1883; Corestheta elongata (Broun, 1883); Xylotoles pygmaeus Broun, 1923

Species of beetle

Spilotrogia elongata is a species of longhorned beetle in the family Cerambycidae, found in New Zealand.
