= Zeamordella caprai =

Scientific classification
- Kingdom: Animalia
- Phylum: Arthropoda
- Class: Insecta
- Order: Coleoptera
- Suborder: Polyphaga
- Infraorder: Cucujiformia
- Family: Mordellidae
- Genus: Zeamordella
- Species: Z. caprai

Binomial name
- Zeamordella caprai Franciscolo, 1993

Synonyms
- Yukahananomia caprai Franciscolo, 1993

Species of beetle

Zeamordella caprai is a species of beetle in the genus Zeamordella of the family Mordellidae. It was described in 1993.
