= Trichocnaeia =

Scientific classification
- Kingdom: Animalia
- Phylum: Arthropoda
- Class: Insecta
- Order: Coleoptera
- Suborder: Polyphaga
- Infraorder: Cucujiformia
- Family: Cerambycidae
- Genus: Trichocnaeia
- Species: T. hilarula

Binomial name
- Trichocnaeia hilarula (Broun, 1880)

Genus of beetles

Trichocnaeia hilarula is a species of beetle in the family Cerambycidae, and the only species in the genus Trichocnaeia. It was described by Broun in 1880.
