= Somatidia suffusa =

Scientific classification
- Kingdom: Animalia
- Phylum: Arthropoda
- Class: Insecta
- Order: Coleoptera
- Suborder: Polyphaga
- Infraorder: Cucujiformia
- Family: Cerambycidae
- Genus: Somatidia
- Species: S. suffusa

Binomial name
- Somatidia suffusa Broun, 1917

Synonyms
- Somatidia (Laevisoma) suffusa Broun, 1917

Species of beetle

Somatidia suffusa is a species of beetle in the family Cerambycidae. It was described by Broun in 1917.
