= Somatidia websteriana =

Scientific classification
- Kingdom: Animalia
- Phylum: Arthropoda
- Class: Insecta
- Order: Coleoptera
- Suborder: Polyphaga
- Infraorder: Cucujiformia
- Family: Cerambycidae
- Genus: Somatidia
- Species: S. websteriana

Binomial name
- Somatidia websteriana Broun, 1909

Synonyms
- Somatidia (Nodulosoma) websteriana Broun, 1909; Cerambyx websteriana Broun, 1909

Species of beetle

Somatidia websteriana is a species of beetle in the family Cerambycidae. It was described by Broun in 1909. It is known from New Zealand.
