= Somatidia grandis =

Scientific classification
- Kingdom: Animalia
- Phylum: Arthropoda
- Class: Insecta
- Order: Coleoptera
- Suborder: Polyphaga
- Infraorder: Cucujiformia
- Family: Cerambycidae
- Genus: Somatidia
- Species: S. grandis

Binomial name
- Somatidia grandis Broun, 1895

Species of beetle

Somatidia grandis is a species of beetle in the family Cerambycidae. It was described by Broun in 1895. It contains the varietas Somatidia grandis var. placita.
