= Somatidia fulvipes =

Scientific classification
- Kingdom: Animalia
- Phylum: Arthropoda
- Class: Insecta
- Order: Coleoptera
- Suborder: Polyphaga
- Infraorder: Cucujiformia
- Family: Cerambycidae
- Genus: Somatidia
- Species: S. fulvipes

Binomial name
- Somatidia fulvipes Broun, 1923

Synonyms
- Somatidia crassicollis Broun, 1923; Somatidia (Odontosoma) fulvipes Broun, 1923

Species of beetle

Somatidia fulvipes is a species of beetle in the family Cerambycidae. It was described by Broun in 1923.
