= Somatidia maculata =

Scientific classification
- Kingdom: Animalia
- Phylum: Arthropoda
- Class: Insecta
- Order: Coleoptera
- Suborder: Polyphaga
- Infraorder: Cucujiformia
- Family: Cerambycidae
- Genus: Somatidia
- Species: S. maculata

Binomial name
- Somatidia maculata Broun, 1921

Synonyms
- Somatidia (Laevisoma) maculata Broun, 1921

Species of beetle

Somatidia maculata is a species of beetle in the family Cerambycidae. It was described by Broun in 1921.
