= Somatidia laevior =

Scientific classification
- Kingdom: Animalia
- Phylum: Arthropoda
- Class: Insecta
- Order: Coleoptera
- Suborder: Polyphaga
- Infraorder: Cucujiformia
- Family: Cerambycidae
- Genus: Somatidia
- Species: S. laevior

Binomial name
- Somatidia laevior Broun, 1893

Synonyms
- Somatidia (Laevisoma) laevior Broun, 1893

Species of beetle

Somatidia laevior is a species of beetle in the family Cerambycidae. It was described by Broun in 1893.
