= Somatidia pennulata =

Scientific classification
- Kingdom: Animalia
- Phylum: Arthropoda
- Class: Insecta
- Order: Coleoptera
- Suborder: Polyphaga
- Infraorder: Cucujiformia
- Family: Cerambycidae
- Genus: Somatidia
- Species: S. pennulata

Binomial name
- Somatidia pennulata Broun, 1921

Synonyms
- Somatidia (Ptinosoma) pennulata Broun, 1921

Species of beetle

Somatidia pennulata is a species of beetle in the family Cerambycidae. It was described by Broun in 1921.
