= Somatidia nitida =

Scientific classification
- Kingdom: Animalia
- Phylum: Arthropoda
- Class: Insecta
- Order: Coleoptera
- Suborder: Polyphaga
- Infraorder: Cucujiformia
- Family: Cerambycidae
- Genus: Somatidia
- Species: S. nitida

Binomial name
- Somatidia nitida Broun, 1880

Synonyms
- Somatidia (Tenebrosoma) nitida Broun, 1880

Species of beetle

Somatidia nitida is a species of beetle in the family Cerambycidae. It was described by Broun in 1880. It contains the varietas Somatidia nitida var. variegata.
