= Somatidia nodularia =

Scientific classification
- Kingdom: Animalia
- Phylum: Arthropoda
- Class: Insecta
- Order: Coleoptera
- Suborder: Polyphaga
- Infraorder: Cucujiformia
- Family: Cerambycidae
- Genus: Somatidia
- Species: S. nodularia

Binomial name
- Somatidia nodularia Broun, 1913

Synonyms
- Somatidia o'connori Broun, 1921; Somatidia (Nodulosoma) nodularia Broun, 1913

Species of beetle

Somatidia nodularia is a species of beetle in the family Cerambycidae. It was described by Broun in 1913.
