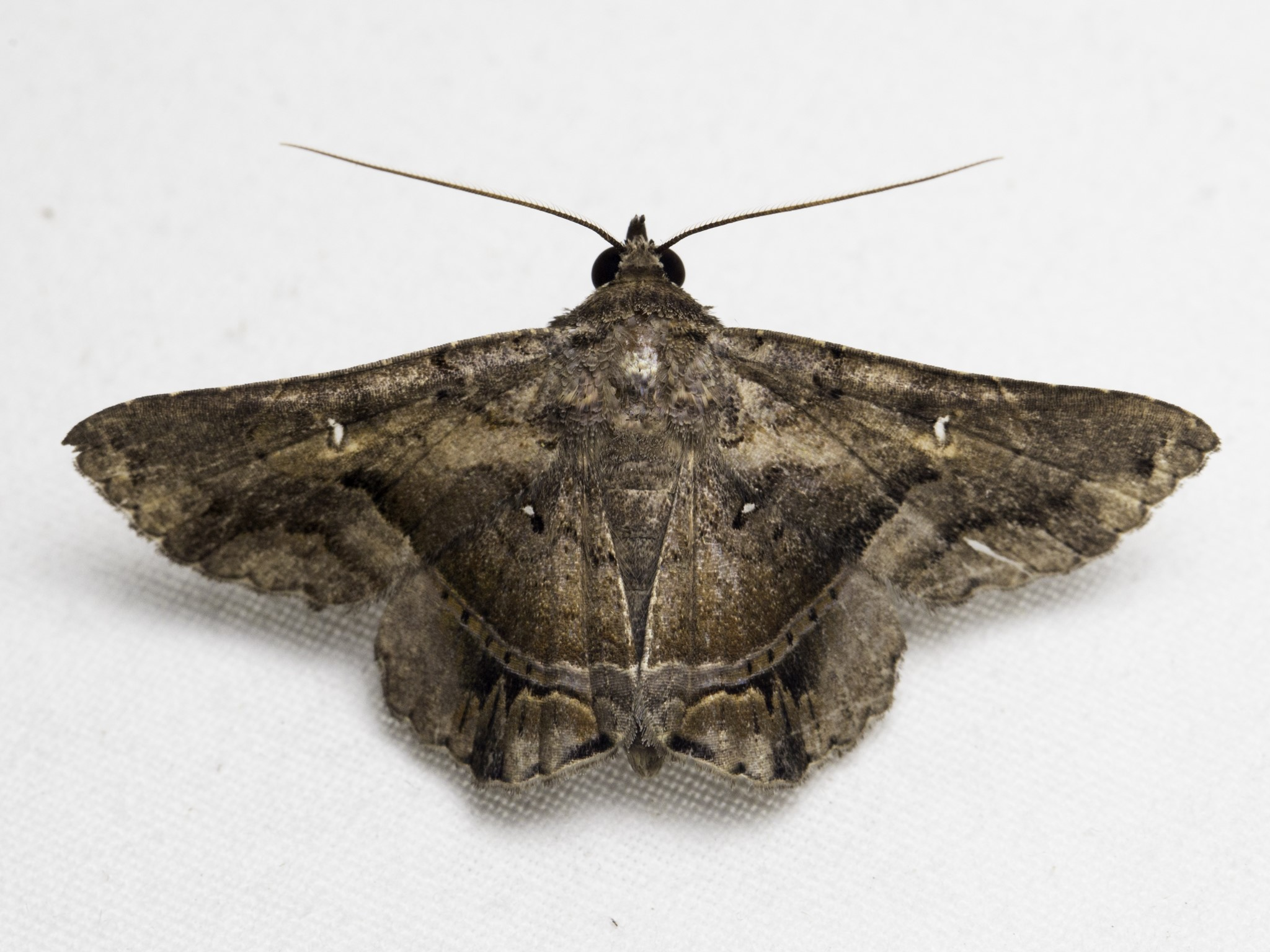
- Helia argentipes

Scientific classification
- Kingdom: Animalia
- Phylum: Arthropoda
- Clade: Pancrustacea
- Class: Insecta
- Order: Lepidoptera
- Superfamily: Noctuoidea
- Family: Erebidae
- Tribe: Omopterini
- Genus: Helia; Hübner, 1818

Synonyms
- Mulelocha Walker, 1865; Gomora Walker, 1869

= Helia (moth) =

Genus of moths

Helia is a genus of moths in the family Erebidae. The genus was erected by Jacob Hübner in 1818.

== Species ==
- Helia agna (Druce, 1890)
- Helia albibasalis (Schaus, 1914)
- Helia argentipes (Walker, 1869) (syn: Helia digna (Felder and Rogenhofer, 1874))
- Helia bilunulalis (Walker, 1865) (syn: Helia yrias (Felder and Rogenhofer, 1874))
- Helia calligramma Hübner, 1818 (syn: Helia albirena (Walker, 1865), Helia amoena (Walker, 1865), Helia subnigra (Schaus, 1912))
- Helia carbonalis Guenée, 1854
- Helia celita (Schaus, 1912)
- Helia compacta (Felder and Rogenhofer, 1874)
- Helia cymansis Hampson, 1924
- Helia dentata (Walker, 1865)
- Helia erebea (Schaus, 1914)
- Helia exsiccata (Walker, 1858) (syn: Helia aezica (Druce, 1890), Helia caliginosa (Walker, 1865))
- Helia extranea (Walker, 1865) (syn: Helia dives (Walker, 1865), Helia frontalis (Walker, 1865))
- Helia hermelina (Guenée, 1852) (syn: Helia anguinea (Felder and Rogenhofer, 1874), Helia cruciata (Guenée, 1852), Helia diversa (Walker, 1865))
- Helia homopteridia (Schaus, 1912)
- Helia lampetia Druce, 1890
- Helia mollealis (Walker, 1858) (syn: Helia discalis (Walker, 1862))
- Helia serralis Mabille, 1880
- Helia subjuga (Dognin, 1912)
- Helia vitriluna (Guenée, 1852)
