= Phialia =

Phialia may refer to:

- Phigalia, a city of ancient Arcadia, Greece
- Stericta, a genus of moths
