= Somatidia flavidorsis =

Scientific classification
- Kingdom: Animalia
- Phylum: Arthropoda
- Class: Insecta
- Order: Coleoptera
- Suborder: Polyphaga
- Infraorder: Cucujiformia
- Family: Cerambycidae
- Genus: Somatidia
- Species: S. flavidorsis

Binomial name
- Somatidia flavidorsis Broun, 1917

Synonyms
- Somatidia (Laevisoma) flavidorsis Broun, 1917

Species of beetle

Somatidia flavidorsis is a species of beetle in the family Cerambycidae. It was described by Broun in 1917. It is known from New Zealand.

== Varietas ==
- Somatidia flavidorsis var. vittigera Broun, 1921
- Somatidia flavidorsis var. origana Broun, 1921
