= Somatidia picticornis =

Scientific classification
- Kingdom: Animalia
- Phylum: Arthropoda
- Class: Insecta
- Order: Coleoptera
- Suborder: Polyphaga
- Infraorder: Cucujiformia
- Family: Cerambycidae
- Genus: Somatidia
- Species: S. picticornis

Binomial name
- Somatidia picticornis Broun, 1895

Synonyms
- Somatidia discoidea Broun, 1913; Somatidia (Nodulosoma) picticornis Broun, 1895; Somatidia thoracica Broun, 1913; Somatidia femoralis Broun, 1917; Somatidia oscillans Broun, 1917

Species of beetle

Somatidia picticornis is a species of beetle in the family Cerambycidae. It was described by Broun in 1895.
