= Somatidia diversa =

Scientific classification
- Kingdom: Animalia
- Phylum: Arthropoda
- Class: Insecta
- Order: Coleoptera
- Suborder: Polyphaga
- Infraorder: Cucujiformia
- Family: Cerambycidae
- Genus: Somatidia
- Species: S. diversa

Binomial name
- Somatidia diversa Broun, 1880

Synonyms
- Somatidia (Tenebrosoma) diversa Broun, 1880

Species of beetle

Somatidia diversa is a species of beetle in the family Cerambycidae. It was described by Broun in 1880. It is known from New Zealand.
