= Somatidia lineifera =

Scientific classification
- Kingdom: Animalia
- Phylum: Arthropoda
- Class: Insecta
- Order: Coleoptera
- Suborder: Polyphaga
- Infraorder: Cucujiformia
- Family: Cerambycidae
- Genus: Somatidia
- Species: S. lineifera

Binomial name
- Somatidia lineifera Broun, 1909

Synonyms
- Somatidia (Odontosoma) lineifera Broun, 1909

Species of beetle

Somatidia lineifera is a species of beetle in the family Cerambycidae. It was described by Broun in 1909.
