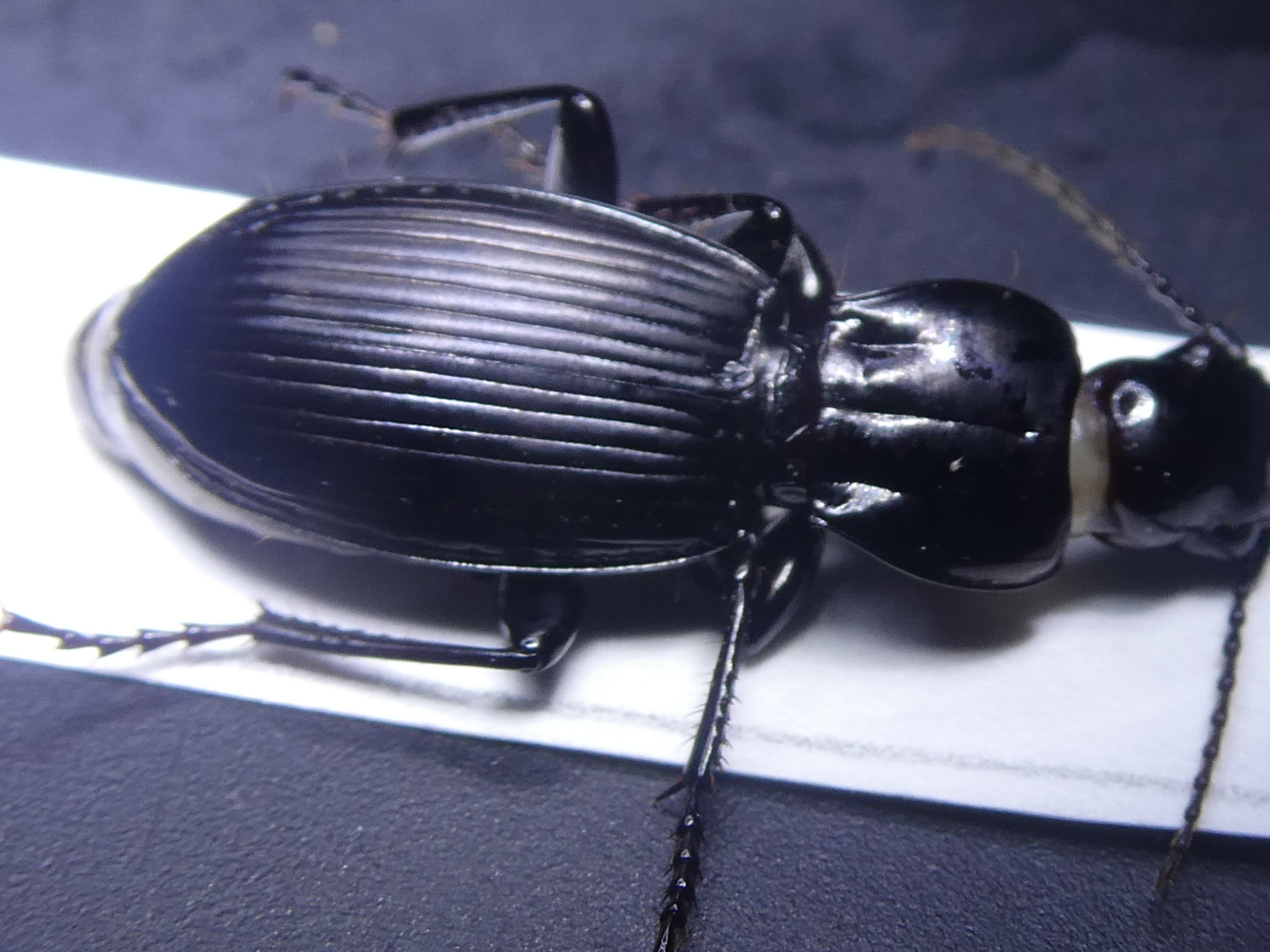

Scientific classification
- Kingdom: Animalia
- Phylum: Arthropoda
- Clade: Pancrustacea
- Class: Insecta
- Order: Coleoptera
- Suborder: Adephaga
- Family: Carabidae
- Genus: Neoferonia
- Species: N. ardua

Binomial name
- Neoferonia ardua Broun, 1893

= Neoferonia ardua =

Species of beetle from New Zealand

Neoferonia ardua is a species of ground beetle in the genus Neoferonia. It was discovered by entomologist Thomas Broun in 1893. It is endemic to New Zealand.
