= Somatidia pinguis =

Scientific classification
- Kingdom: Animalia
- Phylum: Arthropoda
- Class: Insecta
- Order: Coleoptera
- Suborder: Polyphaga
- Infraorder: Cucujiformia
- Family: Cerambycidae
- Genus: Somatidia
- Species: S. pinguis

Binomial name
- Somatidia pinguis Broun, 1913

Synonyms
- Somatidia (Laevisoma) pinguis Broun, 1913

Species of beetle

Somatidia pinguis is a species of beetle in the family Cerambycidae. It was described by the entomologist Thomas Broun in 1913.
