= Somatidia latula =

Scientific classification
- Kingdom: Animalia
- Phylum: Arthropoda
- Class: Insecta
- Order: Coleoptera
- Suborder: Polyphaga
- Infraorder: Cucujiformia
- Family: Cerambycidae
- Genus: Somatidia
- Species: S. latula

Binomial name
- Somatidia latula Broun, 1893

Synonyms
- Somatidia commoda Broun, 1921; Somatidia (Ptinosoma) latula Broun, 1893; Somatidia oedemera Broun, 1921

Species of beetle

Somatidia latula is a species of beetle in the family Cerambycidae. It was described by Broun in 1893. It contains the varietas Somatidia latula var. obesula.
