= Somatidia waitei =

Scientific classification
- Kingdom: Animalia
- Phylum: Arthropoda
- Class: Insecta
- Order: Coleoptera
- Suborder: Polyphaga
- Infraorder: Cucujiformia
- Family: Cerambycidae
- Genus: Somatidia
- Species: S. waitei

Binomial name
- Somatidia waitei Broun, 1911

Synonyms
- Somatidia (Ptinosoma) waitei Broun, 1911; Cerambyx waitei Broun, 1911

Species of beetle

Somatidia waitei is a species of beetle in the family Cerambycidae. It was described by Broun in 1911. It is known from the Chatham Islands.
