= Somatidia corticola =

Scientific classification
- Kingdom: Animalia
- Phylum: Arthropoda
- Class: Insecta
- Order: Coleoptera
- Suborder: Polyphaga
- Infraorder: Cucujiformia
- Family: Cerambycidae
- Genus: Somatidia
- Species: S. corticola

Binomial name
- Somatidia corticola Broun, 1913

Synonyms
- Somatidia (Tenebrosoma) corticola Broun, 1913

Species of beetle

Somatidia corticola is a species of beetle in the family Cerambycidae. It was described by Broun in 1913. It is known from New Zealand.
