= Somatidia convexa =

Scientific classification
- Kingdom: Animalia
- Phylum: Arthropoda
- Class: Insecta
- Order: Coleoptera
- Suborder: Polyphaga
- Infraorder: Cucujiformia
- Family: Cerambycidae
- Genus: Somatidia
- Species: S. convexa

Binomial name
- Somatidia convexa Broun, 1893

Synonyms
- Somatidia vicina Broun, 1911; Somatidia (Ptinosoma) convexa Broun, 1893

Species of beetle

Somatidia convexa is a species of beetle in the family Cerambycidae. It was described by Broun in 1893. It is known from New Zealand. It contains the varietas Somatidia convexa var. sericophora.
