= Somatidia ruficornis =

Scientific classification
- Kingdom: Animalia
- Phylum: Arthropoda
- Class: Insecta
- Order: Coleoptera
- Suborder: Polyphaga
- Infraorder: Cucujiformia
- Family: Cerambycidae
- Genus: Somatidia
- Species: S. ruficornis

Binomial name
- Somatidia ruficornis Broun, 1914

Synonyms
- Somatidia (Ptinosoma) ruficornis Broun, 1914

Species of beetle

Somatidia ruficornis is a species of beetle in the family Cerambycidae. It was described by New Zealand entomologist Thomas Broun in 1914.
