= Neoferonia prolixa =

Scientific classification
- Kingdom: Animalia
- Phylum: Arthropoda
- Clade: Pancrustacea
- Class: Insecta
- Order: Coleoptera
- Suborder: Adephaga
- Family: Carabidae
- Genus: Neoferonia
- Species: N. prolixa

Binomial name
- Neoferonia prolixa Broun, 1880

Synonyms
- Pterostichus prolixus (Broun, 1880); Trichosternus prolixus Broun, 1880

Species of beetle

Neoferonia prolixa is a species of ground beetle in the genus Neoferonia. It was first described by Thomas Broun in 1880 and is endemic to New Zealand.
