= Somatidia parvula =

Scientific classification
- Kingdom: Animalia
- Phylum: Arthropoda
- Class: Insecta
- Order: Coleoptera
- Suborder: Polyphaga
- Infraorder: Cucujiformia
- Family: Cerambycidae
- Genus: Somatidia
- Species: S. parvula

Binomial name
- Somatidia parvula Broun, 1917

Synonyms
- Somatidia longula Broun, 1921; Somatidia (Tenebrosoma) parvula Broun, 1917

Species of beetle

Somatidia parvula is a species of beetle in the family Cerambycidae. It was described by Broun in 1917.
