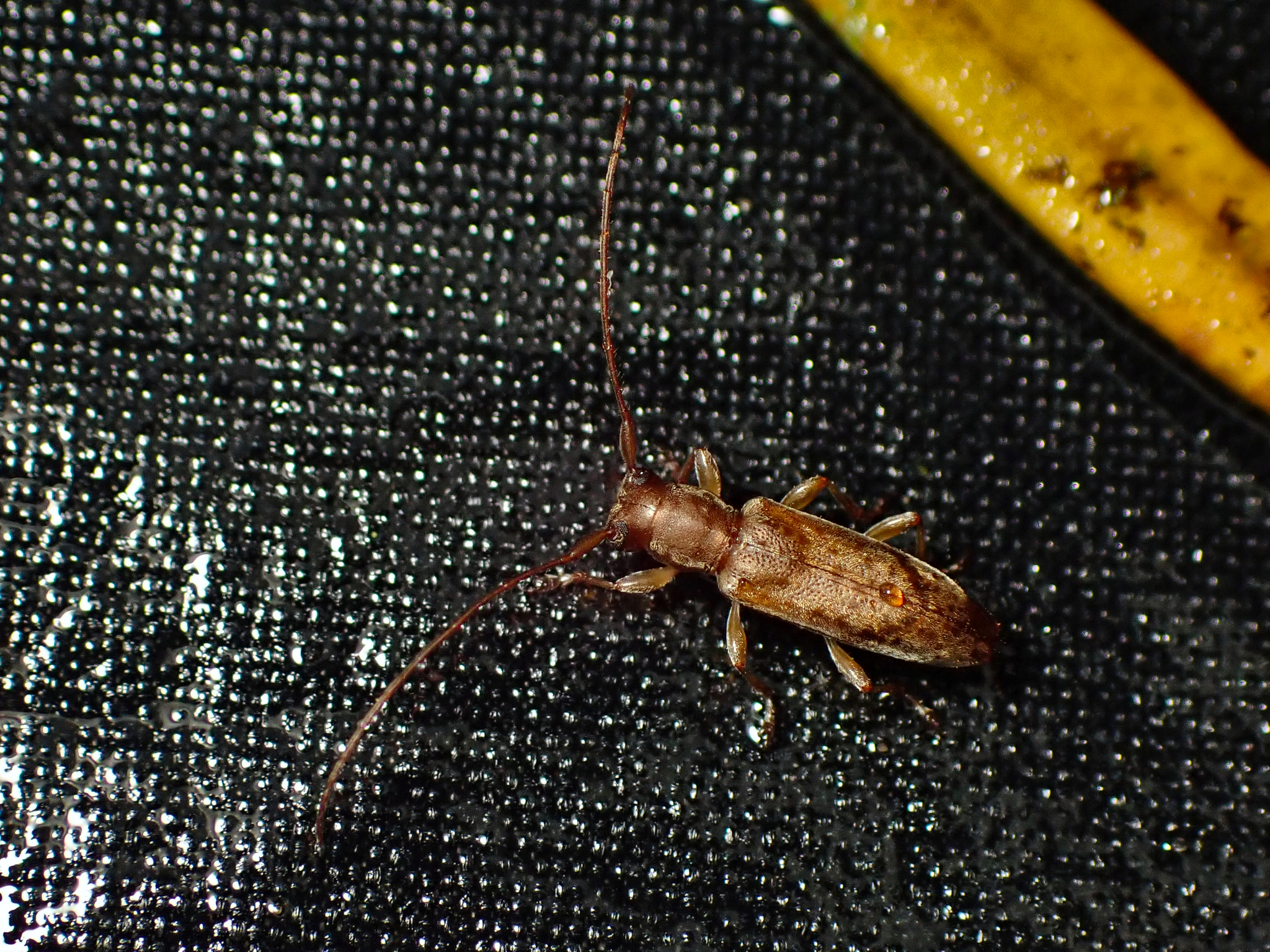
- Spilotrogia fragilis, New Zealand

Scientific classification
- Domain: Eukaryota
- Kingdom: Animalia
- Phylum: Arthropoda
- Class: Insecta
- Order: Coleoptera
- Suborder: Polyphaga
- Infraorder: Cucujiformia
- Family: Cerambycidae
- Subfamily: Lamiinae
- Tribe: Acanthocinini
- Genus: Spilotrogia; Bates, 1874

= Spilotrogia =

Genus of beetles

Spilotrogia is a genus of flat-faced longhorns in the beetle family Cerambycidae. There are at about six described species in Spilotrogia, found in New Zealand.

== Species ==
These six species belong to the genus Spilotrogia:

- Spilotrogia elongata (Broun, 1883)
- Spilotrogia fragilis (Bates, 1874)
- Spilotrogia hilarula Broun, 1880
- Spilotrogia maculata Bates, 1874
- Spilotrogia pictula (Bates, 1876)
- Spilotrogia pulchella (Bates, 1874)
