= Spilotrogia pulchella =

Scientific classification
- Domain: Eukaryota
- Kingdom: Animalia
- Phylum: Arthropoda
- Class: Insecta
- Order: Coleoptera
- Suborder: Polyphaga
- Infraorder: Cucujiformia
- Family: Cerambycidae
- Subfamily: Lamiinae
- Tribe: Acanthocinini
- Genus: Spilotrogia
- Species: S. pulchella

Binomial name
- Spilotrogia pulchella (Bates, 1874)

Synonyms
- Xylotoles pulchellus Bates, 1874; Xylotoles persimilis Breuning, 1940; Xylotoles fasciatus Sharp, 1886; Xylotoles germanus Sharp, 1886

Species of beetle

Spilotrogia pulchella is a species of longhorned beetle in the family Cerambycidae, found in New Zealand.
