= Somatidia pulchella =

Scientific classification
- Domain: Eukaryota
- Kingdom: Animalia
- Phylum: Arthropoda
- Class: Insecta
- Order: Coleoptera
- Suborder: Polyphaga
- Infraorder: Cucujiformia
- Family: Cerambycidae
- Genus: Somatidia
- Species: S. pulchella

Binomial name
- Somatidia pulchella Olliff, 1889

Synonyms
- Somatidia (Tenebrosoma) pulchella Olliff, 1889

Species of beetle

Somatidia pulchella is a species of beetle in the family Cerambycidae. It was described by Olliff in 1889. It is known from Australia.
