= Somatidia laevithorax =

Scientific classification
- Kingdom: Animalia
- Phylum: Arthropoda
- Class: Insecta
- Order: Coleoptera
- Suborder: Polyphaga
- Infraorder: Cucujiformia
- Family: Cerambycidae
- Genus: Somatidia
- Species: S. laevithorax

Binomial name
- Somatidia laevithorax Breuning, 1940

Synonyms
- Somatidia (Laevisoma) laevithorax Breuning, 1940

Species of beetle

Somatidia laevithorax is a species of beetle in the family Cerambycidae. It was described by Stephan von Breuning in 1940.
