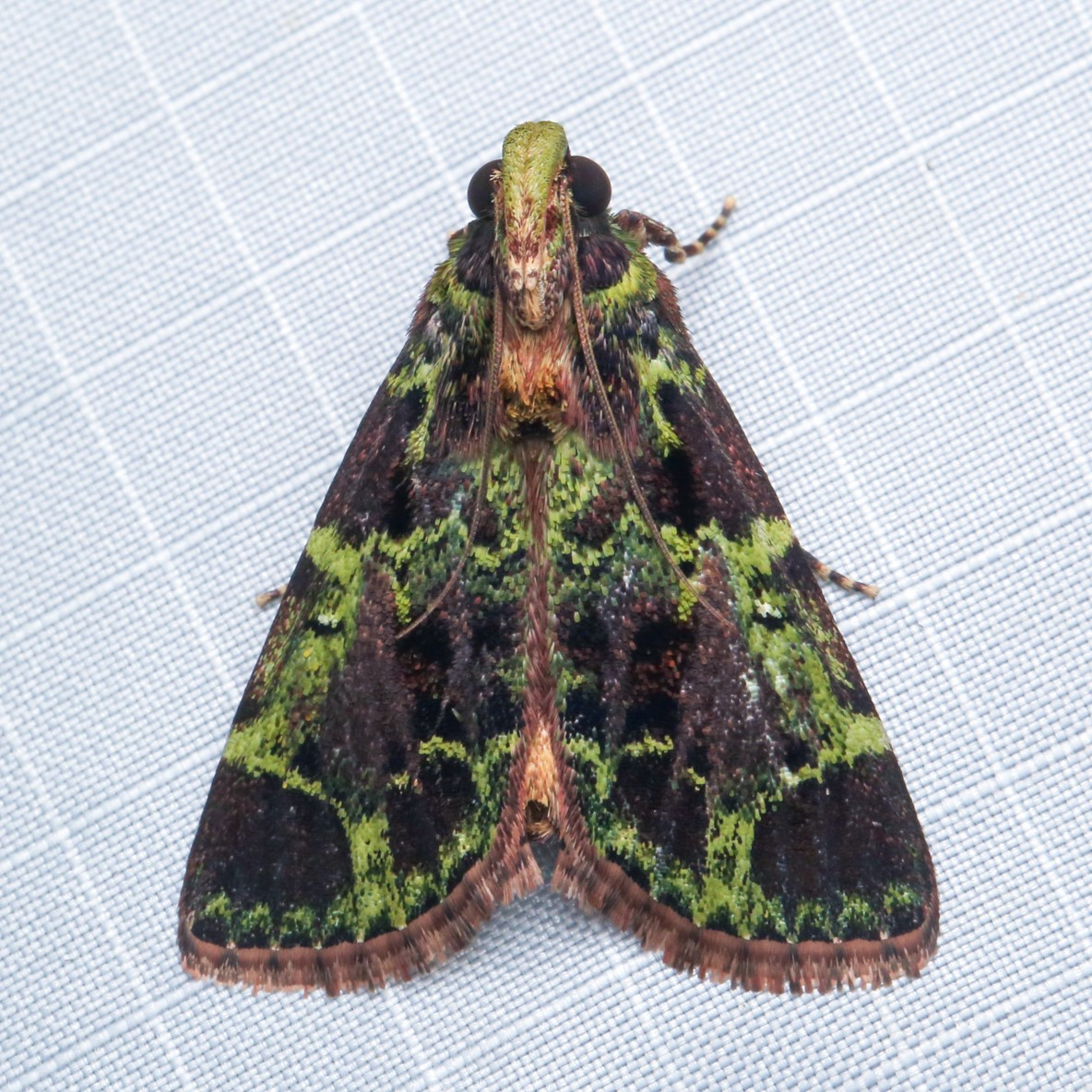

Scientific classification
- Kingdom: Animalia
- Phylum: Arthropoda
- Clade: Pancrustacea
- Class: Insecta
- Order: Lepidoptera
- Family: Pyralidae
- Genus: Stericta
- Species: S. divitalis

Binomial name
- Stericta divitalis Guenée, 1854

Synonyms
- Glossina divitalis Guenée, 1854

= Stericta divitalis =

Species of moth

Stericta divitalis is a species of moth in the family Pyralidae. It was first described by Achille Guenée in 1854 and is found in India and Sri Lanka.
