= Somatidia pernitida =

Scientific classification
- Domain: Eukaryota
- Kingdom: Animalia
- Phylum: Arthropoda
- Class: Insecta
- Order: Coleoptera
- Suborder: Polyphaga
- Infraorder: Cucujiformia
- Family: Cerambycidae
- Genus: Somatidia
- Species: S. pernitida

Binomial name
- Somatidia pernitida McKeown, 1940

Synonyms
- Somatidia nitida McKeown, 1938 nec Broun, 1880; Somatidia (Villososomatidia) pernitida McKeown, 1940

Species of beetle

Somatidia pernitida is a species of beetle in the family Cerambycidae. It was described by McKeown in 1940. It is known from Australia.
