= Somatidia helmsi =

Scientific classification
- Kingdom: Animalia
- Phylum: Arthropoda
- Class: Insecta
- Order: Coleoptera
- Suborder: Polyphaga
- Infraorder: Cucujiformia
- Family: Cerambycidae
- Genus: Somatidia
- Species: S. helmsi

Binomial name
- Somatidia helmsi Sharp, 1882

Synonyms
- Somatidia (Spinosoma) helmsi Sharp, 1882

Species of beetle

Somatidia helmsi is a species of beetle in the family Cerambycidae. It was described by David Sharp in 1882.
