= Somatidia aranea =

Scientific classification
- Domain: Eukaryota
- Kingdom: Animalia
- Phylum: Arthropoda
- Class: Insecta
- Order: Coleoptera
- Suborder: Polyphaga
- Infraorder: Cucujiformia
- Family: Cerambycidae
- Genus: Somatidia
- Species: S. aranea

Binomial name
- Somatidia aranea Olliff, 1889

Synonyms
- Somatidia (Araneosoma) aranea Olliff, 1889

Species of beetle

Somatidia aranea is a species of beetle in the family Cerambycidae. It was described by entomologist Arthur Sidney Olliff in 1889. It is known from Australia and New Zealand.
