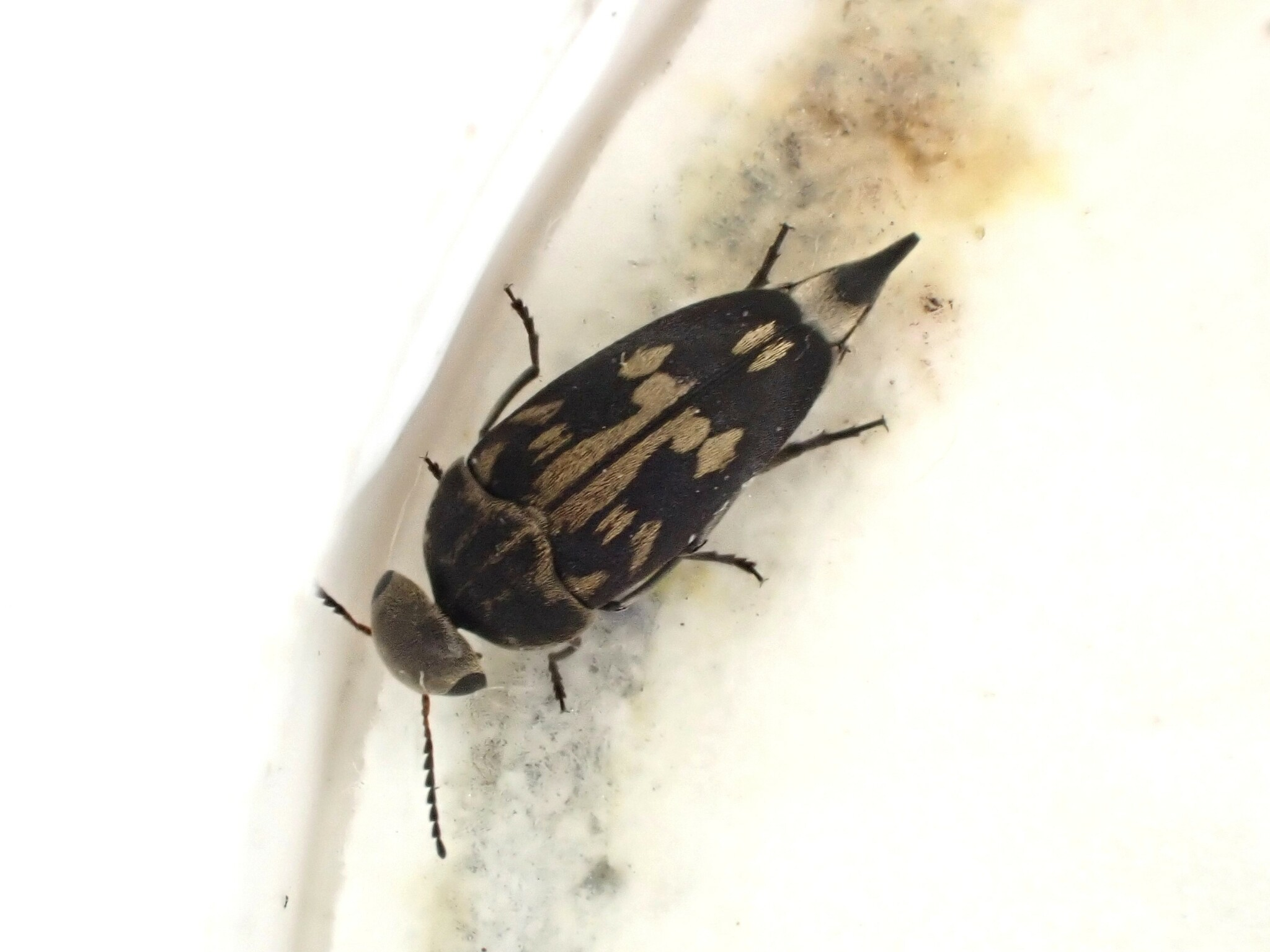
- Zeamordella monacha, New Zealand

Scientific classification
- Kingdom: Animalia
- Phylum: Arthropoda
- Class: Insecta
- Order: Coleoptera
- Suborder: Polyphaga
- Infraorder: Cucujiformia
- Family: Mordellidae
- Subfamily: Mordellinae
- Tribe: Mordellini
- Genus: Zeamordella; Broun, 1886
- Species: Z. monacha

Binomial name
- Zeamordella monacha Broun, 1886

= Zeamordella =

Genus of beetles

Zeamordella is a genus of tumbling flower beetles in the family Mordellidae. This genus has a single species, Zeamordella monacha, found in New Zealand and Australia.
