= Somatidia kaszabi =

Scientific classification
- Kingdom: Animalia
- Phylum: Arthropoda
- Class: Insecta
- Order: Coleoptera
- Suborder: Polyphaga
- Infraorder: Cucujiformia
- Family: Cerambycidae
- Genus: Somatidia
- Species: S. kaszabi

Binomial name
- Somatidia kaszabi Breuning, 1975

Synonyms
- Somatidia (Papusoma) kaszabi Breuning, 1975

Species of beetle

Somatidia kaszabi is a species of beetle in the family Cerambycidae. It was described by Stephan von Breuning in 1975.
