= Somatidia antarctica =

Scientific classification
- Domain: Eukaryota
- Kingdom: Animalia
- Phylum: Arthropoda
- Class: Insecta
- Order: Coleoptera
- Suborder: Polyphaga
- Infraorder: Cucujiformia
- Family: Cerambycidae
- Genus: Somatidia
- Species: S. antarctica

Binomial name
- Somatidia antarctica (White, 1846)

Synonyms
- Somatidia assimilata Broun, 1880; Parmena antarctica White, 1846

Species of beetle

Somatidia antarctica is a species of beetle in the family Cerambycidae. It was described by White in 1846, originally under the genus Parmena. It feeds on Dacrydium cupressinum.
