= Stericta rurealis =

Scientific classification
- Domain: Eukaryota
- Kingdom: Animalia
- Phylum: Arthropoda
- Class: Insecta
- Order: Lepidoptera
- Family: Pyralidae
- Genus: Stericta
- Species: S. rurealis

Binomial name
- Stericta rurealis Kenrick, 1912

Species of moth

Stericta rurealis is a species of moth of the family Pyralidae. It is found in New Guinea.
