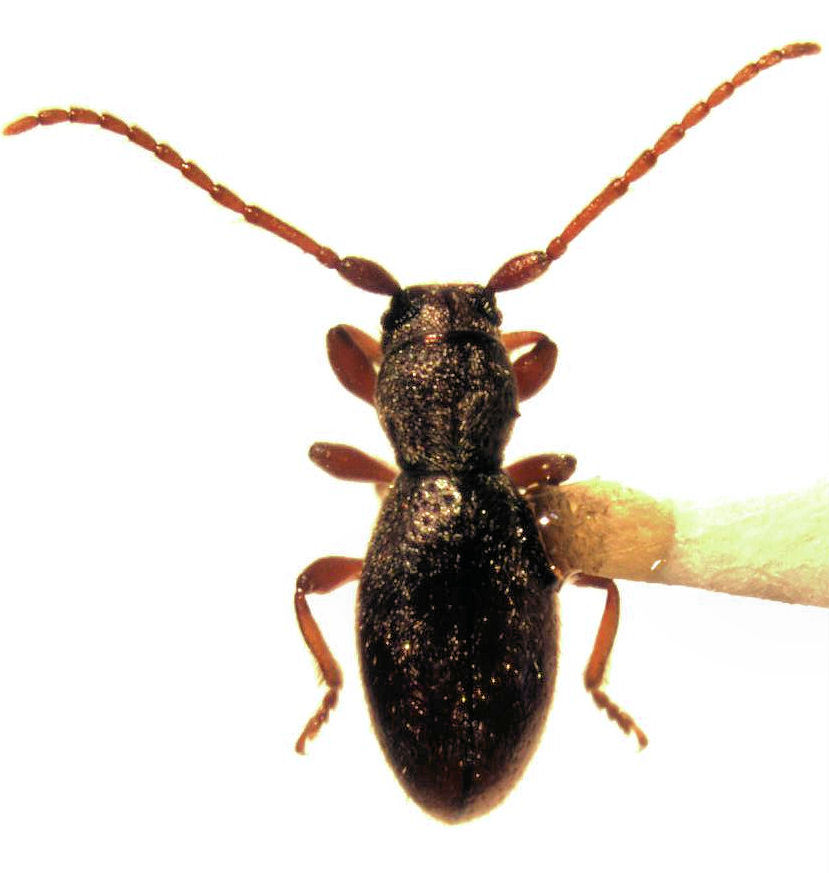
- Somatidia (Ptinosoma) n. sp.

Scientific classification
- Domain: Eukaryota
- Kingdom: Animalia
- Phylum: Arthropoda
- Class: Insecta
- Order: Coleoptera
- Suborder: Polyphaga
- Infraorder: Cucujiformia
- Family: Cerambycidae
- Tribe: Parmenini
- Genus: Somatidia; Thomson, 1864

Species
- See text

= Somatidia =

Genus of beetles

Somatidia is a genus of longhorn beetles of the subfamily Lamiinae, containing the following species:

== Species ==
subgenus Araneosoma

- Somatidia aranea Olliff, 1889

subgenus Dentosoma

- Somatidia fulvipes Broun, 1923
- Somatidia lineifera Broun, 1909
- Somatidia spinicollis Broun, 1893

subgenus Laevisoma

- Somatidia flavidorsis Broun, 1917
- Somatidia halli Broun, 1914
- Somatidia laevior Broun, 1893
- Somatidia laevithorax Breuning, 1940
- Somatidia maculata Broun, 1921
- Somatidia metallica Breuning, 1982
- Somatidia pinguis Broun, 1913
- Somatidia rufescens Breuning, 1940
- Somatidia suffusa Broun, 1917

subgenus Microsoma

- Somatidia fauveli Breuning, 1961

subgenus Nodulosoma

- Somatidia angusta Broun, 1880
- Somatidia costifer Broun, 1893
- Somatidia laevinotata Broun, 1917
- Somatidia nodularia Broun, 1913
- Somatidia picticornis Broun, 1895
- Somatidia posticalis Broun, 1913
- Somatidia spectabilis Broun, 1917
- Somatidia testacea Broun, 1909
- Somatidia websteriana Broun, 1909

subgenus Papusoma

- Somatidia kaszabi Breuning, 1975

subgenus Ptinosoma

- Somatidia ampliata Breuning, 1940
- Somatidia convexa Broun, 1893
- Somatidia latula Broun, 1893
- Somatidia pennulata Broun, 1921
- Somatidia ptinoides (Bates, 1874)
- Somatidia ruficornis Broun, 1914
- Somatidia waitei Broun, 1911

subgenus Somatidia

- Somatidia antarctica (White, 1846)
- Somatidia grandis Broun, 1895
- Somatidia longipes Sharp, 1878
- Somatidia simplex Broun, 1893

subgenus Spinosoma

- Somatidia helmsi Sharp, 1882

subgenus Tenebrosoma

- Somatidia albicoma Broun, 1893
- Somatidia corticola Broun, 1913
- Somatidia crassipes Broun, 1883
- Somatidia diversa Broun, 1880
- Somatidia nitida Broun, 1880
- Somatidia parvula Broun, 1917
- Somatidia pictipes Broun, 1880
- Somatidia pulchella Olliff, 1889
- Somatidia tenebrica Broun, 1893
- Somatidia terrestris Broun, 1880
- Somatidia testudo Broun, 1904

subgenus Villososomatidia

- Somatidia australiae Carter, 1926
- Somatidia capillosa Olliff, 1889
- Somatidia olliffi Lea, 1929
- Somatidia pernitida McKeown, 1940
- Somatidia tricolor Lea, 1929
- Somatidia villosa Lea, 1929
