= Somatidia tricolor =

Scientific classification
- Domain: Eukaryota
- Kingdom: Animalia
- Phylum: Arthropoda
- Class: Insecta
- Order: Coleoptera
- Suborder: Polyphaga
- Infraorder: Cucujiformia
- Family: Cerambycidae
- Genus: Somatidia
- Species: S. tricolor

Binomial name
- Somatidia tricolor Lea, 1929

Synonyms
- Somatidia (Villososomatidia) tricolor Lea, 1929

Species of beetle

Somatidia tricolor is a species of beetle in the family Cerambycidae. It was described by Lea in 1929. It is known from Australia.
