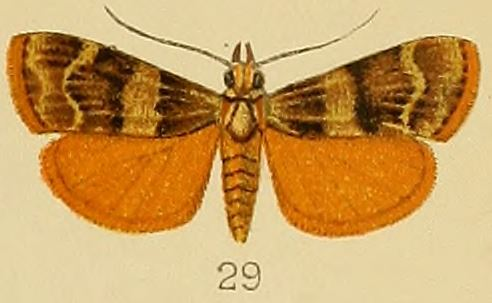

Scientific classification
- Domain: Eukaryota
- Kingdom: Animalia
- Phylum: Arthropoda
- Class: Insecta
- Order: Lepidoptera
- Family: Pyralidae
- Genus: Stericta
- Species: S. flammealis

Binomial name
- Stericta flammealis Kenrick, 1907

= Stericta flammealis =

Species of moth

Stericta flammealis is a species of moth of the family Pyralidae. It is found in Papua New Guinea.

It has a wingspan of 26 mm.
