= Somatidia ptinoides =

Scientific classification
- Domain: Eukaryota
- Kingdom: Animalia
- Phylum: Arthropoda
- Class: Insecta
- Order: Coleoptera
- Suborder: Polyphaga
- Infraorder: Cucujiformia
- Family: Cerambycidae
- Genus: Somatidia
- Species: S. ptinoides

Binomial name
- Somatidia ptinoides (Bates, 1874)

Synonyms
- Somatidia suturalis Broun, 1914; Somatidia proxima Broun, 1893; Ptinosoma ptinoides Bates, 1874

Species of beetle

Somatidia ptinoides is a species of beetle in the family Cerambycidae. It was described by Henry Walter Bates in 1874.

== Varietas ==
- Somatidia ptinoides var. rubella Broun, 1914
- Somatidia ptinoides var. heterarthra Broun, 1909
