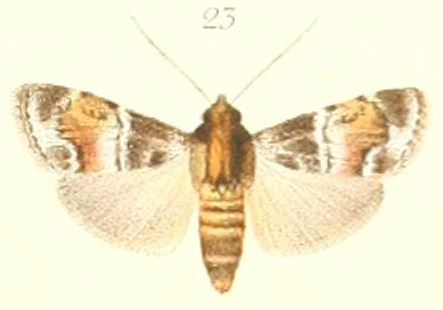

Scientific classification
- Domain: Eukaryota
- Kingdom: Animalia
- Phylum: Arthropoda
- Class: Insecta
- Order: Lepidoptera
- Family: Pyralidae
- Genus: Stericta
- Species: S. corticalis

Binomial name
- Stericta corticalis Pagenstecher, 1900

= Stericta corticalis =

Species of moth

Stericta corticalis is a species of moth of the family Pyralidae. It is found in Papua New Guinea.
