= Somatidia fauveli =

Scientific classification
- Kingdom: Animalia
- Phylum: Arthropoda
- Class: Insecta
- Order: Coleoptera
- Suborder: Polyphaga
- Infraorder: Cucujiformia
- Family: Cerambycidae
- Genus: Somatidia
- Species: S. fauveli

Binomial name
- Somatidia fauveli Breuning, 1961

Synonyms
- Microcleptes ptinoides Fauvel, 1906 nec Bates, 1874

Species of beetle

Somatidia fauveli is a species of beetle in the family Cerambycidae. It was described by Stephan von Breuning in 1961. It is known from New Caledonia.
