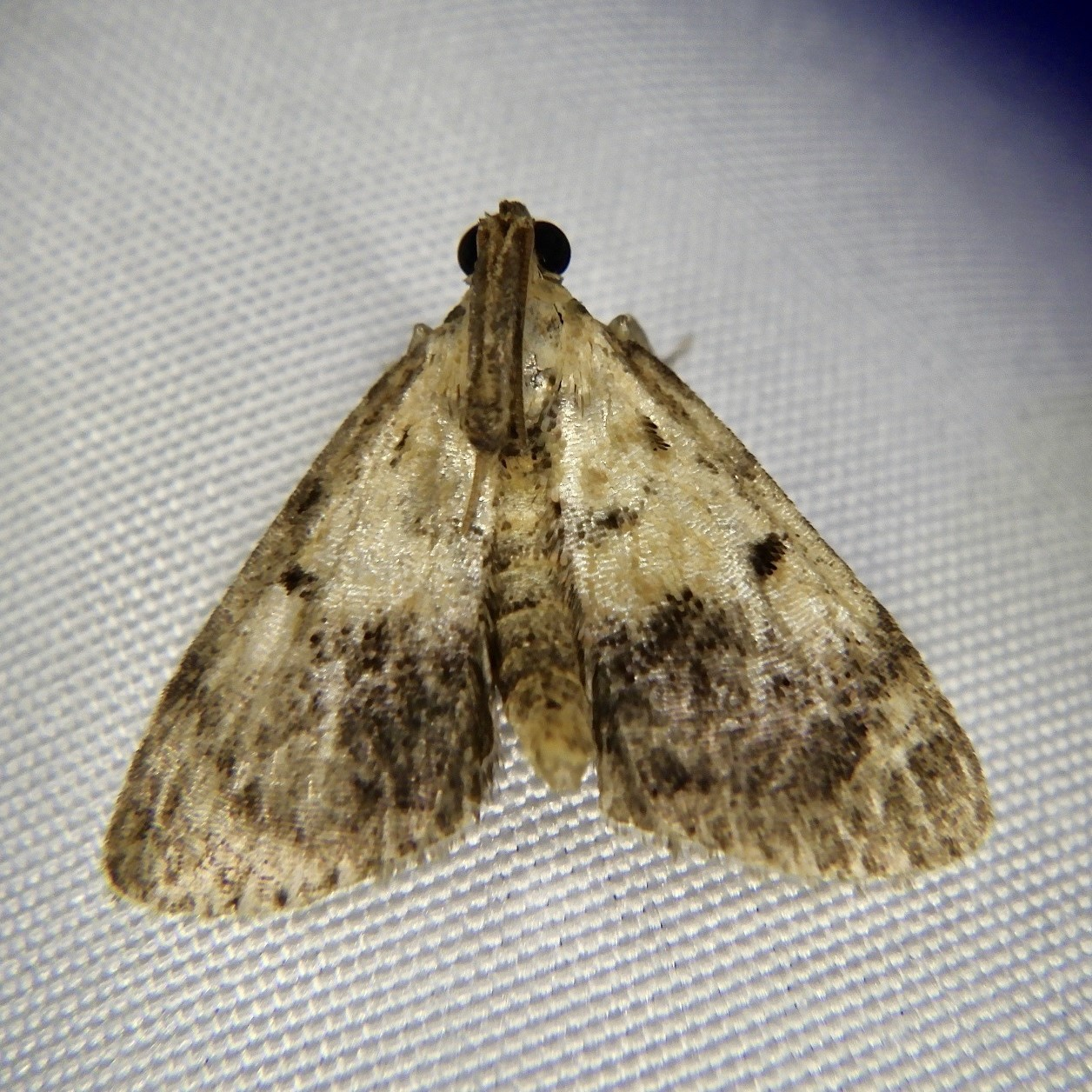

Scientific classification
- Kingdom: Animalia
- Phylum: Arthropoda
- Clade: Pancrustacea
- Class: Insecta
- Order: Lepidoptera
- Family: Pyralidae
- Genus: Stericta
- Species: S. kiiensis

Binomial name
- Stericta kiiensis (Marumo, 1921)

Synonyms
- Lepidogma kiiensis Marumo, 1921; Jocara kiiensis

= Stericta kiiensis =

Species of moth

Stericta kiiensis is a species of snout moth. It is found in Japan.

The wingspan is 18–21 mm.
