= Spilotrogia fragilis =

Scientific classification
- Kingdom: Animalia
- Phylum: Arthropoda
- Clade: Pancrustacea
- Class: Insecta
- Order: Coleoptera
- Suborder: Polyphaga
- Infraorder: Cucujiformia
- Family: Cerambycidae
- Genus: Spilotrogia
- Species: S. fragilis

Binomial name
- Spilotrogia fragilis (Bates, 1874)

Species of beetle

Spilotrogia fragilis is a species of beetle, endemic to New Zealand. The placement of the species in the taxonomy is uncertain, and the genus has been placed into Lamiinae incertae sedis for now. Specimens have been found on the Moire Reserve in the north of Auckland. It has also been found in Dacrycarpus dacrydioides forest and nearby pastures. Collections have been made on both the North and South Island. The species was previously placed in Stenellipsis.
