= Somatidia australiae =

Scientific classification
- Domain: Eukaryota
- Kingdom: Animalia
- Phylum: Arthropoda
- Class: Insecta
- Order: Coleoptera
- Suborder: Polyphaga
- Infraorder: Cucujiformia
- Family: Cerambycidae
- Genus: Somatidia
- Species: S. australiae

Binomial name
- Somatidia australiae Carter, 1926

Synonyms
- Somatidia (Villososomatidia) australiae Carter, 1926

Species of beetle

Somatidia australiae is a species of beetle in the family Cerambycidae. It was described by Carter in 1926. It is known from Australia.
