= Stericta rufescens =

Scientific classification
- Kingdom: Animalia
- Phylum: Arthropoda
- Class: Insecta
- Order: Lepidoptera
- Family: Pyralidae
- Genus: Stericta
- Species: S. rufescens

Binomial name
- Stericta rufescens Hampson, 1896

Synonyms
- Jocara rufescens

Species of moth

Stericta rufescens is a species of snout moth (family Pyralidae). It was first described by George Hampson in 1896. It is found in Bhutan.

The wingspan is about 24 mm. The forewings are dark red brown, with pale patches at the base of the costa and apex. The hindwings have a submarginal black spot and a pale patch at the anal angle.
