= Somatidia ampliata =

Scientific classification
- Kingdom: Animalia
- Phylum: Arthropoda
- Class: Insecta
- Order: Coleoptera
- Suborder: Polyphaga
- Infraorder: Cucujiformia
- Family: Cerambycidae
- Genus: Somatidia
- Species: S. ampliata

Binomial name
- Somatidia ampliata Breuning, 1940

Synonyms
- Somatidia (Ptinosoma) ampliata Breuning, 1940

Species of beetle

Somatidia ampliata is a species of beetle in the family Cerambycidae. It was described by Stephan von Breuning in 1940. It is known from New Zealand.
