= Mesolamia =

Scientific classification
- Domain: Eukaryota
- Kingdom: Animalia
- Phylum: Arthropoda
- Class: Insecta
- Order: Coleoptera
- Suborder: Polyphaga
- Infraorder: Cucujiformia
- Family: Cerambycidae
- Tribe: Desmiphorini
- Genus: Mesolamia

Genus of beetles

Mesolamia is a genus of longhorn beetles of the subfamily Lamiinae, containing the following species:

- Mesolamia aerata Broun, 1893
- Mesolamia marmorata Sharp, 1882
