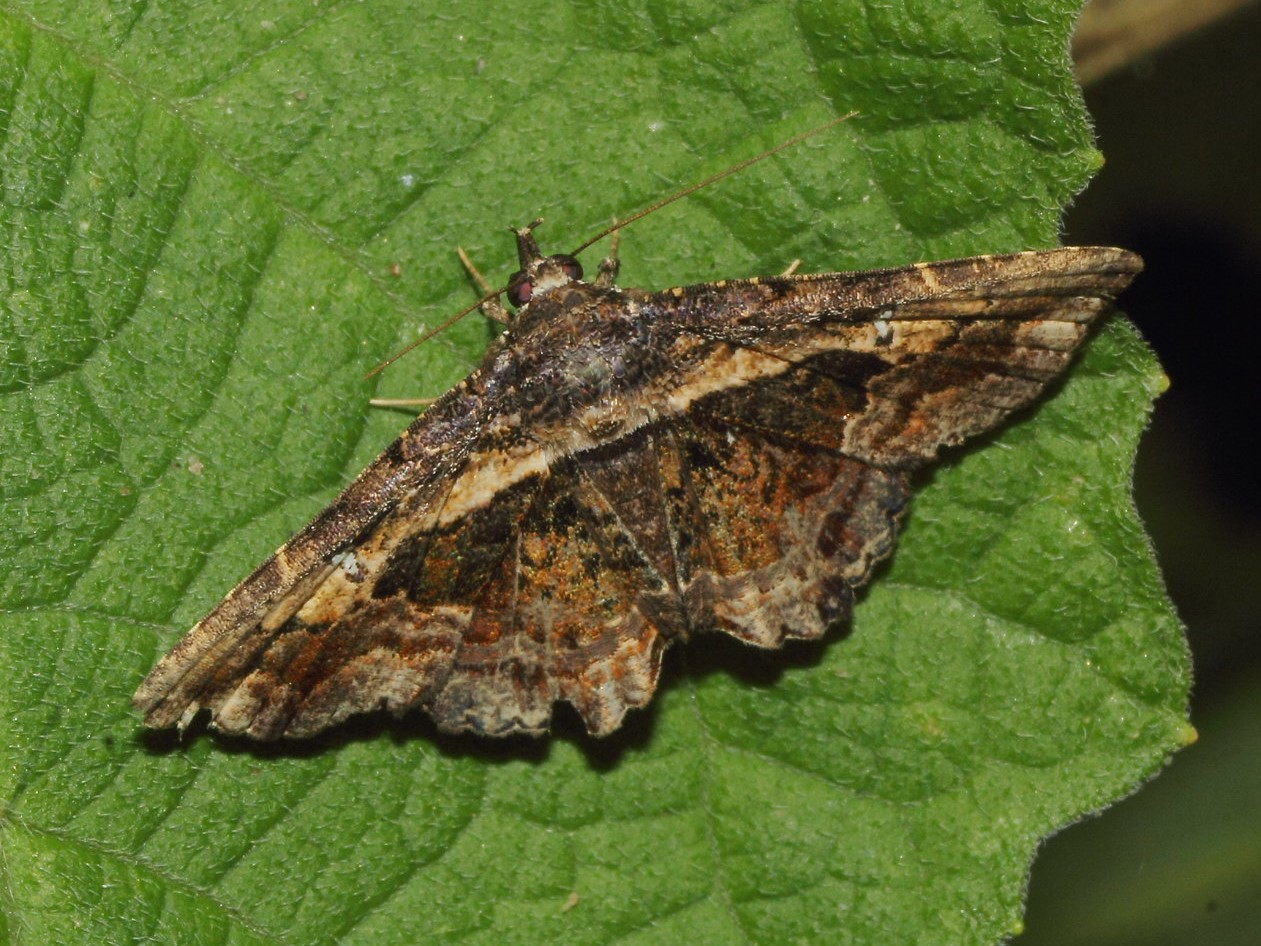

Scientific classification
- Kingdom: Animalia
- Phylum: Arthropoda
- Clade: Pancrustacea
- Class: Insecta
- Order: Lepidoptera
- Superfamily: Noctuoidea
- Family: Erebidae
- Genus: Helia
- Species: H. agna

Binomial name
- Helia agna (H. Druce, 1890)

= Helia agna =

Species of moth

Helia agna is a species of moth in the family Erebidae.
