= Neoferonia edax =

Scientific classification
- Kingdom: Animalia
- Phylum: Arthropoda
- Clade: Pancrustacea
- Class: Insecta
- Order: Coleoptera
- Suborder: Adephaga
- Family: Carabidae
- Genus: Neoferonia
- Species: N. edax

Binomial name
- Neoferonia edax Chaudior, 1878

Synonyms
- Feronia edax Chaudoir, 1878; Holcaspis edax (Chaudoir, 1878)

Species of beetle from New Zealand

Neoferonia edax is a species of ground beetle in the genus Neoferonia belonging to the family Carabidae. It is endemic to New Zealand.
