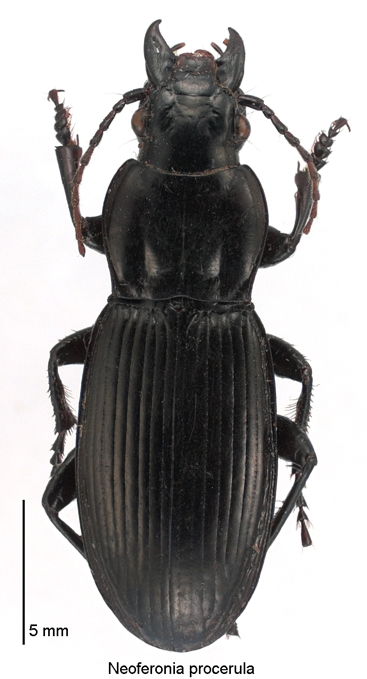
- Neoferonia procerula

Scientific classification
- Kingdom: Animalia
- Phylum: Arthropoda
- Clade: Pancrustacea
- Class: Insecta
- Order: Coleoptera
- Suborder: Adephaga
- Family: Carabidae
- Subfamily: Pterostichinae
- Tribe: Pterostichini
- Subtribe: Pterostichina
- Genus: Neoferonia; Britton, 1940

= Neoferonia =

Genus of beetles

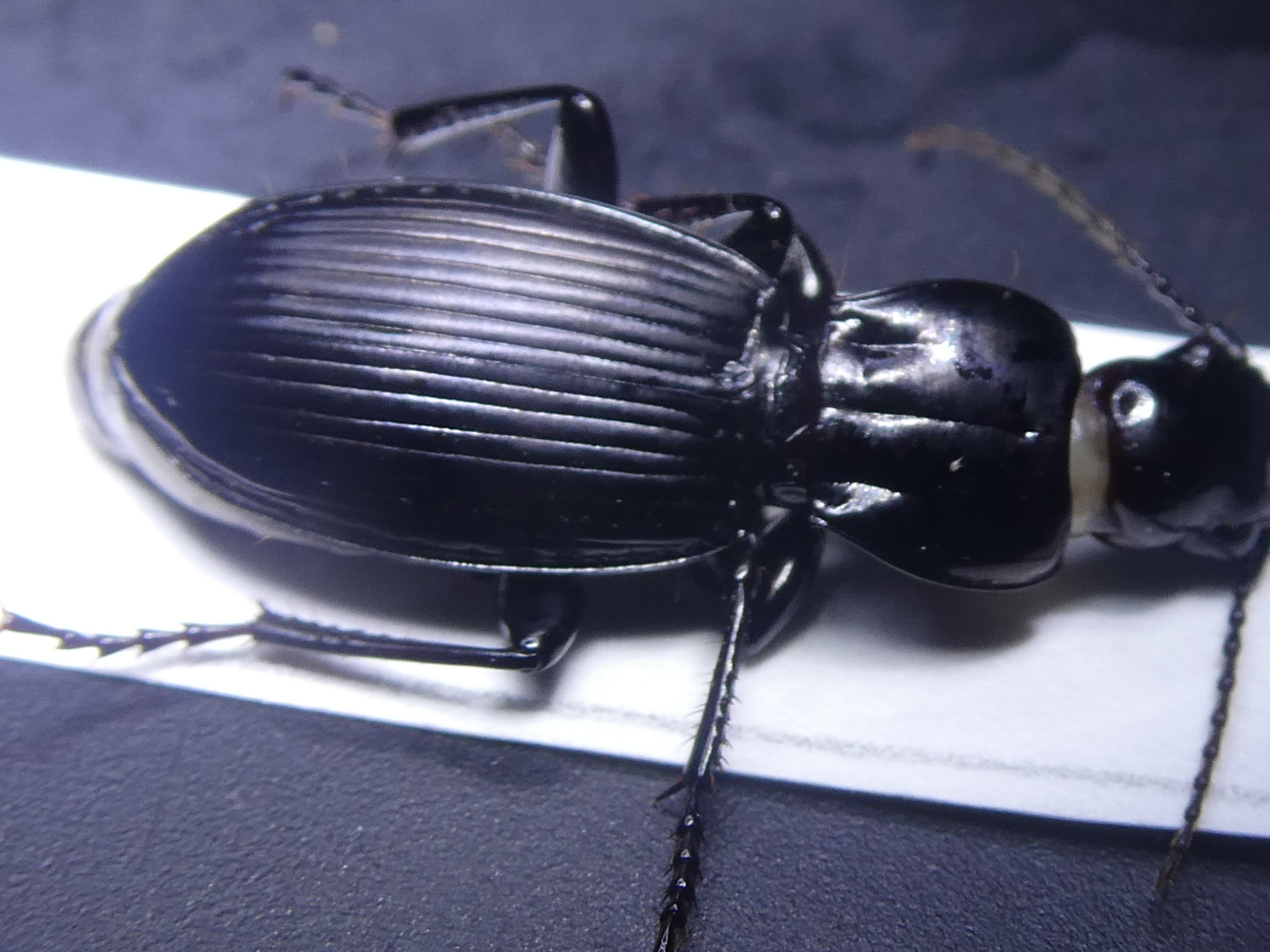
Neoferonia ardua, New Zealand

Neoferonia is a genus in the ground beetle family Carabidae. There are about nine described species in Neoferonia, which are all endemic to New Zealand.

== Species ==
These nine species belong to the genus Neoferonia:

- Neoferonia ardua (Broun, 1893)
- Neoferonia edax (Chaudoir, 1878)
- Neoferonia fossalis (Broun, 1914)
- Neoferonia integrata (Bates, 1878)
- Neoferonia prasignis (Broun, 1903)
- Neoferonia procerula (Broun, 1886)
- Neoferonia prolixa (Broun, 1880)
- Neoferonia straneoi Britton, 1940
- Neoferonia truncatula (Broun, 1923)
