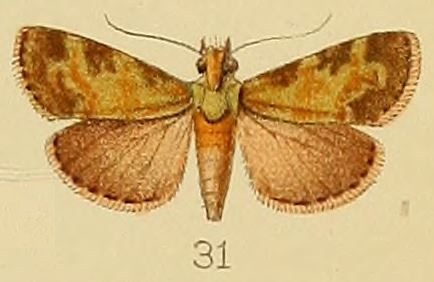

Scientific classification
- Domain: Eukaryota
- Kingdom: Animalia
- Phylum: Arthropoda
- Class: Insecta
- Order: Lepidoptera
- Family: Pyralidae
- Genus: Stericta
- Species: S. subviridalis

Binomial name
- Stericta subviridalis Kenrick, 1912

= Stericta subviridalis =

Species of moth

Stericta subviridalis is a species of moth of the family Pyralidae. It is found in Papua New Guinea.

It has a wingspan of 28 mm.
