= Mesolamia marmorata =

Scientific classification
- Kingdom: Animalia
- Phylum: Arthropoda
- Class: Insecta
- Order: Coleoptera
- Suborder: Polyphaga
- Infraorder: Cucujiformia
- Family: Cerambycidae
- Genus: Mesolamia
- Species: M. marmorata

Binomial name
- Mesolamia marmorata Sharp, 1882

Species of beetle

Mesolamia marmorata is a species of beetle in the family Cerambycidae. It was described by Sharp in 1882. It is known from New Zealand.
