= Brenda May =

New Zealand entomologist (1917–1998)

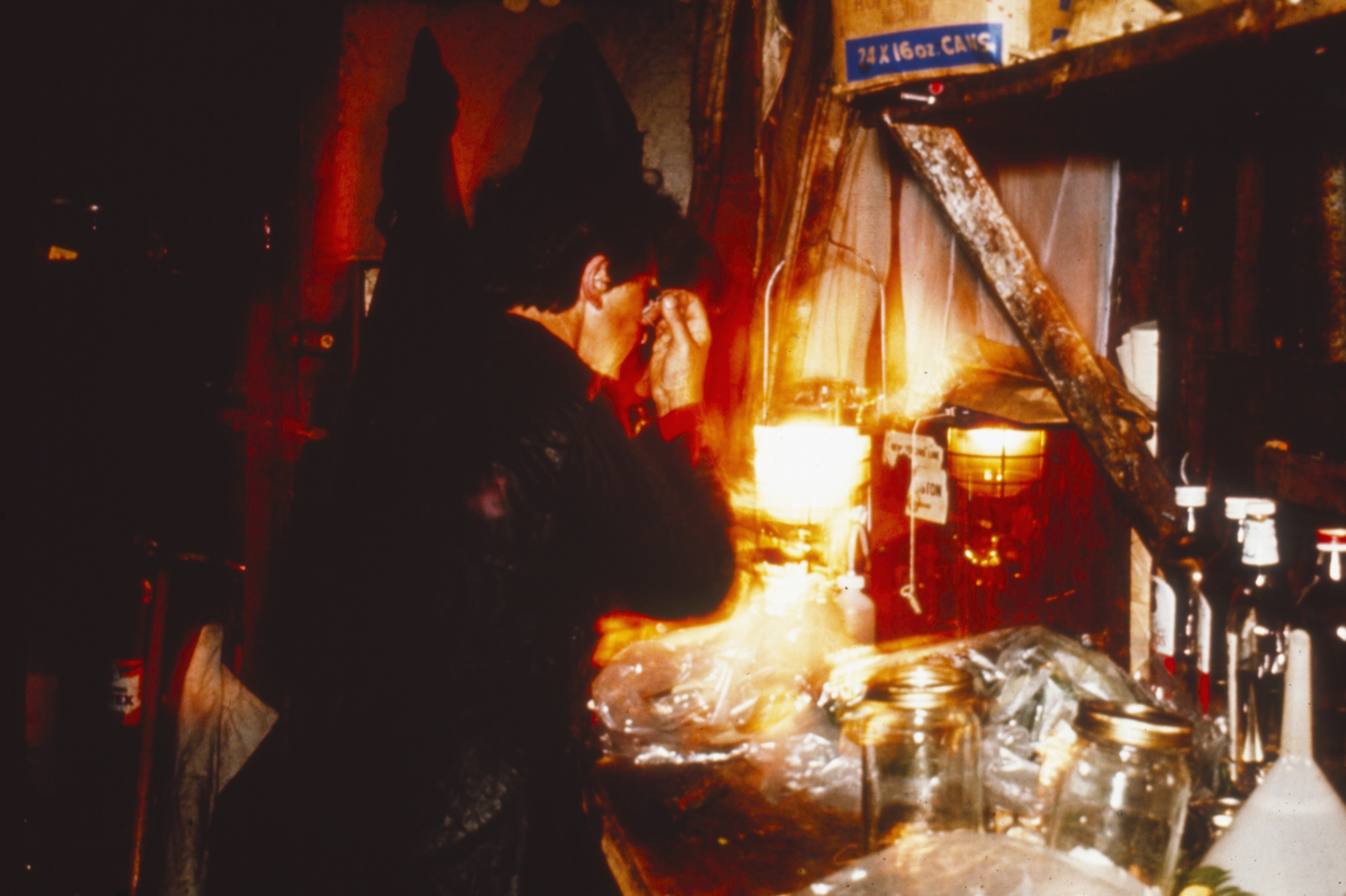
- Born: Brenda Mabel Dansie; February 17, 1917; Essex, United Kingdom
- Died: October 7, 1998 (aged 81); Auckland, New Zealand
- Scientific career
- Fields: Entomology
- Workplaces: DSIR; Landcare Research

Brenda Mabel May (née Dansie; 17 February 1917 – 7 October 1998) was a New Zealand speleological entomologist known for her contributions to the understanding of weevil larvae biology. Between 1956 and 1980, she worked in the Entomology Division of the Department of Scientific and Industrial Research (DSIR). Afterwards, she became a research associate at Landcare Research, where she completed a systematic overview of New Zealand Curculionoidea, published in 1993. In 1998, May was elected as a Fellow of the Entomological Society of New Zealand in recognition of her contributions.

== Selected works ==
- May, Brenda M. (1966). "Identification of the immature forms of some common soil-inhabiting weevils, with notes on their biology". New Zealand Journal of Agricultural Research. 9 (2): 286–316. Bibcode:1966NZJAR...9..286M. doi:10.1080/00288233.1966.10420782.
- May, Brenda M. (1977). "Immature stages of Curculionidae: Larvae of the soil-dwelling weevils of New Zealand". Journal of the Royal Society of New Zealand. 7 (2): 189–228. Bibcode:1977JRSNZ...7..189M. doi:10.1080/03036758.1977.10427160.
- May, Brenda M. (1993). Larvae of Curculionoidea (Insecta: Coleoptera): a systematic overview. Lincoln, New Zealand: Manaaki Whenua Press. ISBN 0478045050.
