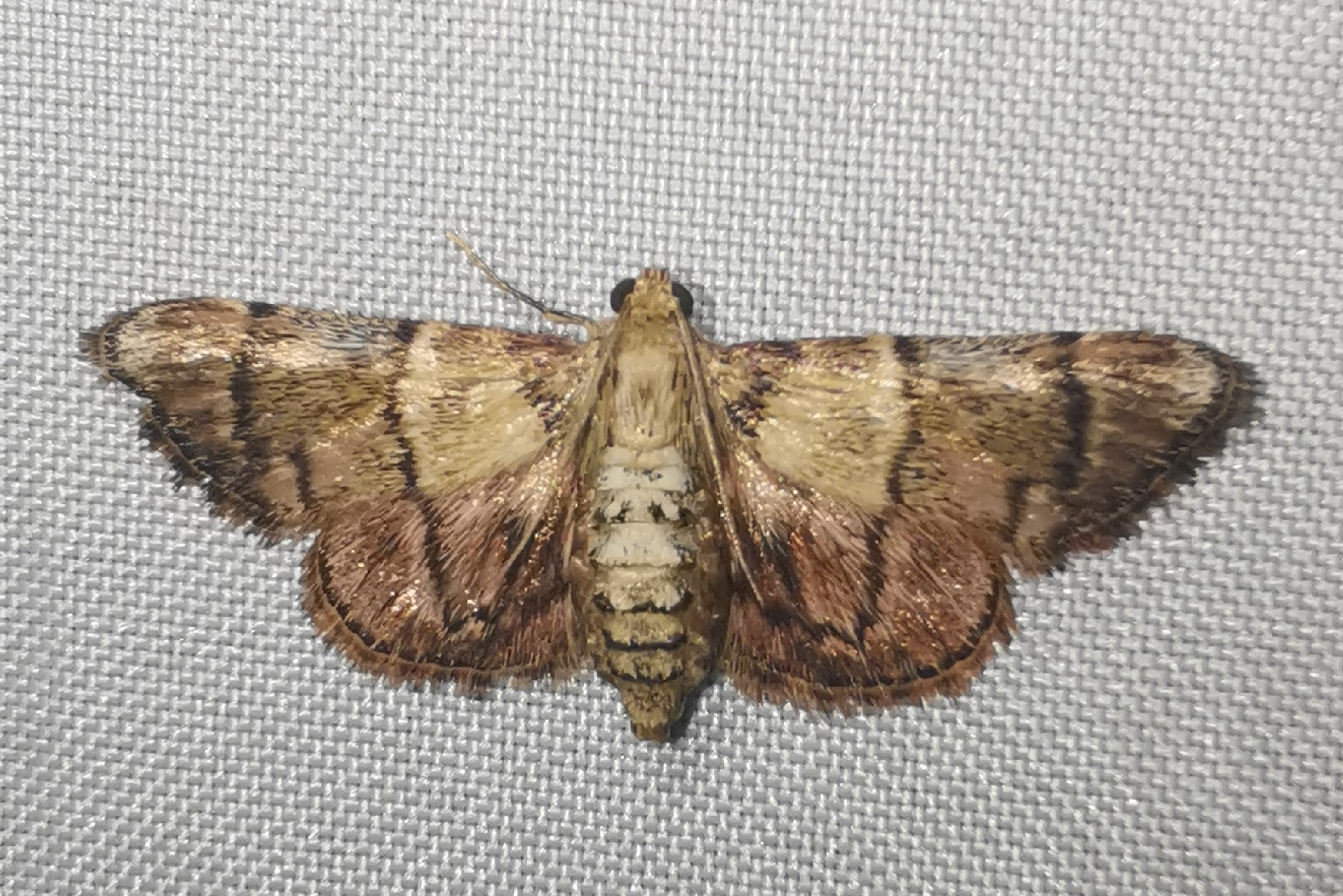
- Stericta angulosa

Scientific classification
- Kingdom: Animalia
- Phylum: Arthropoda
- Clade: Pancrustacea
- Class: Insecta
- Order: Lepidoptera
- Family: Pyralidae
- Subfamily: Epipaschiinae
- Genus: Stericta; Lederer, 1863

Synonyms
- Glossina Guenée, 1854; Matalia Walker, 1866; Oncobela Turner, 1937; Phialia Walker, 1866; Pseudocera Walker, 1863

= Stericta =

Genus of moths

Stericta is a genus of snout moths. It was erected by Julius Lederer in 1863.

== Species ==
- Stericta aeruginosa T. P. Lucas, 1894
- Stericta angulosa de Joannis, 1929
- Stericta angusta (Inoue, 1988)
- Stericta angustalis Caradja, 1925
- Stericta asopialis (Snellen, 1890)
- Stericta atribasalis Warren, 1895
- Stericta basalis (South, 1901)
- Stericta basilaris de Joannis, 1930
- Stericta bryomima (Turner, 1913)
- Stericta callibrya Meyrick, 1933
- Stericta caradjai West, 1931
- Stericta carbonalis (Guenée, 1854)
- Stericta carneotincta Hampson, 1896
- Stericta centralis (Wileman-South, 1917)
- Stericta chlorophoena (Turner, 1937)
- Stericta concisella (Walker, 1866)
- Stericta congenitalis Hampson, 1906
- Stericta corticalis Pagenstecher, 1900
- Stericta divitalis (Guenée, 1854)
- Stericta dochmoscia (Turner, 1905)
- Stericta dohrni E. Hering, 1901
- Stericta evanescens Butler, 1887
- Stericta flammealis Kenrick, 1907
- Stericta flavopuncta Inoue & Sasaki, 1995
- Stericta gelechiella (Walker, 1866)
- Stericta hoenei Caradja & Meyrick, 1935
- Stericta inconcisa Walker, 1863
- Stericta ignebasalis Hampson, 1916
- Stericta indistincta Rothschild, 1915
- Stericta jucundalis Walker, [1866]
- Stericta kiiensis (Marumo, 1920)
- Stericta kogii Inoue & Sasaki, 1995
- Stericta lactealis Caradja, 1931
- Stericta leucozonalis Hampson, 1906
- Stericta lophocepsalis Hampson, 1906
- Stericta loxochlaena Meyrick, 1938
- Stericta mediovialis Hampson, 1916
- Stericta olivialis Hampson, 1903
- Stericta orchidivora (Turner, 1904)
- Stericta phanerostola Hampson, 1916
- Stericta philobrya (Turner, 1937)
- Stericta plumbifloccalis Hampson, 1896
- Stericta prasina Warren, 1895
- Stericta rufescens Hampson, 1896
- Stericta rurealis Kenrick, 1912
- Stericta sectilis Hering, 1901
- Stericta sinuosa (Moore, 1888)
- Stericta subviridalis Kenrick, 1907
