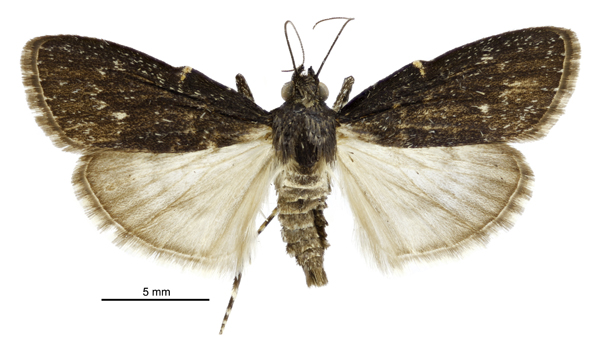

Scientific classification
- Kingdom: Animalia
- Phylum: Arthropoda
- Clade: Pancrustacea
- Class: Insecta
- Order: Lepidoptera
- Family: Pyralidae
- Genus: Stericta
- Species: S. carbonalis

Binomial name
- Stericta carbonalis (Guenée, 1854)

= Stericta carbonalis =

Species of Moth

Stericta carbonalis (formerly known as Helia carbonalis).. is a moth native to Australia, found in Queensland, New South Wales, Victoria, Tasmania, and Western Australia. It has recently also been established in New Zealand, first recorded in 2009 on Banks Peninsula.

== Description ==
Stericta carbonalis is a moth with a dark brown or grey pattern on its forewings, the hindwings are lighter with a white colour that darkens towards the edges. the adults of this species have dark coloured wings that blend in with the burnt bark of the eucalypt trees. The adults of this species has a curved or 'snub-nosed' head which is common for grass moths.

== Distribution ==
The distribution of this species ranges from Cairns, Queensland, Victoria, New South Wales, and Tasmania. This species has recently established in New Zealand with the earliest recording in 2009, with many records of the species in New Zealand since then, mostly from the South Island, but at least 3 records of the species have been made in the North Island

== Life cycle ==
Stericta carbonalis is part of the Pyralidae family, which have mobile pupa. It feeds on dead eucalypt leaves. The adult is a grass moth that visits flowers and has a nocturnal circadian rhythm
