= Stericta angusta =

Scientific classification
- Kingdom: Animalia
- Phylum: Arthropoda
- Class: Insecta
- Order: Lepidoptera
- Family: Pyralidae
- Genus: Stericta
- Species: S. angusta

Binomial name
- Stericta angusta (Inoue, 1988)

Synonyms
- Jocara angusta Inoue, 1988; Lepidogma angusta

Species of moth

Stericta angusta is a species of snout moth. It is found in Japan., Stericta angusta are also known to have wingspans of 18-20mm in length. Their head is covered in brownish orange scales.
