= Thomas Broun =

New Zealand entomologist (1838–1919)

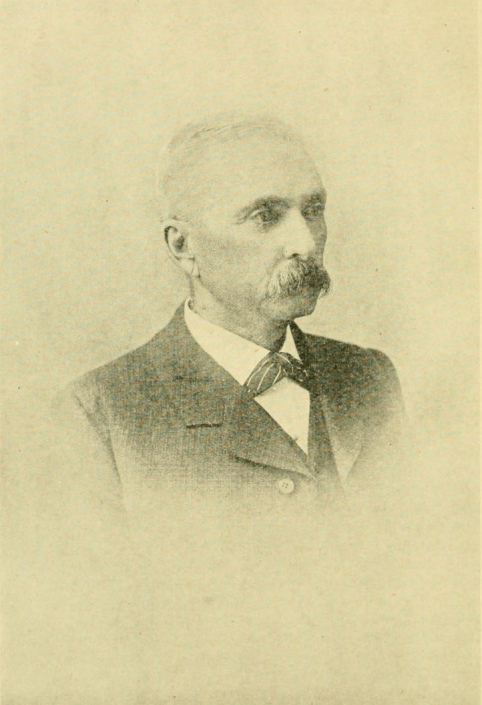
- Born: Thomas Brown; 15 July 1838; Edinburgh, Scotland
- Died: 24 August 1919 (aged 81); Auckland, New Zealand
- Resting place: Waikumete Cemetery, Auckland
- Military career
- Allegiance: United Kingdom; New Zealand
- Service years: c. 1854–1862 (British Army); 1863–1866 (New Zealand militia)
- Rank: Lieutenant (British Army); Major (New Zealand militia)
- Units: 35th (Sussex) Regiment of Foot; 1st Battalion, Waikato Militia
- Wars: Crimean War; Indian Rebellion of 1857; Second Taranaki War
- Awards: Indian Mutiny Medal; New Zealand War Medal; Légion d'honneur

Thomas Broun (né Brown; 15 July 1838 – 24 August 1919) was a Scottish-born soldier, farmer, teacher and entomologist, who spent much of his career in New Zealand. He is known for his study of the beetles (Coleoptera) of New Zealand.

Broun was born in an upper-class Edinburgh family, and appears to have received his education entirely from a private tutor. He served from around the age of sixteen as an officer in the British militia and army, first in the Forfar Militia Artillery and, from 1856, in the 35th (Sussex) Regiment of Foot. He fought in the Crimean War and was subsequently posted to Burma, where he began his interest in entomology. He saw further combat in the Indian Rebellion of 1857, but was invalided out of the army in 1862, at the age of twenty-four, after a near-fatal bout of cholera. He emigrated to New Zealand in 1863, where he gained a commission in the Waikato Militia and commanded troops during the Second Taranaki War.

Upon leaving military service in 1866, Broun attempted to establish himself as a farmer, though legal troubles forced him into bankruptcy the following year. He presented his first entomological paper in 1875, became a teacher in 1876 and worked in various schools around Auckland until 1888. His most significant scientific work, the Manual of the New Zealand Coleoptera, was published in seven volumes from 1880, though he remained an amateur until the 1890s, when he was appointed as a government entomologist and as an inspector of imported fruits. He died on 24 August 1919 in Auckland.

Broun has been credited among the most prolific identifiers of New Zealand's beetles, and as one of the most important figures in their study. Over the course of his career, he made identifications of 4,323 species, of which 3,538 were previously unknown to science. However, his documentation of his work was poor, and many of the species he identified were in fact synonyms of each other, leading to what has been termed the "Broun effect", by which estimates of the number of beetle species in New Zealand have been substantially overestimated.

== Biography ==
=== Early life and military career ===
Thomas Broun (Note: Broun's birth name was "Brown", and he was listed under this name in the record of his commission in the London Gazette, but he was generally known as "Broun".) was born into an aristocratic family in Edinburgh, Midlothian, Scotland, on 15 July 1838. He was the son of John Brown, a soldier, artist and respected naturalist, and Brown's wife Margaret Stewart. (Note: Crosby 1996. For John Brown's artistry, see The New Zealand Herald, 25 August 1919, p. 8.) John Brown's brother, Thomas, was a captain in the British Army and also known as a naturalist.

Broun was educated by a private tutor in Edinburgh, which appears to have been the only formal education he received. He joined the Forfar Militia Artillery around 1854; (Note: Crosby says he joined the army in 1854, but gives his first unit as the 35th Regiment. Broun's obituary written by Thomas Cheeseman says that he joined the army at sixteen; he turned sixteen in 1854.) on 8 July 1856, at which point he held the rank of first lieutenant, he transferred without purchase as an ensign to the regular army's 35th (Sussex) Regiment of Foot, which was engaged in the Crimean War. (Note: For the transfer and Broun's rank, see The London Gazette, 8 July 1856, p. 2379. On the date of his militia service, see Bairstow 2005) After the end of the war in 1856, the regiment was deployed to Burma, where Broun took an interest in the region's brightly-coloured tropical insects and began to collect specimens to send to the British Museum in London.

In May 1857, (Note: Bairstow 2005; see also Trimen 1876, p. 142) the regiment moved to Calcutta as a result of the Indian rebellion against British rule. Broun fought in the sieges of Lucknow and Delhi, and is believed to have assisted in the defence of the French colony of Pondicherry; he was awarded the French Légion d'honneur in 1917, and maintained that this was in recognition of his service at Pondicherry. He served in India until the end of the rebellion in November 1858, and was awarded the Indian Mutiny Medal. He was promoted to lieutenant on 17 March 1861, and was nearly killed by a bout of cholera late in the same year; he returned to Britain and was invalided out of the army in 1862. His retirement at the rank of lieutenant was reported in The London Gazette as effective on 3 October 1862.

Broun married Anne Shepherd, an educated woman interested in languages, music, birds and other animals, on 26 March 1863. (Note: Crosby gives the date as 1862.) They had six daughters together. The couple emigrated to New Zealand in 1863. Broun had obtained letters of introduction from the Duke of Hamilton, a Scottish aristocrat, to George Grey, the governor of New Zealand; Grey gave him a commission as a captain in the 1st Battalion of the Waikato Militia, which was being formed to fight in the Second Taranaki War. During the war, he was stationed in South Auckland, Waikato and the Bay of Plenty, and was placed in command of several redoubts. These included Alexandra Redoubt at Tuakau, where he was in command during late 1862; he later commanded another redoubt at Cambridge and Judea Redoubt at Tauranga. Broun was later awarded the New Zealand War Medal, in 1916, for having served in combat.

=== Post-war career ===
Broun left the militia on 4 December 1866, after the conclusion of hostilities, and established a farm at Ōpōtiki on New Zealand's North Island. His military service entitled him to a grant of land from the Crown: however, he was falsely accused of embezzling money from four private soldiers during his military service, which meant that his grant was withheld; the allegations were dismissed late in 1867, but Broun had already been forced to declare bankruptcy earlier in that year. On the advice of Theodore Haultain, New Zealand's Defence Minister, Broun took a job in 1876 as a teacher in Tairua on the Coromandel Peninsula, which became one of his favourite locations to collect specimens. He remained in the profession until 1888, working at Whangārei Heads, Kawau Island and Howick, a suburb of Auckland.

Broun began his amateur entomological work in New Zealand shortly after his departure from the army, and presented his first academic paper to the Auckland Institute in 1875. His collecting activity intensified after 1876, when he began teaching in Tairua: he started sending specimens to the entomologist David Sharp in London for description. (Note: & Watt 1977, p. 83. On Sharp, see Lucas 1922.) Broun had his daughters assist him in sorting the specimens he collected. His work was concerned almost entirely with beetles, known scientifically as Coleoptera. In 1878, he moved to Parua Bay on the northern side of Whangarei Harbour, where he began to prepare the first volume of his Manual of the New Zealand Coleoptera; it was published in 1880 via the Colonial Museum and Geological Survey of Wellington. The volume contained information on 1,140 new species, many previously unknown to science. He bought farmland near Drury in South Auckland, in 1889, and commissioned the architect John Stoupe to build a house there, which Broun called by the Māori name Nga Oki ('The Oaks') after the trees he had planted there.

In 1890, he was appointed as New Zealand's Government Entomologist. Around 1894, he was hired as an entomologist by the Department of Agriculture, working in Auckland, (Note: The period of his service as Government Entomologist is unclear: Cheeseman's obituary says that he was appointed in 1890 and served "for several years", while Ross Galbreath's history of the position says that Broun was employed "briefly" in 1894.) and from 1896 was an inspector and later the chief inspector of imported fruit there. (Note: Sources disagree on the dates of these appointments: Hutchinson says that he held both titles from 1894 until 1905.) He was promoted to major in 1905, and became commandant and vice president of the Auckland branch of the Empire Veterans' Association. He was awarded a unique gold issue of the Empire Veteran Cross, a medal of the Association. The later years of his life are unclear: he moved in either 1907 or 1908, either to Mount Eden or Mount Albert (both in the Auckland area); according to his biographer Basil Hutchinson, he sold Nga Oki in 1911. Broun died in Auckland on 24 August 1919 and was buried in Waikumete Cemetery. His final paper was published posthumously in 1923.

== Impact upon entomology ==
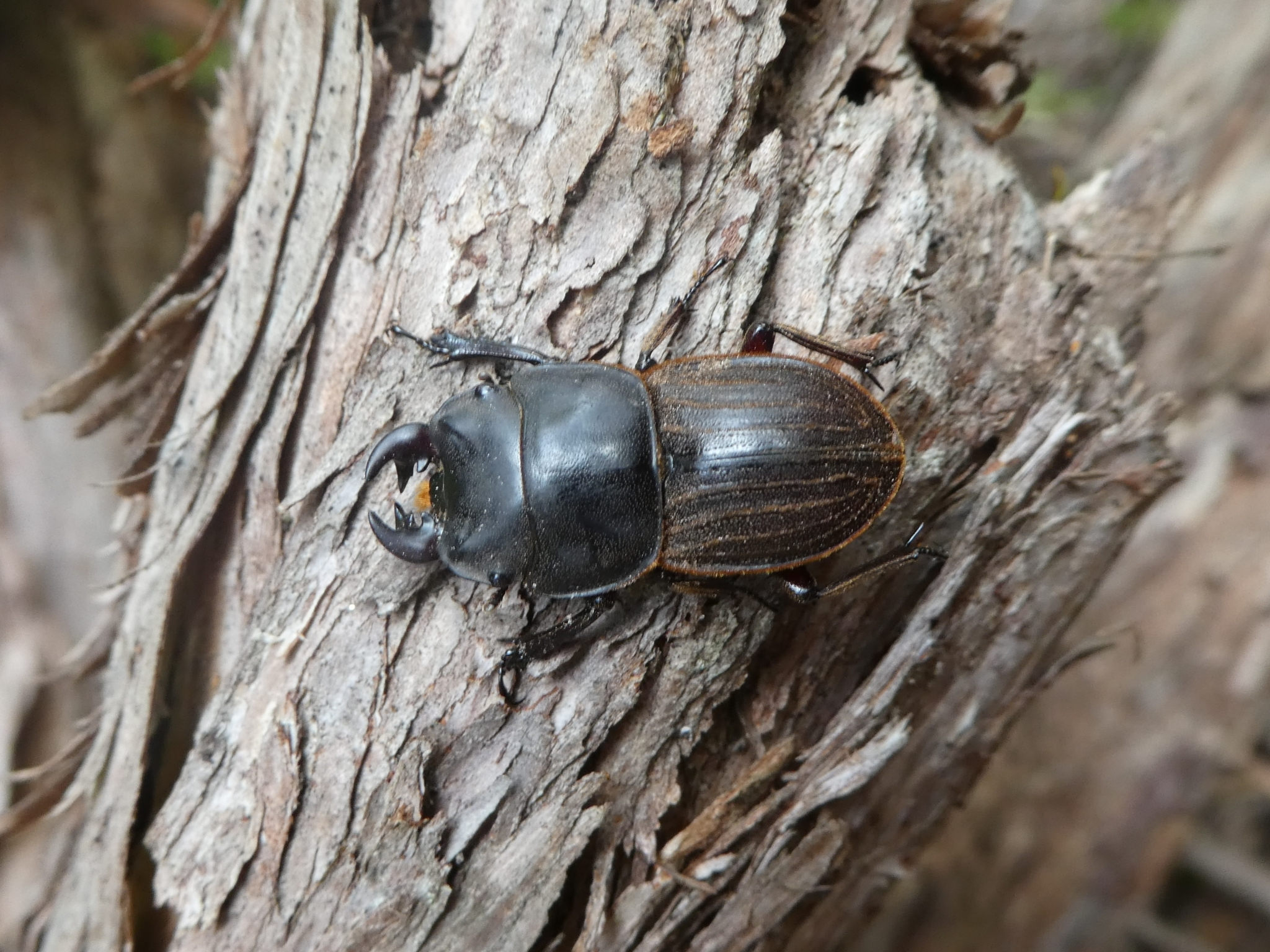
Geodorcus helmsi, first discovered by David Sharp in 1881 but erroneously labelled as a new species, Lissotes aemulus, by Broun in 1893

In total, the seven volumes of Broun's Manual of the New Zealand Coleoptera listed 2592 species, many of which Broun was the first to describe. His scientific work also included papers on the life cycles of insects, as well as the discovery of species of fungus and insect which removed pests from trees. In the course of his scientific work, he recorded 4,323 species, of which 3,538 had not previously been described in scientific literature. Trevor Crosby, in the Dictionary of New Zealand Biography, has credited Broun as one of the most important figures in the identification and description of New Zealand beetles. He collected the type specimens of 976 new species, mostly from examples sent to him by other collectors.

Broun gained little financially from his scientific work, but was elected as an honorary member of various European learned societies and Australian naturalists' clubs in recognition of it. He was also made a Fellow of the Royal Entomological Society. Broun left his main collection to the British Museum; despite a ban on its export initiated by New Zealand scientists, it was sent there in 1922. Other specimens from his collection are housed in the Auckland War Memorial Museum, the Canterbury Museum, the Galerie d'Entomologie in Paris, the Auckland Institute and Museum and the New Zealand Arthropod Collection (at Landcare Research's Auckland site).

Broun's work has been criticised for its limited documentation and the high rate of duplication between the purported species he identified. Many of his descriptions are now considered obsolete. He included illustrations for only 37 of his species, making identification of the animals referred to impossible without original specimens. He also published most of his species with only numbers, rather than names; in 1967, the entomologist Brenda May used Broun's handwritten records to supply names for most of the then-unknown numbers. The entomologist John Charles Watt described Broun's collecting as "intensive rather than extensive", noting that he appears never to have visited New Zealand's South Island.

While the scale of Broun's duplications has not been concretely established, he is known to have listed the ground beetle Megadromus meritus under fifteen different names, at least five of which were based on studying only a single purported specimen. The entomologist Rowan Emberson has identified this habit of duplication, which he calls the "Broun effect", as a major reason behind the huge difference in reported beetle species between New Zealand and Great Britain: the number of identified Coleoptera species in New Zealand is 80% greater than that of Great Britain, while the numbers of other insect orders, such as Hemiptera ('true bugs') and Diptera (flies), are broadly similar. Emberson estimates that the Coleoptera order has the greatest rate of unrecognised synonymy of any order of New Zealand insects.

== Selected publications ==
- Broun, Thomas (1876). "Descriptions of New Species of Coleoptera". Transactions and Proceedings of the Royal Society of New Zealand. 9: 371–374.
- — (1880–1893). Manual of the New Zealand Coleoptera (7 volumes). Wellington: James Hughes. doi:10.5962/t.173101. OCLC 463407808.
- Broun, Thomas (1909). "On the Coleoptera of the Kermadec Islands". Transactions and Proceedings of the New Zealand Institute. 42: 291–306.
- Broun, Thomas (1912). "Descriptions of New Genera and Species of Coleoptera". Transactions and Proceedings of the New Zealand Institute. 45: 97–163.
- Broun, Thomas (1914). "Descriptions of New Genera and Species of Coleoptera: Part III". New Zealand Institute Bulletin. 1 (3): 143–266.
- — (1917). "Descriptions of New Genera and Species of Coleoptera: Part V". Bulletin of the Royal Society of New Zealand. 1.
- Broun, Thomas (1921). "Descriptions of New Genera and Species of Coleoptera: Part VI" (PDF). New Zealand Institute Bulletin: 475–590.
- Broun, Thomas (1921). "Descriptions of New Genera and Species of Coleoptera: Part VII". New Zealand Institute Bulletin: 592–665.

== Works cited ==
- Bairstow, Aubrey (1997). "Addendum: Major Thomas Broun". Auckland–Waikato Historical Journal (70): 15.
- Bairstow, Aubrey (2 July 2005). "Captain (later Major) Thomas Broun, 1st Regiment of Waikato Militia". Digger History.
- Bouchard, Patrice; Bousquet, Yves (2014). The Book of Beetles: A Life-Size Guide to Six Hundred of Nature's Gems. London: Ivy Press. ISBN 9781782402329.
- Cheeseman, T. F. (1919). "Major Thomas Broun 1838–1919". Transactions and Proceedings of the New Zealand Institute. 52: ix–x – via Biodiversity Heritage Library.
- Crosby, Trevor K. (1996). "Thomas Broun". Dictionary of New Zealand Biography. Ministry for Culture and Heritage.
- Emberson, Rowan M. (1998). "The Size and Shape of New Zealand Insect Fauna". In Lynch, Robert (ed.). Ecosystems, Entomology and Plants. Wellington: The Royal Society of New Zealand. pp. 31–38. ISBN 0-908654-81-2.
- Galbreath, Ross (1998). DSIR: Making Science Work for New Zealand: Themes from the History of the Department of Scientific and Industrial Research, 1926–1992. Victoria: Victoria University Press. ISBN 978-0-86473-354-2.
- Herman, Lee H. (2001). "Catalog of the Staphylinidae (Insecta: Coleoptera): 1758 to the End of the Second Millennium: I: Introduction, History, Biographical Sketches and Omaliine Group". Bulletin of the American Museum of Natural History (265): 49.
- Holloway, Beverley Anne (2007). Lucanidae (Insecta: Coleoptera). Fauna of New Zealand. Vol. 61. Auckland: Landcare Research. ISBN 978-0-478-09395-7.
- Hutchinson, Basil R. (1996). "Major Thomas Broun – Soldier and Entomologist". Auckland–Waikato Historical Journal (67): 14–15.
- Hutchinson, Basil R. (1997). "Addendum: Major Thomas Broun". Auckland–Waikato Historical Journal (69): 40.
- Knox, George Alexander (1976). "Guest Editorial". New Zealand Journal of Zoology. 3: i–xi.
- Lucas, W. J. (1922). "David Sharp, M.A., M.B., F.E.S., etc. 1840–1922". The Entomologist. 55: 217–221. ISSN 0013-8878.
- May, Brenda M. (1967). "The Broun Species Numbers (Coleoptera)". Transactions of the Royal Society of New Zealand. 9 (13): 175.
- "Megadromus (Megadromus) meritus (Broun, 1884)". Global Biodiversity Information Facility. 2023. doi:10.15468/39omei.
- "Obituary: Major Thomas Broun". The New Zealand Herald. Vol. 56, no. 17247. 25 August 1919. p. 8. Archived from the original on 5 August 2024.
- "Presentation to Major Broun". New Zealand Herald. Vol. 44, no. 13455. 4 June 1907. p. 5.
- Trimen, Richard (1876). An Historical Memoir of the 35th Royal Sussex Regiment of Foot. Southampton: Southampton Times. OCLC 13508391.
- "War Office, Pall Mall, 8th July 1856". The London Gazette. 21899: 2378–2380. 8 July 1856.
- "War Office, Pall Mall, June 4, 1861". The Edinburgh Gazette. 7125: 742–748. 6 July 1861.
- "War Office, Pall Mall, 3rd October 1862". The London Gazette. 22668: 4724. 3 October 1862.
- Watt, John Charles (1977). "Conservation and Type Localities of New Zealand Coleoptera, and Notes on Collectors 1770–1920". Journal of the Royal Society of New Zealand. 7 (1): 79–91. Bibcode:1977JRSNZ...7...79W. doi:10.1080/03036758.1977.10419338.
