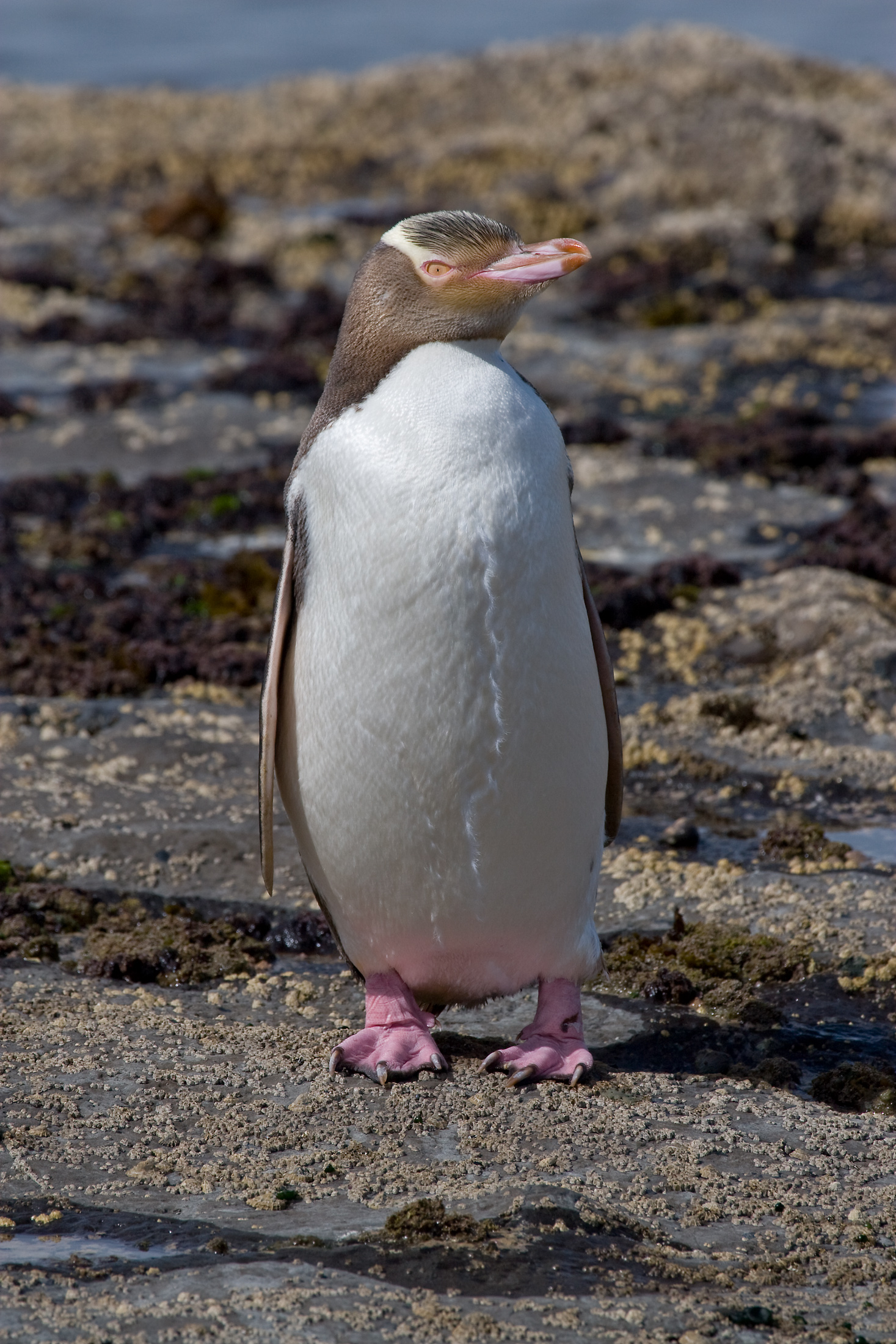
- At Curio Bay, Southland District, New Zealand

Conservation status
- Endangered (IUCN 3.1)

Scientific classification
- Kingdom: Animalia
- Phylum: Chordata
- Class: Aves
- Order: Sphenisciformes
- Family: Spheniscidae
- Genus: Megadyptes
- Species: M. antipodes

Binomial name
- Megadyptes antipodes (Hombron & Jacquinot, 1841)

Subspecies
- Megadyptes antipodes antipodes Megadyptes antipodes waitaha †; Megadyptes antipodes richdalei †
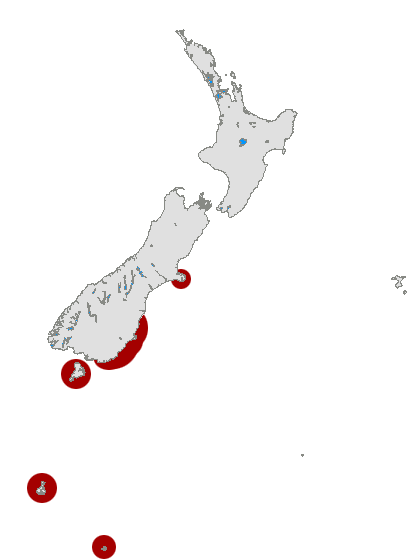
- Distribution of yellow-eyed penguin

= Yellow-eyed penguin =

Yellow-eyed penguin Temporal range: Pleistocene–Recent

Species of penguin endemic to New Zealand

The yellow-eyed penguin (Megadyptes antipodes), known also as hoiho, is a species of penguin endemic to New Zealand. It is the sole extant species in the genus Megadyptes, from Ancient Greek μέγας (mégas), meaning "large", and δύπτης (dúptes), meaning "diver".

Previously thought closely related to the little penguin (Eudyptula minor), molecular research has shown it more closely related to penguins of the genus Eudyptes. Like most penguins, it is mainly piscivorous.

The species breeds along the eastern and south-eastern coastlines of the South Island of New Zealand, as well as Stewart Island, Auckland Islands, and Campbell Islands. Colonies on the Otago Peninsula are a popular tourist venue, where visitors may closely observe penguins from hides, trenches, or tunnels.

On the New Zealand mainland, the species has experienced a significant decline over the past 20 years. On the Otago Peninsula, numbers have dropped by 75% since the mid-1990s and population trends indicate the possibility of regional extinction from the peninsula in the next 20 to 40 years. While the effect of rising ocean temperatures is still being studied, an infectious outbreak in the mid-2000s played a large role in the drop. Human activities at sea (fisheries, pollution) may have an equal if not greater influence on the species' downward trend.

== Taxonomy ==
The yellow-eyed penguin was first described by Jacques Bernard Hombron and Honoré Jacquinot in 1841.

The yellow-eyed penguin is the sole species in the genus Megadyptes, though there have been multiple subspecies. It was previously thought closely related to the little penguin, but molecular research has shown it is more closely related to penguins of the genus Eudyptes. Mitochondrial and nuclear DNA evidence suggests it split from the ancestors of Eudyptes around 15 million years ago. In 2019 the 1.25Gb genome of the species was published as part of the Penguin Genome Consortium, aiming to understand the origins and aid conservation by helping to inform any future breeding programmes.

=== Subspecies ===
==== Megadyptes antipodes antipodes ====
The hoiho or yellow-eyed penguin (M. a. antipodes) is the only extant subspecies. They were formerly most abundant in the subantarctic Auckland and Campbell Islands, and colonised Stewart Island / Rakiura and parts of the South Island following the extinction of the Waitaha penguin.

There are proposals to split the yellow-eyed penguin into three further subspecies due to genetic differences. Genome sequencing of 249 penguins from across the New Zealand mainland and the subantarctic Enderby and Campbell Islands identified clear genetic divisions in each location with negligible gene flow between the populations, consistent with there being three distinct subspecies. Based on comparisons of these genomes the authors estimated that the three lineages diverged between 5,000 and 16,000 years ago, although the proposed historic co-existence of two Megadyptes subspecies in southern New Zealand remains unexplained.

==== Megadyptes antipodes waitaha ====
The Waitaha penguin (M. a. waitaha) is an extinct subspecies that was present in the North Island, the South Island, Stewart Island, and Codfish Island / Whenua Hou. Last dated to AD 1347–1529. It was discovered by University of Otago and University of Adelaide scientists comparing the foot bones of 500-year-old, 100-year-old and modern specimens of penguins. According to lead researcher Sanne Boessenkool, Waitaha penguins "were around 10% smaller than the yellow-eyed penguin. The two species are very closely related, but we can't say if they had a yellow crown". The penguin was named after the Māori iwi (tribe) Waitaha, whose tribal lands included the areas the Waitaha penguin are thought to have inhabited. "Our findings demonstrate that yellow-eyed penguins on mainland New Zealand are not a declining remnant of a previous abundant population, but came from the subantarctic relatively recently and replaced the extinct Waitaha penguin", said team member Dr Jeremy Austin, deputy director of the Australasian Centre for Ancient DNA. Archaeological remains indicate that early Polynesian settlers hunted the subspecies and that this, with possible additional predation by Polynesian rats and dogs, was a probable cause of extinction. As the local Māori people have no record of this subspecies, it is estimated to have perished between c. 1300 and 1500, soon after Polynesian settlers arrived in New Zealand. It was first described as a new species M. waitaha in 2009, but reclassified as a subspecies M. a. waitaha in studies from 2019 and 2022. After their extinction, their range was occupied by yellow-eyed penguins (now M. a. antipodes), previously most abundant further south in the subantarctic islands. The decrease in sea lion populations after human settlement may also have eased their expansion. Another coauthor, Dr Phil Seddon, said "these unexpected results highlight ... the dynamic nature of ecosystem change, where the loss of one species may open up opportunities for the expansion of another".

==== Megadyptes antipodes richdalei ====
Richdale's penguin (M. a. richdalei) is an extinct island dwarf subspecies from the Chatham Islands. Last dated after the 13th century, it was hunted to extinction.

== Description ==
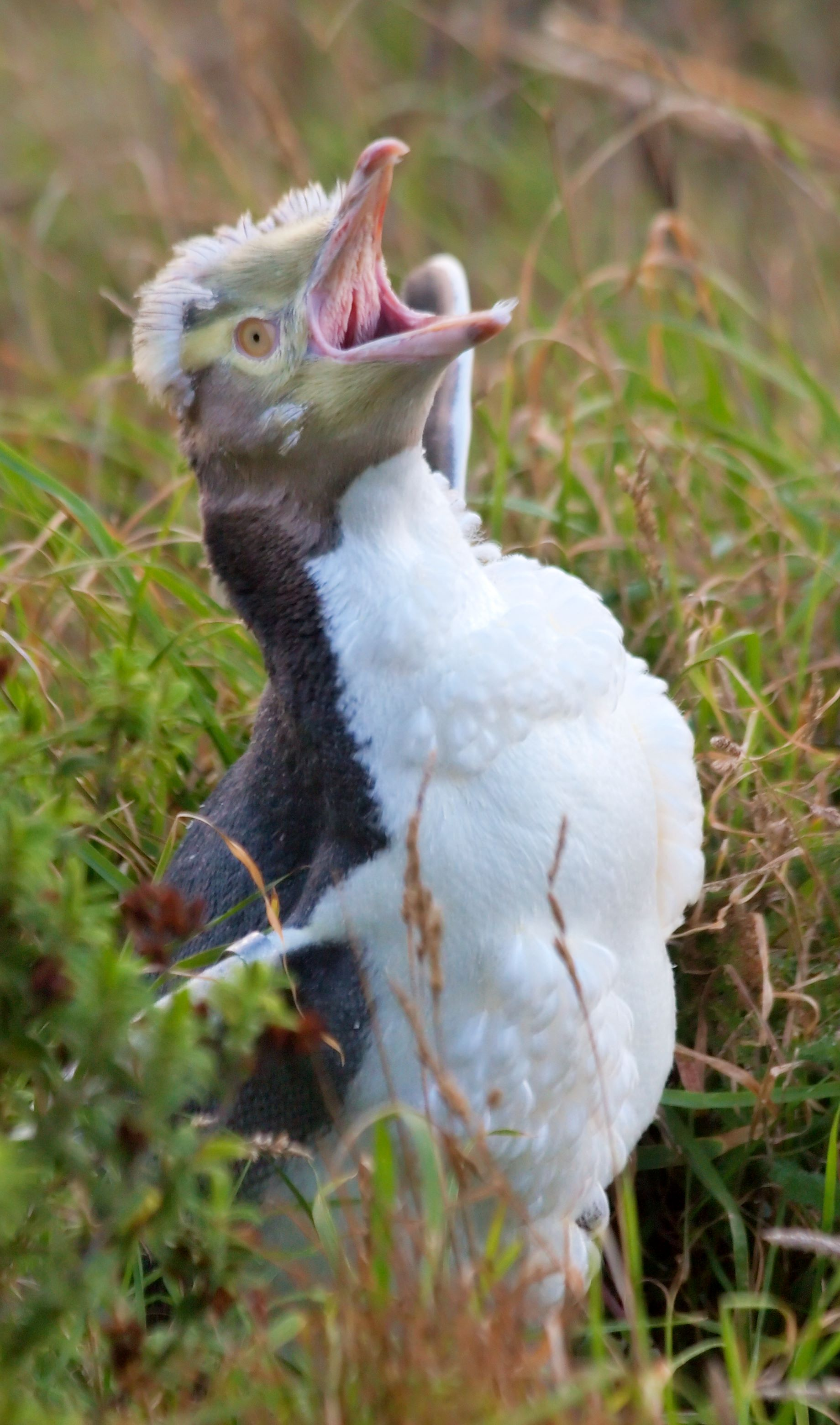
Moulting yellow-eyed penguin at Oamaru, New Zealand

The yellow-eyed penguin (M. a. antipodes) is most easily identified by the band of pale yellow feathers surrounding its eyes and encircling the back of its head. Its forehead, crown and the sides of its face are slate grey flecked with golden yellow. Its eye is yellow. The foreneck and sides of the head are light brown. The back and tail are slate blue-black. Its chest, stomach, thighs and the underside of its flippers are white in colour. Juvenile birds have a greyer head with no yellow band around their eyes.

It is the largest living penguin to breed on the mainland of New Zealand and the fourth or fifth heaviest living penguin by body mass. It stands 62–79 centimetres (24–31 in) tall and weighs 3–8.5 kilograms (6.6–18.7 lb). Weight varies throughout the year, with penguins being heaviest just before moulting, during which they may lose 3–4 kilograms in weight. Males at around 5.53 kg (12.2 lb) on average are somewhat heavier than females at an average of 5.13 kg (11.3 lb).

The yellow-eyed penguin may be long lived, with some individuals reaching 20 years of age. Males are generally longer lived than females, leading to a sex ratio of 2:1 around the age of 10–12 years.

The yellow-eyed penguin is mostly silent. It makes a shrill bray-like call at nest and breeding sites.

== Distribution and habitat ==
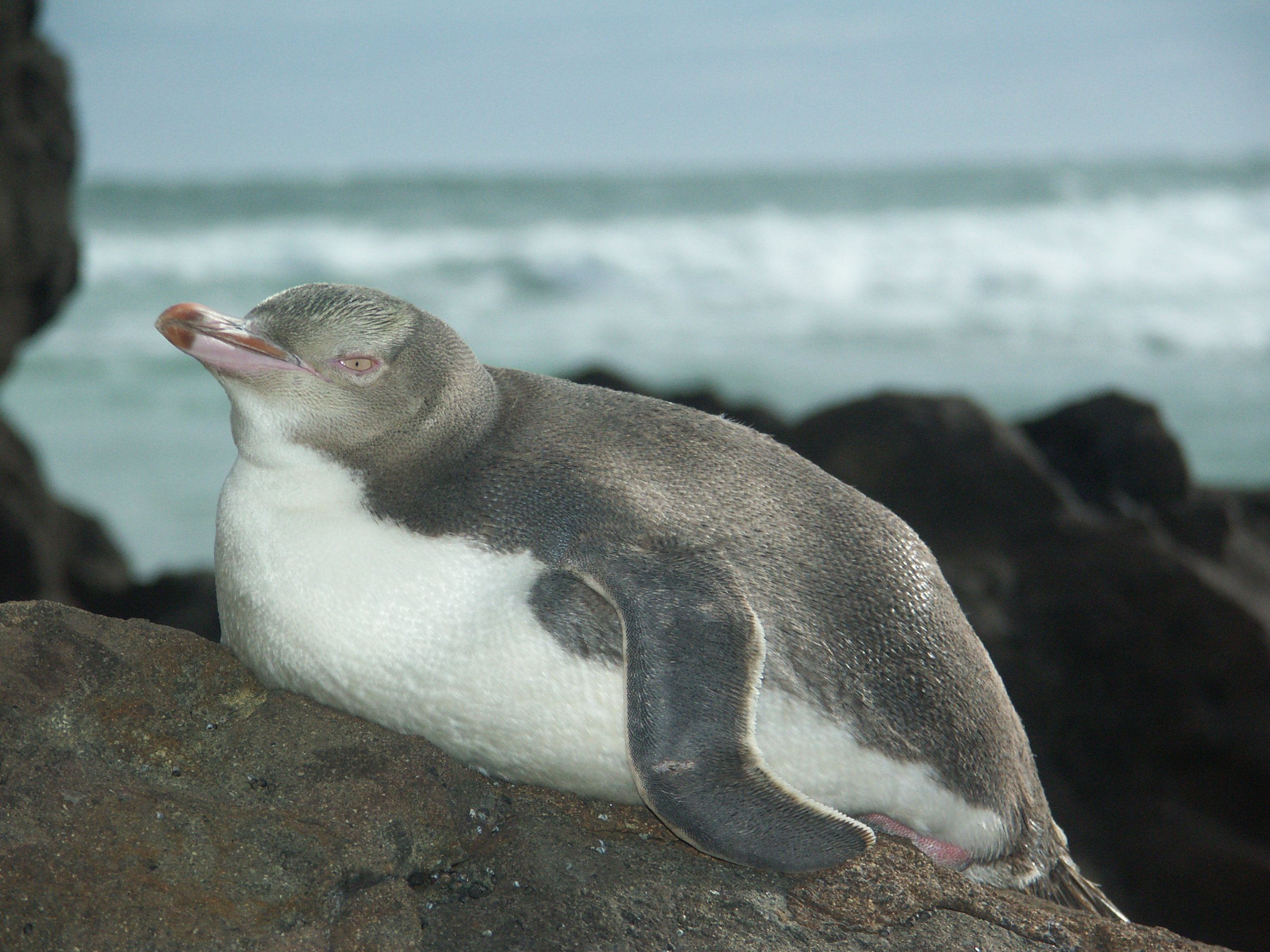
Juvenile in The Catlins, New Zealand

Until recently, it was assumed that M. a. antipodes was widespread and abundant before the arrival of Polynesian settlers in New Zealand. However, genetic analysis has since revealed that its range only expanded to include mainland New Zealand in the past 200 years. Yellow-eyed penguins expanded out of the subantarctic to replace New Zealand's endemic Waitaha penguin (M. a. waitaha). The Waitaha penguin became extinct between about 1300 and 1500, soon after Polynesian settlers arrived in New Zealand. Jeremy Austin, a member of the team that discovered the Waitaha penguin, said, "Our findings demonstrate that yellow-eyed penguins on mainland New Zealand are not a declining remnant of a previous abundant population, but came from the subantarctic relatively recently and replaced the extinct Waitaha penguin".

An island dwarf subspecies from the Chatham Islands, M. a. richdalei, is extinct. The modern population of yellow-eyed penguins does not breed on the Chatham Islands.

Today, yellow-eyed penguins are found in two distinct populations. The northern population extends along the southeast coast of the South Island of New Zealand, down to Stewart Island / Rakiura and Codfish Island / Whenua Hou. It includes four main breeding areas in Banks Peninsula, North Otago, Otago Peninsula and the Catlins. It is also referred to as the mainland population. The southern population includes the subantarctic Auckland Islands and Campbell Island / Motu Ihupuku. There is little gene flow between the northern and southern populations as the large stretch of ocean between the South Island and subantarctic region and the subtropical convergence act as a natural barrier. Based on monitoring between 2012-2017, there are on average 577 breeding pairs per year on Enderby Island in the Auckland Islands, which comprise 37-49% of the total breeding population for the species.

== Behaviour ==
=== Breeding ===
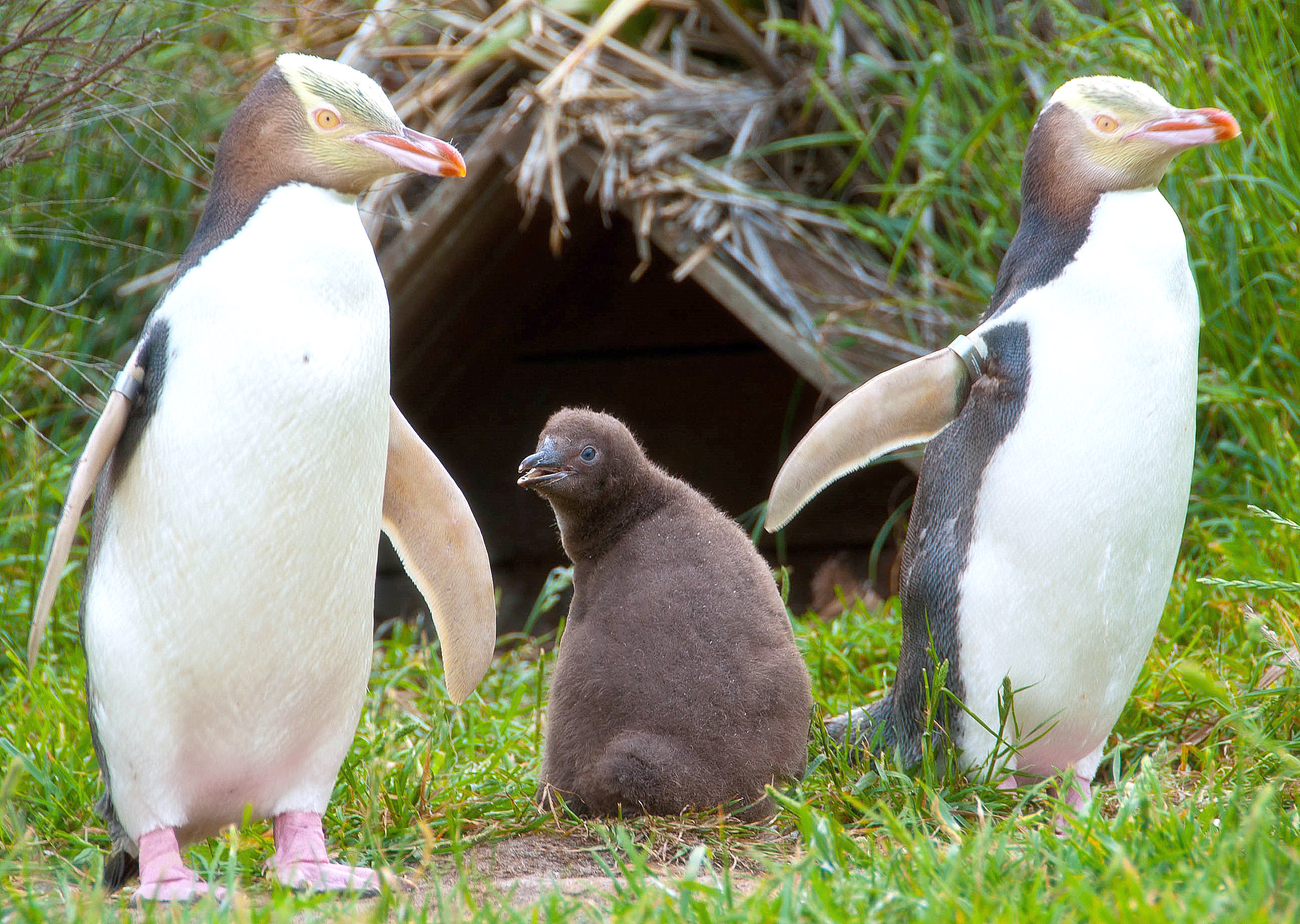
A family of yellow-eyed penguin at the Penguin Place Lodge at Otago Peninsula, Dunedin, New Zealand

The nesting behaviour of yellow-eyed penguins is thought to be the least colonial of all penguin species. While other penguin species nest in large aggregations, yellow-eyed penguins tend to nest in solitary pairs or loose aggregations.

Yellow-eyed penguins begin forming pairs and breeding at around two years of age. An analysis of data collected from 1991 to 2002 showed that the species has a 63% rate of retaining mates each breeding season. The majority of changes were due to the death of their partner.

While they can be seen coming ashore in groups of four to six or more individuals, they then disperse along tracks to individual nest sites up to one kilometre inland. Accordingly, the consensus among New Zealand penguin workers is to use habitat rather than colony to refer to areas where yellow-eyed penguins nest.

The species prefers to nest in forest or scrub habitat with dense vegetation cover. Adults will incorporate vegetation such as twigs, grasses and leaves into their nests, and often return to the same nesting area each year. Breeding sites are frequented year-round, and adults may continue to defend their nest areas outside of the breeding season. Nests tend to be visually isolated from one another, though they are usually in audible distance from each other.

Nest site selection takes place from June onwards, with breeding beginning in late August, followed by incubation from September to November.

After hatching, chicks are guarded by an adult full-time for the first 40–50 days. Incubation duties are shared by both parents, who may spend several days on the nest at a time. For the first six weeks after hatching, the chicks are guarded during the day by one parent while the other is at sea feeding. The foraging adult returns at least daily to feed the chicks and relieve the partner. After the chicks are six weeks of age, both parents go to sea to supply food to their rapidly growing offspring. Chicks usually fledge in mid-February and are totally independent from then on. Chick fledge weights are generally between 5 and 6 kg.

=== Feeding ===
A yellow-eyed penguin diving to the seafloor and catching an opalfish off the Otago Peninsula

Around 90% of the yellow-eyed penguin's diet is made up of fish, chiefly demersal species that live near the seafloor, including silversides (Argentina elongata), blue cod (Parapercis colias), red cod (Pseudophycis bachus), and opalfish (Hemerocoetes monopterygius). Other species taken are New Zealand blueback sprat (Sprattus antipodum) and cephalopods such as arrow squid (Nototodarus sloanii). They also eat some crustaceans, including krill (Nyctiphanes australis). Recently, jellyfish were found to be targeted by the penguins. While initially thought that the birds would prey on jellyfish itself, deployments of camera loggers revealed that the penguins were going after juvenile fish and fish larvae associated with jellyfish.

Breeding penguins usually undertake two kinds of foraging trips: day trips where the birds leave at dawn and return in the evening ranging up to 25 km from their colonies, and shorter evening trips during which the birds are seldom away from their nest longer than four hours or range farther than 7 km. Yellow-eyed penguins are known to be an almost exclusive benthic forager that searches for prey along the seafloor. Accordingly, up to 90% of their dives are benthic dives. This also means that their average dive depths are determined by the water depths within their home ranges, but can swim up to 240 meters below the water surface.

== Conservation ==
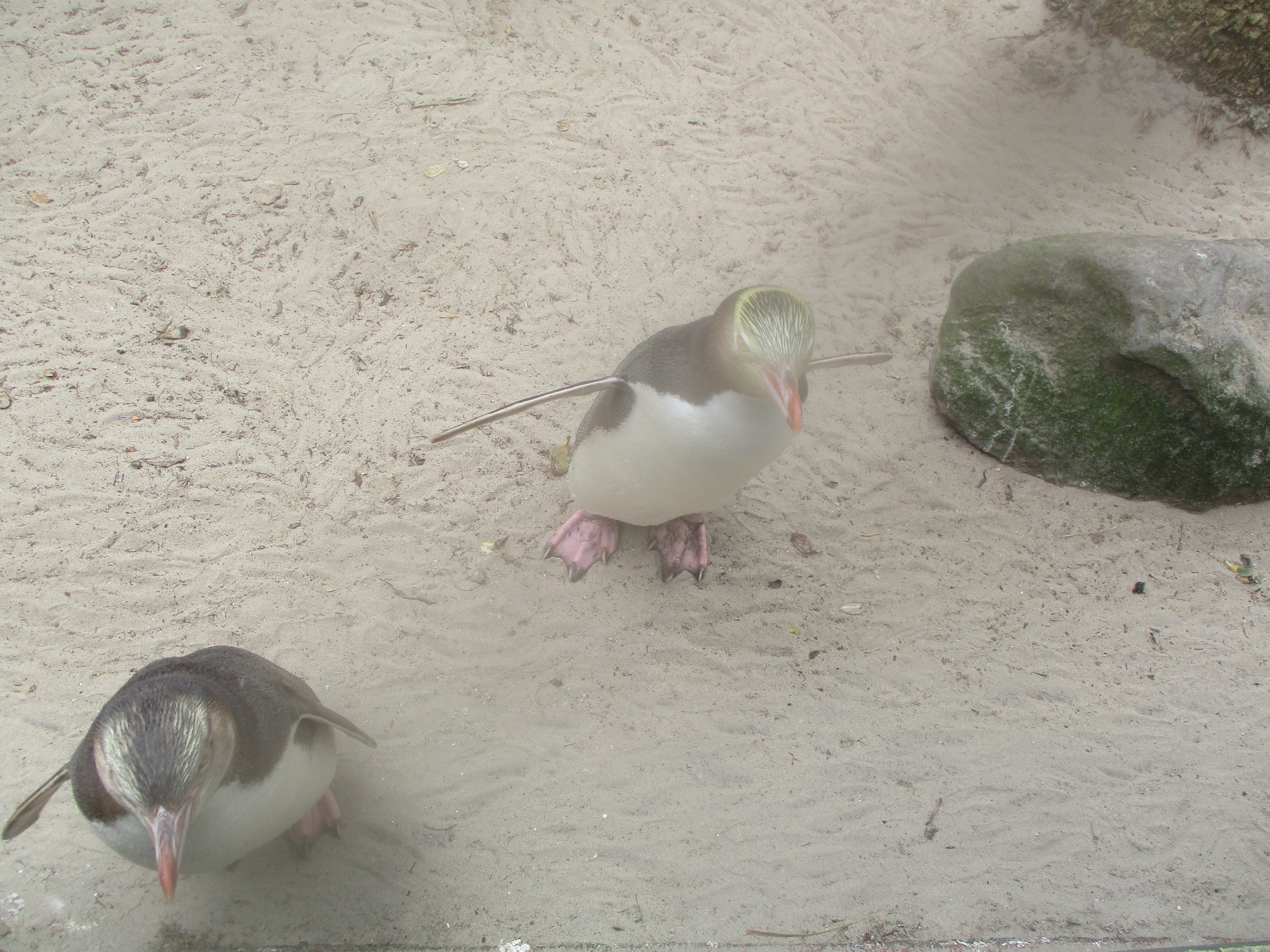
Yellow-eyed penguins on Otago Peninsula

The yellow-eyed penguin is considered one of the rarest penguin species in the world. It is listed on the IUCN Red List as being endangered. It was first included on the list in 1988 when it was listed as threatened, and was changed to endangered in the year 2000.

=== Northern population ===
Around a third of the total yellow-eyed penguin population live on the mainland. Data from the Department of Conservation showed that the northern population had collapsed by 80 percent since 2008, from 739 breeding pairs to just 143 in 2025. Experts is likely that the group could disappear within the next 20 years if the trend continues. The last breeding-age female at Sandfly Bay died in 2024, after being caught in a set net, leaving the site functionally extinct.

The northern population includes colonies on Rakiura Stewart Island. The number of breeding pairs fell from an estimated 154 pairs in 2008/2009, to 44 in 2022.

=== Southern population ===
The subantarctic population, where the majority of the species breeds, is less studied. Monitoring of the 2015 to 2017 breeding seasons found that fledging success tended to be higher than on the mainland, although chicks were smaller and lighter on average.

=== Threats ===
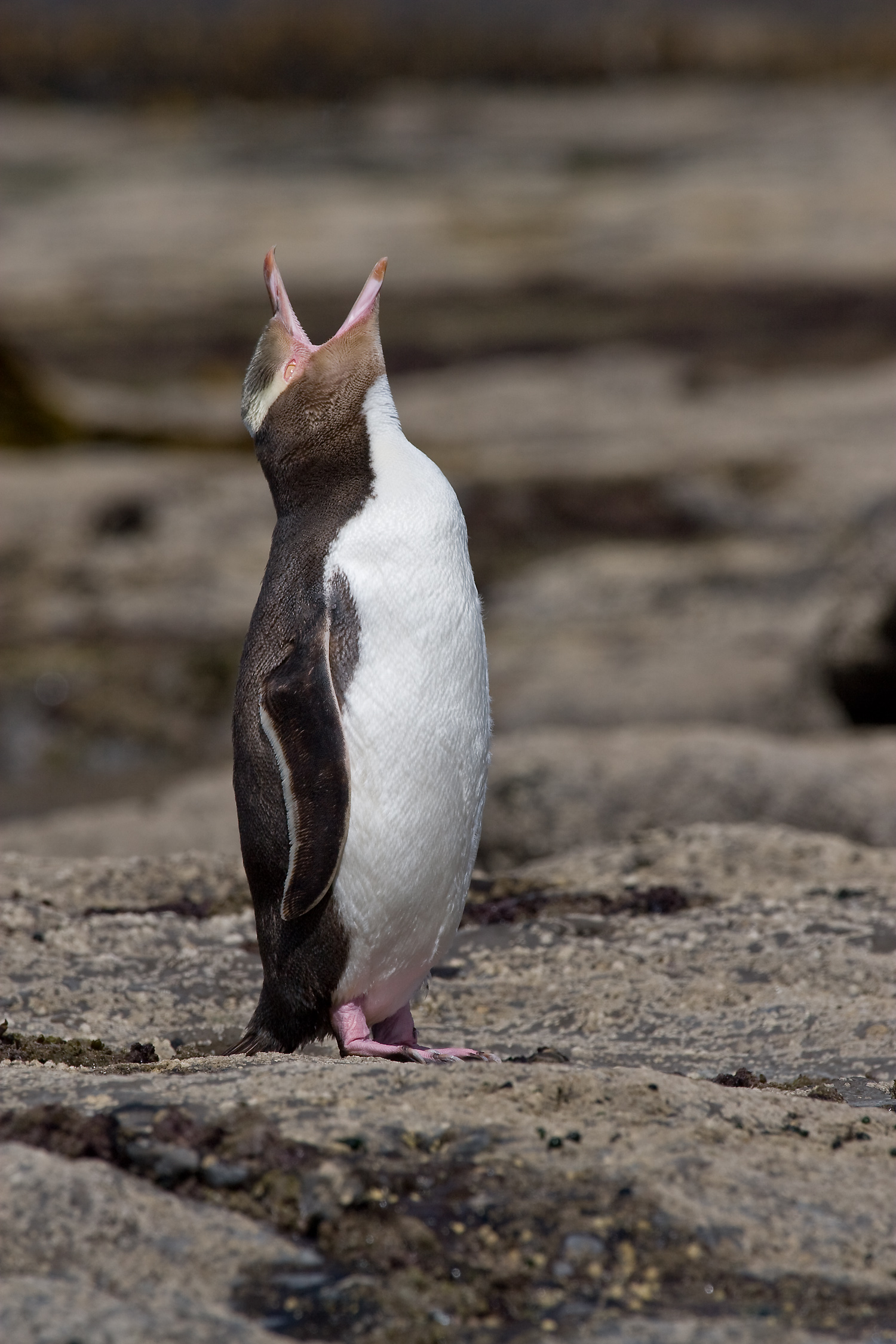
Penguin calling at Curio Bay, New Zealand

Populations of yellow-eyed penguins are threatened by multiple factors.

A risk assessment published in November 2025 indicated the biggest threats to the species are malnutrition, predation, disease, other trauma/unidentifiable sources, and fishing. Sea surface temperature has also been shown to influence the survival of both adults and fledglings.

The northern population is declining as a result of recurring poor breeding seasons and ongoing high adult mortality. Threats at sea include poor foraging success, and becoming caught in fisheries equipment. Chicks are often lost at sea, with only 20% projected to make it back to land for nesting, and only 5% expected to breed. The use of gillnets has been identified as a particular threat to the species.

Studies carried out during the 1980s showed that red cod is a key part of their diet, however red cod populations have since declined, and more recent investigation has found that the penguins are feeding on blue cod instead, which provide less suitable nutrition. The diet of the penguins has changed from around 24 species in the 1990s to just two.

Disease also poses a key threat to the species, which poor nutrition makes them more vulnerable to. A previously undescribed disease killed off 60% of yellow-eyed penguin chicks on the Otago Peninsula and in North Otago in 2004. The disease has been described as diphtheritic stomatitis, caused by infection of Corynebacterium, a genus of bacteria that also causes diphtheria in humans. A similar problem has affected the Stewart Island population.

In 2023, a novel Gyrovirus was identified as the likely cause of the mysterious and fatal respiratory illness which had killed roughly a quarter of the yellow-eyed penguin chicks from the mainland during the 2021 November to December hatching season. The virus has a mortality rate of more than 90% and is almost instantly fatal, capable of killing the chicks within hours.

It was estimated in 2023 around 320 individuals died. Severe disease appears to be concentrated in the mainland population, and research suggests this may be due to their unique evolutionary history, identifying genes associated with susceptibility to disease.

=== Mitigations ===
A reserve protecting more than 10% of the mainland population was established at Long Point in the Catlins in November 2007 by the Department of Conservation and the Yellow-eyed Penguin Trust. The species was granted protection under the U.S. Endangered Species Act in 2010.

Due to the extreme disease outbreak and subsequent mortality, the Dunedin Wildlife Hospital began treating chicks with disease symptoms or weight loss. In 2022, the hospital successfully incubated and hatched eggs for the first time. The following year, the hospital hand-reared 214 chicks, as it was estimated that 50 to 70% of chicks would have died without intervention. Research is underway into finding a vaccine for the virus.

==== Set net fishing ban ====
In September 2025, a three-month emergency ban on set net fishing was put in place around Otago Peninsula to protect the yellow-eyed penguin, which was soon extended by another nine months. The closure extended the existing four nautical mile set net ban, which was in place to protect dolphins, out to eight nautical miles.

The ban came after urgent calls from conservation groups as the species entered their breeding season. The following month, the Environmental Law Initiative (ELI) filed High Court proceedings against the Minister for Oceans and Fisheries on the basis that the set net ban failed to protect the species against extinction. The extension applied to waters surrounding the Otago Peninsula, leaving habitats including North Otago and Stewart Island unprotected. In February 2026, the proceedings filed by ELI against the Minister were dismissed by the High Court. In the same ruling, the court recognised that the temporary emergency closure is lawful, and that ministers must work to safeguard the species’ survival.

In July 2026, the ban on set net fishing around Otago Peninsula was made permanent.

== Tourism ==
Several mainland habitats have hides and are relatively accessible for those wishing to watch the birds come ashore. These include beaches at Oamaru, the Moeraki lighthouse, a number of beaches near Dunedin, and the Catlins. In addition, commercial tourist operations on Otago Peninsula also provide hides to view yellow-eyed penguins. However, the yellow-eyed penguin cannot be found in zoos because it will not reproduce in captivity.

=== Impact of human presence ===
Research has indicated that the presence of humans in their coast habitat can negatively influence the behaviour of yellow-eyed penguins. The transit time for individual penguins to move from land to sea is increased when people are nearby, and around a fifth of transits are abandoned when a human is present. When people are present on an area of beach near penguin landing sites, the penguins are less likely to come ashore. This behaviour has potential implications for chick survival; probability of survival is correlated with fledgling weight, and the influences from humans preventing adults from coming ashore may lead to reduced fledgling success.

== In culture ==
- The hoiho appears on the reverse side of the New Zealand five-dollar note.
- The yellow-eyed penguin is the mascot to Dunedin City Council's recycling and solid waste management campaign.
- The yellow-eyed penguin is also featured in Farce of the Penguins, in which they complain about global warming.
- In 2019 the yellow-eyed penguin was crowned the Bird of the Year in New Zealand, the first win for a seabird in the competition's 14-year history. It was again victorious in the 2024 competition.

== See also ==
- Fauna of New Zealand
- List of extinct New Zealand animals
- List of birds of New Zealand
