= Hemerocoetes artus =

Scientific classification
- Domain: Eukaryota
- Kingdom: Animalia
- Phylum: Chordata
- Class: Actinopterygii
- Order: Acropomatiformes
- Family: Hemerocoetidae
- Genus: Hemerocoetes
- Species: H. artus

Binomial name
- Hemerocoetes artus Nelson, 1979

Species of ray-finned fish

Hemerocoetes artus is a ray-finned fish of the genus Hemerocoetes, found only around the subantarctic islands south of New Zealand at depths of between 100 and 600 m. Their length is between 10 and 25 cm.
