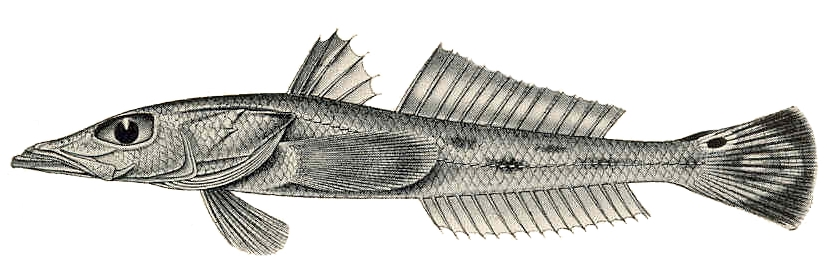
- Bembrops caudimacula

Scientific classification
- Kingdom: Animalia
- Phylum: Chordata
- Class: Actinopterygii
- Order: Perciformes
- Family: Bembropidae
- Genus: Bembrops; Steindachner, 1876

Type species
- Bembrops caudimacula Steindachner, 1876

Synonyms
- Bathypercis Alcock, 1894; Hypsicometes Goode, 1880

= Bembrops =

Genus of ray-finned fishes

Bembrops is a genus of ray-finned fish, it is the type genus of the family Bembropidae.

== Species ==
The following species are classified as members of the genus Bembrops:

- Bembrops anatirostris Ginsburg, 1955
- Bembrops cadenati Das & Nelson, 1996
- Bembrops caudimacula Steindachner, 1876
- Bembrops curvatura Okada & Suzuki, 1952
- Bembrops filiferus Gilbert, 1905
- Bembrops gobioides (Goode, 1880)
- Bembrops greyi Poll, 1959
- Bembrops heterurus (Miranda-Ribeiro, 1903)
- Bembrops macromma Ginsburg, 1955
- Bembrops magnisquamis Ginsburg, 1955
- Bembrops morelandi Nelson, 1978
- Bembrops nelsoni Thompson & Suttkus, 2002
- Bembrops nematopterus Norman, 1939
- Bembrops ocellatus Thompson & Suttkus, 1998
- Bembrops platyrhynchus (Alcock, 1894)
- Bembrops quadrisella Thompson & Suttkus, 1998
- Bembrops raneyi Thompson & Suttkus, 1998
