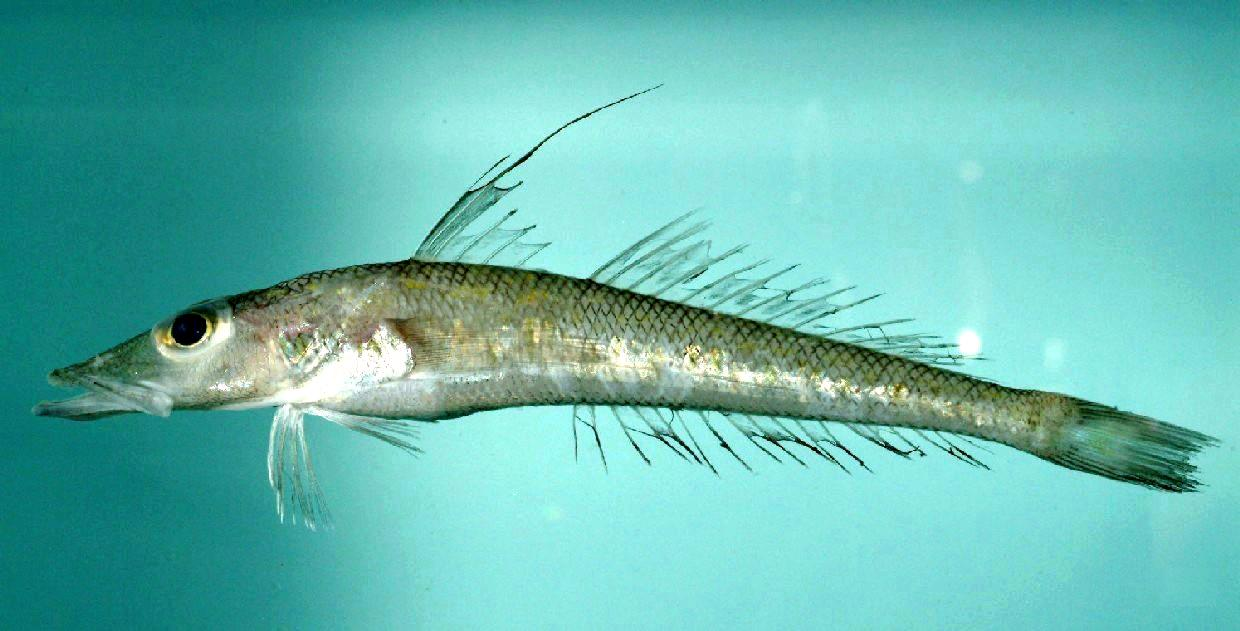

Conservation status
- Least Concern (IUCN 3.1)

Scientific classification
- Kingdom: Animalia
- Phylum: Chordata
- Class: Actinopterygii
- Order: Perciformes
- Family: Bembropidae
- Genus: Bembrops
- Species: B. anatirostris

Binomial name
- Bembrops anatirostris Ginsburg, 1955

= Bembrops anatirostris =

Species of ray-finned fish

Bembrops anatirostris, commonly known as a duckbill flathead, is a species of ray-finned fish in the family Bembropidae. It is a deepwater fish typically found at depths between 100–400 metres (330–1,310 ft) in the western Atlantic Ocean. It can grow to a length of 35 centimetres (14 in).
