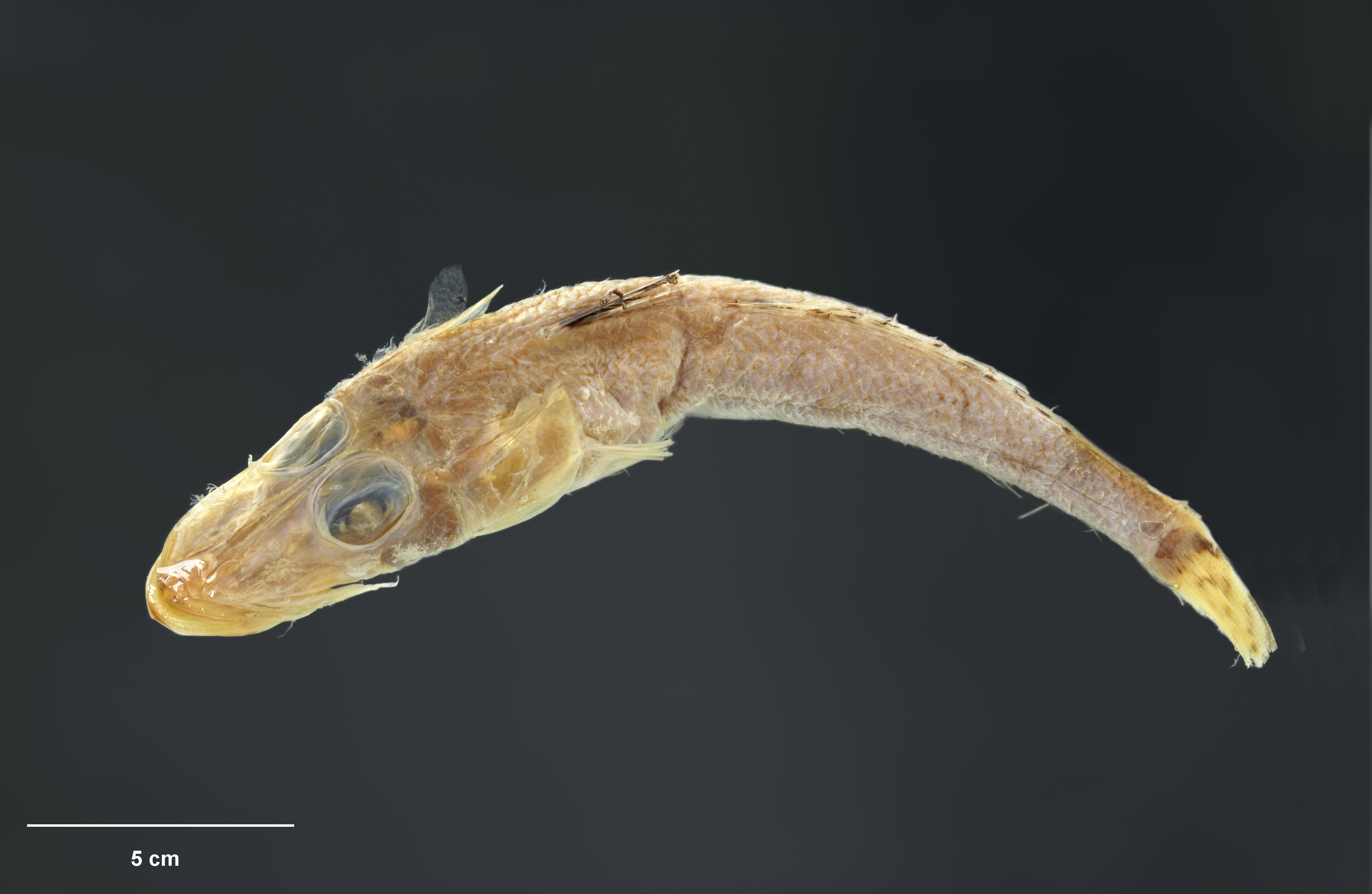
- Type specimen from the collections of Te Papa

Scientific classification
- Kingdom: Animalia
- Phylum: Chordata
- Class: Actinopterygii
- Order: Perciformes
- Family: Bembropidae
- Genus: Bembrops
- Species: B. morelandi

Binomial name
- Bembrops morelandi J. S. Nelson, 1978

= New Zealand flathead =

Species of ray-finned fish

The New Zealand flathead (Bembrops morelandi) is a ray-finned fish of the family Bembropidae, found only around New Zealand, at depths between 365 and 395 m. Their length is up to 20 cm.

== Etymology ==
The flathead is named in honor of John "Jock" Munne Moreland (1921-2012), who was the Curator of Ichthyology and Herpetology at the National Museum of New Zealand, because of his contribution to the study of the fishes of New Zealand.
