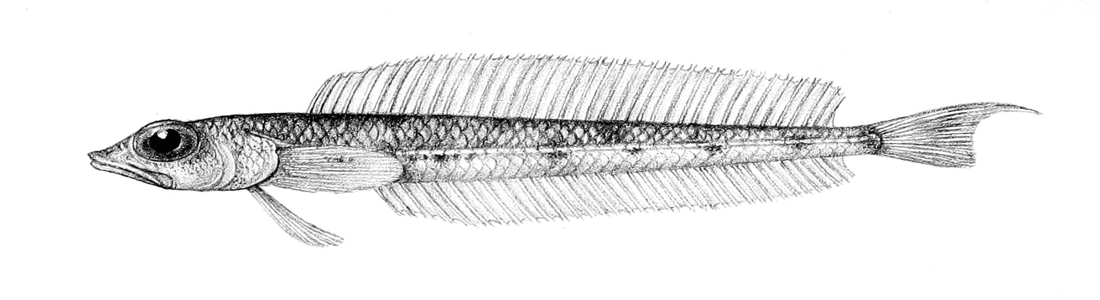

Scientific classification
- Domain: Eukaryota
- Kingdom: Animalia
- Phylum: Chordata
- Class: Actinopterygii
- Order: Acropomatiformes
- Family: Hemerocoetidae
- Genus: Hemerocoetes
- Species: H. macrophthalmus

Binomial name
- Hemerocoetes macrophthalmus Regan, 1914

= Hemerocoetes macrophthalmus =

Species of ray-finned fish

Hemerocoetes macrophthalmus is a ray-finned fish of the genus Hemerocoetes, found only around New Zealand, and around the South Island at depths of between 100 and 500 m. Their length is between 10 and 25 cm.
