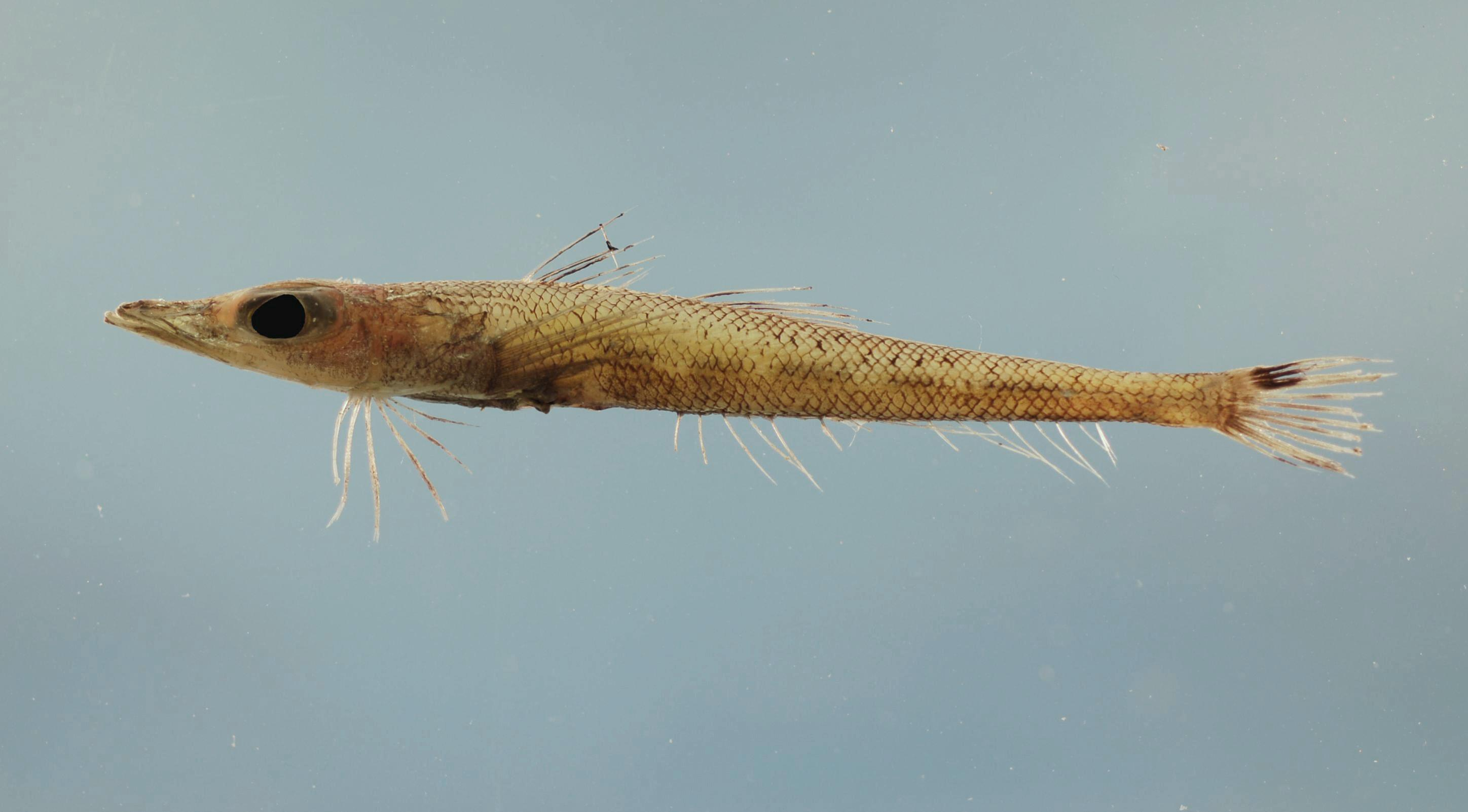

Conservation status
- Least Concern (IUCN 3.1)

Scientific classification
- Kingdom: Animalia
- Phylum: Chordata
- Class: Actinopterygii
- Order: Perciformes
- Family: Bembropidae
- Genus: Bembrops
- Species: B. gobioides

Binomial name
- Bembrops gobioides Goode, 1880

= Bembrops gobioides =

Species of ray-finned fish

Bembrops gobioides, the goby flathead, is a species of ray-finned fish in the family Bembropidae. It is found in the western Atlantic Ocean from New York to the Caribbean Sea. It is a benthic, predatory fish which lives at depths of up to 724 metres (2,375 ft) but is more normally recorded between 350 metres (1,150 ft) and 450 metres (1,480 ft).
