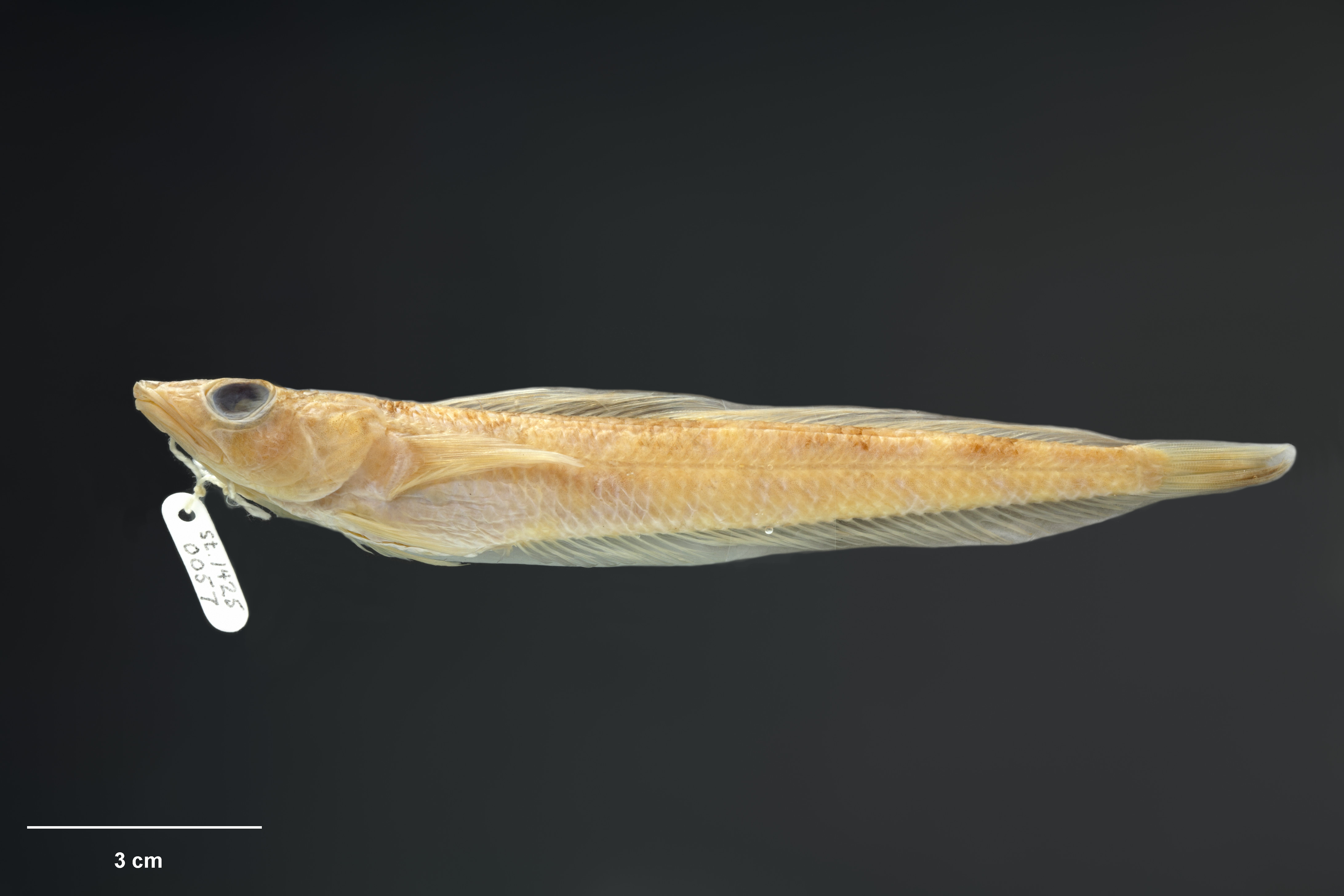
- Type specimen from the collections of Te Papa

Scientific classification
- Domain: Eukaryota
- Kingdom: Animalia
- Phylum: Chordata
- Class: Actinopterygii
- Order: Acropomatiformes
- Family: Hemerocoetidae
- Genus: Hemerocoetes
- Species: H. morelandi

Binomial name
- Hemerocoetes morelandi Nelson, 1979

= Hemerocoetes morelandi =

Species of ray-finned fish

Hemerocoetes morelandi is a ray-finned fish of the genus Hemerocoetes, found only around New Zealand at depths of between 20 and 100 metres (66 and 328 ft). Their length is between 10 and 25 centimetres (3.9 and 9.8 in).

== Etymology ==
The specific name honours the New Zealand ichthyologist J. M. Moreland.
