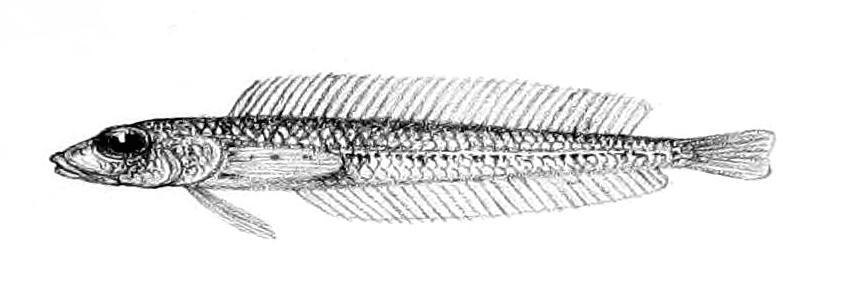

Scientific classification
- Domain: Eukaryota
- Kingdom: Animalia
- Phylum: Chordata
- Class: Actinopterygii
- Order: Acropomatiformes
- Family: Hemerocoetidae
- Genus: Hemerocoetes
- Species: H. pauciradiatus

Binomial name
- Hemerocoetes pauciradiatus Regan, 1914

= Hemerocoetes pauciradiatus =

Species of ray-finned fish

Hemerocoetes pauciradiatus is a ray-finned fish of the genus Hemerocoetes, found only around New Zealand at depths of between 20 and 200 metres (66 and 656 ft). Their length is between 10 and 25 centimetres (3.9 and 9.8 in).
