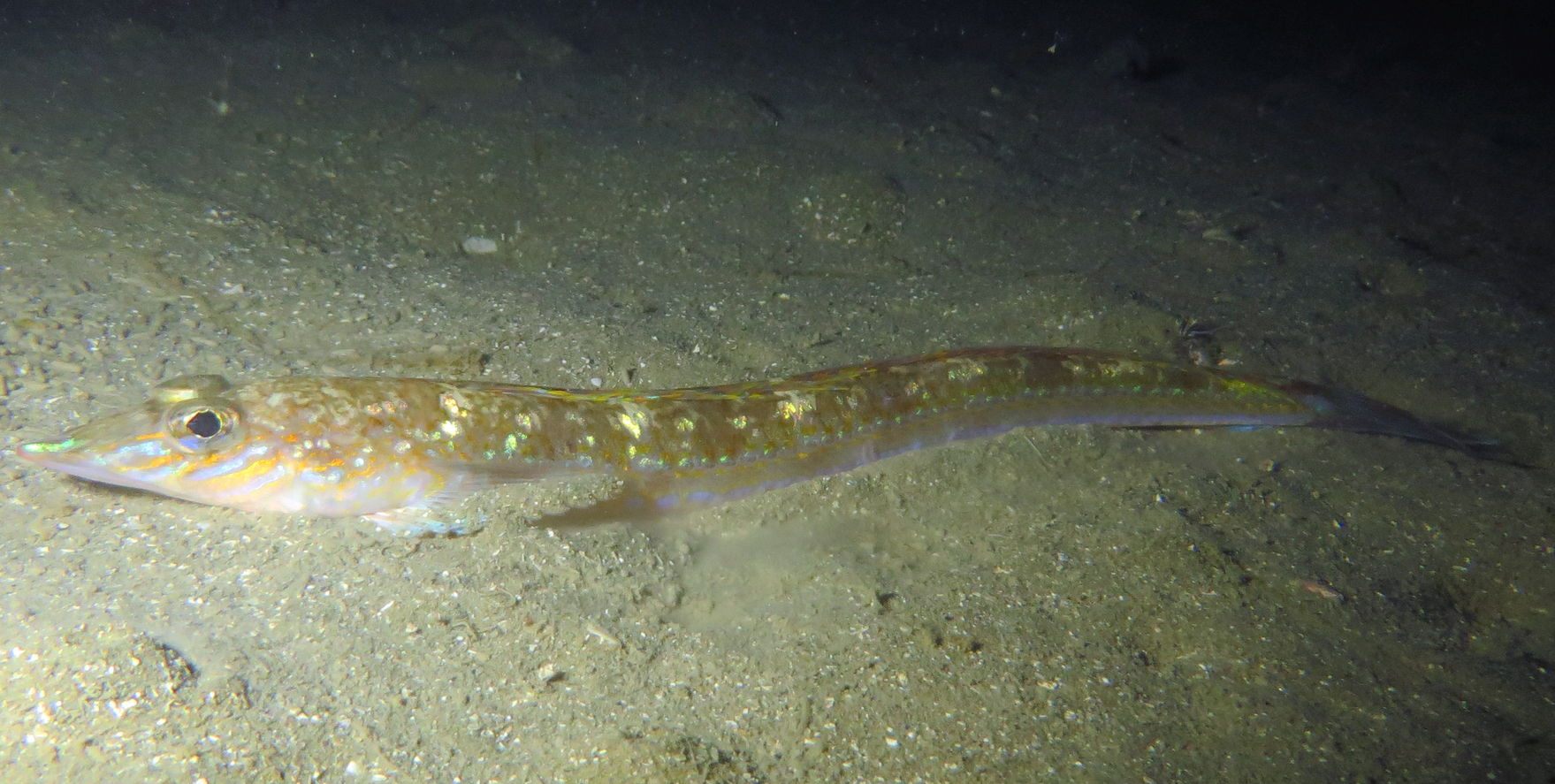
- An opalfish observed in the Wellington Harbour

Conservation status
- Least Concern (IUCN 3.1)

Scientific classification
- Kingdom: Animalia
- Phylum: Chordata
- Class: Actinopterygii
- Order: Acropomatiformes
- Family: Hemerocoetidae
- Genus: Hemerocoetes
- Species: H. monopterygius

Binomial name
- Hemerocoetes monopterygius Schneider, 1801

= Opalfish =

Species of ray-finned fish

The opalfish (Hemerocoetes monopterygius; Māori: kohikohi) is a ray-finned fish of the genus Hemerocoetes, found only around New Zealand, at depths of between 5 and 200 metres (16 and 656 ft). Their length is between 10 and 25 centimetres (3.9 and 9.8 in).

== Gallery ==
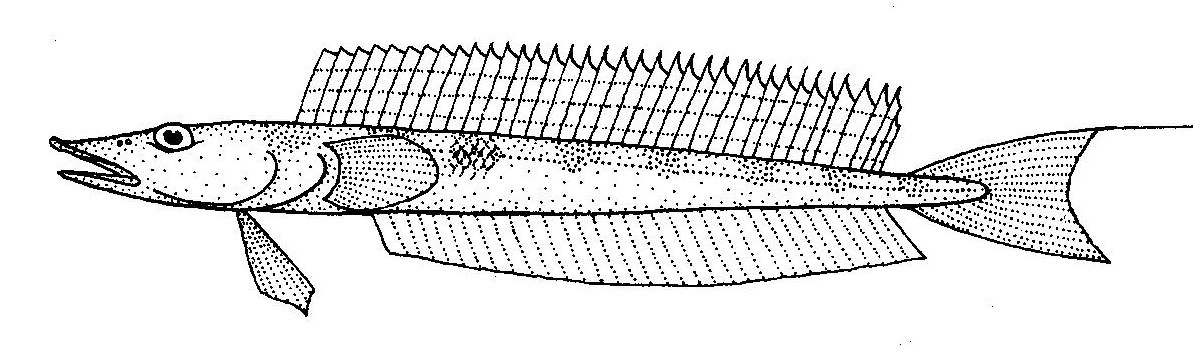
Drawing by Dr Tony Ayling

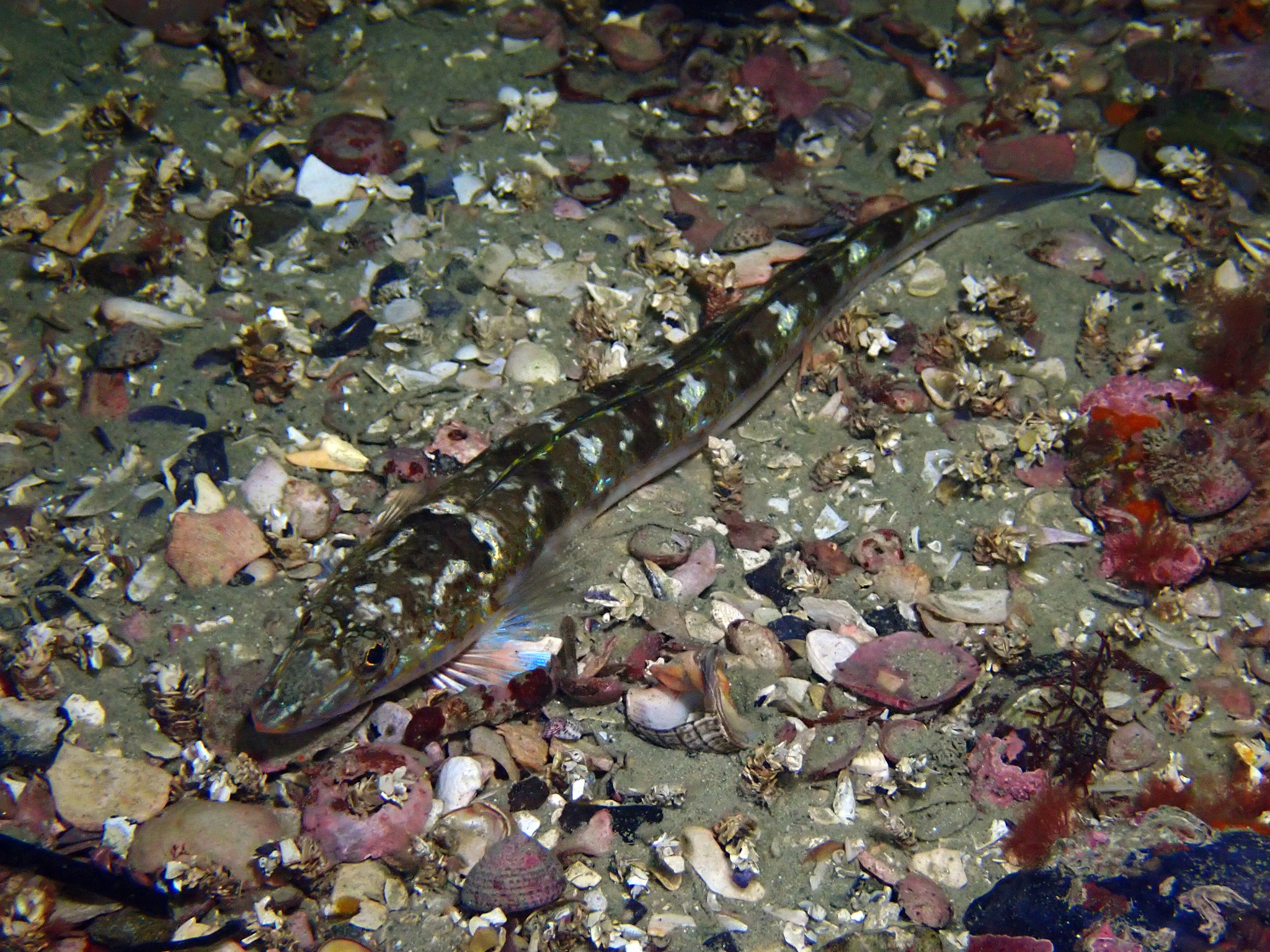
An opalfish surrounded by shells
