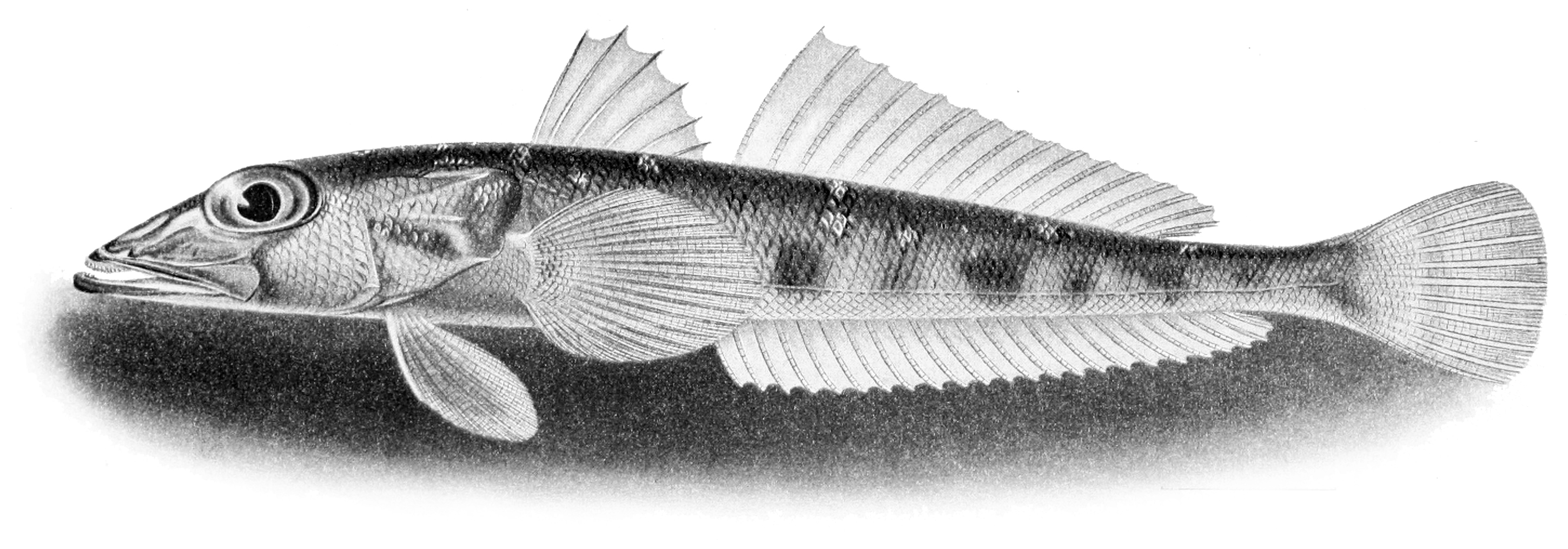
- Chrionema chryseres

Scientific classification
- Kingdom: Animalia
- Phylum: Chordata
- Class: Actinopterygii
- Order: Perciformes
- Family: Bembropidae
- Genus: Chrionema; Gilbert, 1905

Type species
- Chrionema chryseres Gilbert, 1905

Synonyms
- Chriomystax Ginsburg, 1955

= Chrionema =

Genus of ray-finned fishes

Chrionema is a genus of ray-finned fish from the family Bembropidae.

== Species ==
The following species are members of Chrionema:

- Chrionema chlorotaenia McKay, 1971
- Chrionema chryseres Gilbert, 1905
- Chrionema furunoi Okamura & Yamachi, 1982
- Chrionema pallidum Parin, 1990
- Chrionema squamentum (Ginsburg, 1955)
- Chrionema squamiceps Gilbert, 1905
