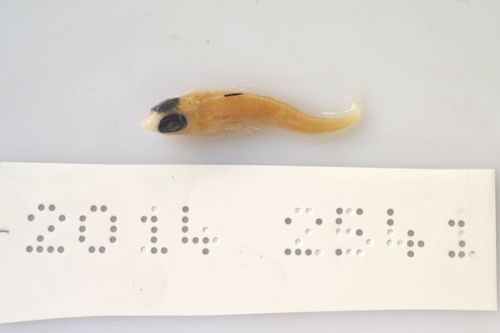
- specimen MNHN-IC--2014-2541, collected off New Caledonia

Scientific classification
- Kingdom: Animalia
- Phylum: Chordata
- Class: Actinopterygii
- Order: Acropomatiformes
- Family: Hemerocoetidae
- Genus: Acanthaphritis; Günther, 1880

Type species
- Acanthaphritis grandisquamis Günther, 1880

Synonyms
- Branchiopsaron McKay, 1971; Spinapsaron Okamura & Kishida, 1963

= Acanthaphritis =

Genus of ray-finned fishes

Acanthaphritis is a genus of ray-finned fish which are part of the family Hemerocoetidae. They have an Indo-Pacific distribution.

== Species ==
There are four recognised species in Acanthaphritis:

- Acanthaphritis barbata (Okamura & Kishida, 1963)
- Acanthaphritis grandisquamis Günther, 1880
- Acanthaphritis ozawai (McKay, 1971)
- Acanthaphritis unoorum Suzuki & Nakabo, 1996
