= Enigmapercis =

Scientific classification
- Kingdom: Animalia
- Phylum: Chordata
- Class: Actinopterygii
- Order: Acropomatiformes
- Family: Hemerocoetidae
- Genus: Enigmapercis; Whitley, 1936

Type species
- Enigmapercis reducta Whitley, 1936

Genus of ray-finned fishes

Enigmapercis is a genus of ray-finned fish which are part of the family Hemerocoetidae. They have an Indo-Pacific distribution.

== Species ==
There are two recognised species in the genus Enigmapercis:

- Enigmapercis acutirostris Parin, 1990
- Enigmapercis reducta Whitley, 1936 - broad sandfish
