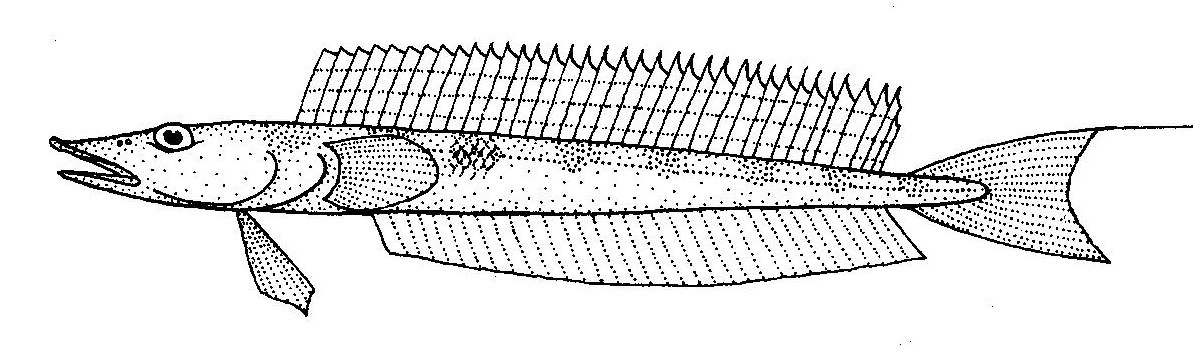
- Opalfish, Hemerocoetes monopterygius

Scientific classification
- Domain: Eukaryota
- Kingdom: Animalia
- Phylum: Chordata
- Class: Actinopterygii
- Order: Acropomatiformes
- Family: Hemerocoetidae
- Genus: Hemerocoetes; Valenciennes in Cuvier and Valenciennes, 1837

Species
- Hemerocoetes artus; Hemerocoetes macrophthalmus; Hemerocoetes monopterygius; Hemerocoetes morelandi; Hemerocoetes pauciradiatus

= Hemerocoetes =

Hemerocoetes Temporal range: 33–0 Ma Early Oligocene to Present

Genus of ray-finned fishes

Hemerocoetes is a genus of ray-finned fishes belonging to the family Hemerocoetidae.
