= Dactylopsaron =

Scientific classification
- Kingdom: Animalia
- Phylum: Chordata
- Class: Actinopterygii
- Order: Acropomatiformes
- Family: Hemerocoetidae
- Genus: Dactylopsaron; Parin, 1990
- Species: D. dimorphicum

Binomial name
- Dactylopsaron dimorphicum Parin & Belyanina, 1990

Genus of ray-finned fishes

Dactylopsaron is a monotypic genus of ray-finned fish from the family Hemerocoetidae. The only species in the genus, Dactylopsaron dimorphicum is found in the eastern South Pacific on the Salas y Gomez ridge and the adjacent part of the Nazca Ridge.
