= Squamicreedia =

Scientific classification
- Kingdom: Animalia
- Phylum: Chordata
- Class: Actinopterygii
- Order: Acropomatiformes
- Family: Hemerocoetidae
- Genus: Squamicreedia; Rendahl, 1921
- Species: S. obtusa

Binomial name
- Squamicreedia obtusa Rendahl, 1921

Genus of ray-finned fishes

Squamicreedia is a genus of ray-finned fishes from the family Hemerocoetidae. It is endemic to waters with sandy sea beds off northern Australia. It is a monotypic genus, containing a single species, Squamicreedia obtusa, the obtuse duckbill or obtuse sandfish.
