= Diphtheritic stomatitis =

Bacterial disease of yellow-eyed penguins

Diphtheritic stomatitis is a recently discovered disease and has thus far been reported only in Yellow-eyed penguins (Megadyptes antipodes). Its symptoms are similar to human diphtheria and is characterized by infectious lesions in the mouth area that impede swallowing and cause respiratory troubles. The infection is caused by Corynebacterium amycolatum, an aerobic Gram-positive bacterium and mainly affects very young chicks. However, it seems likely that a triggering agent (e.g. a virus) might be involved, which renders the corynebacterium a secondary pathogen.

The disease has been a serious cause of mortality in the 2002 and 2004 Yellow-eyed penguin breeding seasons. It seems that only the New Zealand South Island and Stewart Island / Rakiura were affected.

== Signs and symptoms ==
- Almost exclusively seen in Yellow-eyed penguin chicks
- Heavy breathing and signs of weakness
- Yellow caesious exudate within the beak and at the commissures of the mouth
- Yellow diphtheritic membrane covers the hard palate, tongue and buccal mucosa
- Mouth can often not be closed due to lesions, in serious cases tongue exposed

== Diagnosis ==
- Isolation of Corynebacterium amycolatum from a clinical specimen, or
- Histopathologic diagnosis of diphtheria

== Treatment ==
During the latest outbreak of the disease (2004), several treatment methods were tested. Main treatment involved the administration of antibiotics, in some cases glucose solution or dietary mixtures were additionally supplemented. Outcome of the different treatment methods varied greatly. Especially the success of antibiotic treatment and a widespread use on wild animals remains a matter of debate.

== Sources ==
- Summarized from Minutes of "Yellow-eyed Penguin Corynebacterium Workshop" held in Dunedin, Tuesday 5 April 2005
