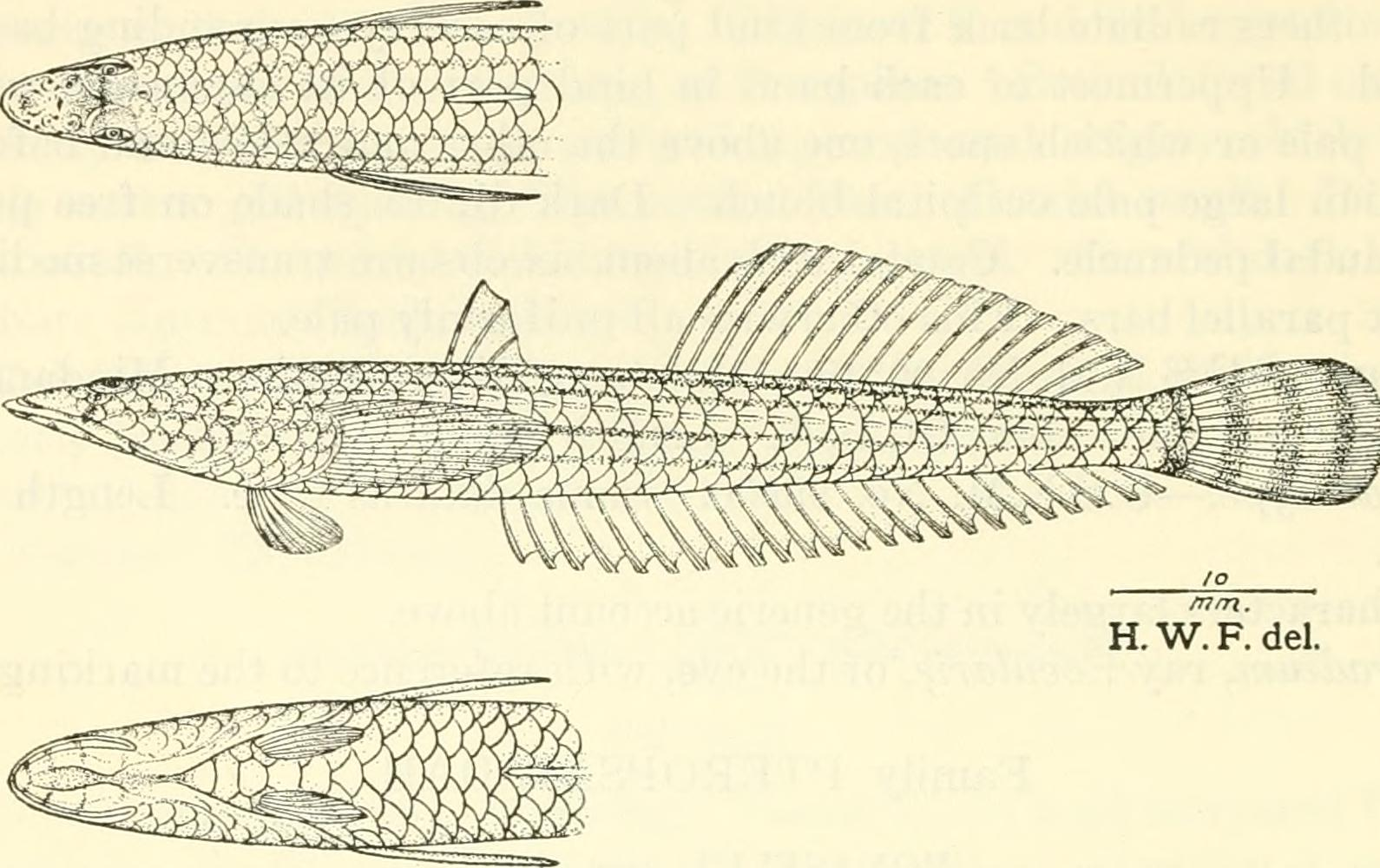
- Matsubaraea fusiforme

Scientific classification
- Kingdom: Animalia
- Phylum: Chordata
- Class: Actinopterygii
- Order: Acropomatiformes
- Family: Hemerocoetidae
- Genus: Matsubaraea; Iw. Taki, 1953
- Species: M. fusiforme

Binomial name
- Matsubaraea fusiforme (Fowler, 1943)

Synonyms
- Matsubaraea setouchiensis Iw. Taki, 1953; Roxasella fusiforme Fowler, 1943

= Matsubaraea =

Genus of ray-finned fishes

Matsubaraea is a monotypic genus of ray-finned fish from the family Hemerocoetidae. The only species in the genus, Matsubaraea fusiforme is found in the western Pacific in the waters around Japan, Thailand and the Philippines on sandy substrates. It feeds on mysids. The generic name honours the Japanese ichthyologist Shinnosuke Matsubara who was director of Imperial Fisheries in Tokyo.
