= Fishes of the World =

Reference book by Joseph S. Nelson

- Author: Joseph S. Nelson
- Language: English
- Genre: Reference
- Publisher: Wiley
- Publication date: 1976

Fishes of the World is a standard reference for the systematics of fishes. It was first written in 1976 by the American ichthyologist Joseph S. Nelson (1937–2011). Now in its fifth edition (2016), the work is a comprehensive overview of the diversity and classification of the 30,000-plus fish species known to science.

The book begins with a general overview of ichthyology, although it is not self-contained. After a short section on Chordata and non-fish taxa, the work lists all known fish families in a systematic fashion. Each family is given at least one paragraph, and usually a body outline drawing; large families have subfamilies and tribes described as well. Notable genera and species are mentioned, though the book does generally not deal with the species-level diversity. The complexities of the higher taxa are described succinctly, with many references for difficult points. The book does not contain any color illustrations.

The first edition appeared in 1976, the second in 1984, the third in 1994 (John Wiley & Sons, ISBN 0-471-54713-1), the fourth in March 2006 (ISBN 0-471-25031-7), and the fifth in April 2016 (ISBN 9781118342336).

The fourth edition was the first to incorporate the wide use of DNA analysis, revising many earlier classifications.
