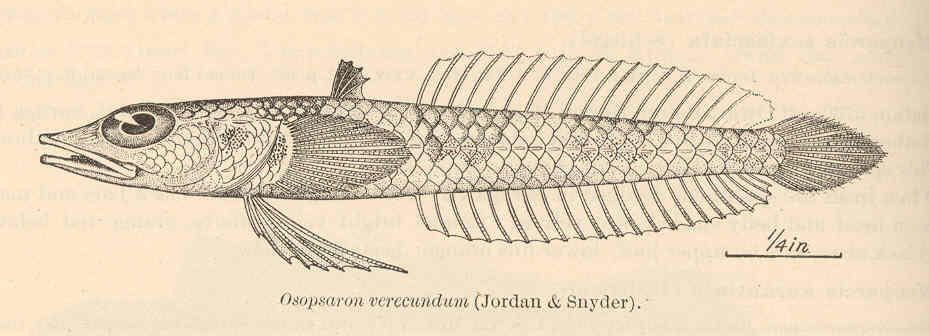
- Pteropsaron verecundum

Scientific classification
- Kingdom: Animalia
- Phylum: Chordata
- Class: Actinopterygii
- Order: Acropomatiformes
- Family: Hemerocoetidae
- Genus: Osopsaron; Jordan & Starks, 1904

Type species
- Pteropsaron verecundum Jordan & Snyder, 1902

= Osopsaron =

Genus of fishes

Osopsaron is a genus of hemerocoetid ray-finned fishes.

== Species ==
There are three species included with the genus Osopsaron:

- Osopsaron formosensis Kao & Shen, 1985
- Osopsaron karlik Parin, 1985
- Osopsaron verecundum (Jordan & Snyder, 1902)
