= Joseph S. Nelson =

Canadian biologist and ichthyologist (1937–2011)

Joseph Schieser Nelson
- Born: April 12, 1937; San Francisco
- Died: August 9, 2011 (aged 74)
- Education: University of Alberta, University of British Columbia
- Known for: Ichthyology, Fishes of the World
- Spouse: Claudine Nelson
- Awards: Alberta Centennial Medal (2006)
- Scientific career
- Workplaces: Department of Biological Sciences, University of Alberta
- Doctoral advisor: Dr. C.C. Lindsey
- Other academic advisors: Dr. J.R. Nursall
- Author abbrev. (zoology): Nelson

Joseph (Joe) Schieser Nelson (April 12, 1937 – August 9, 2011) was a Canadian ichthyologist. He is best known for the book Fishes of the World (1st edition 1976, 4th edition 2006), which is the standard reference in fish systematics and evolution.

Nelson obtained his PhD from University of British Columbia in 1965. He retired in 2002 from the University of Alberta where he made most of his career; he continued to hold position as a Professor Emeritus and stayed scientifically active until his final years.

Outside academia, Nelson was a black belt in karate.

== Legacy ==
Species described by Nelson:

- Bembrops morelandi Nelson, 1978 — New Zealand flathead
- Limnichthys polyactis Nelson, 1978 — Long-finned sand diver
- Hemerocoetes artus Nelson, 1979
- Hemerocoetes morelandi Nelson, 1979
- Psychrolutes sio Nelson, 1980
- Pteropsaron heemstrai Nelson, 1982
- Osopsaron natalensis Nelson, 1982
- Ebinania macquariensis Nelson, 1982
- Ebinania malacocephala Nelson, 1985
- Creedia alleni Nelson, 1983
- Creedia partimsquamigera Nelson, 1983 — Half-scaled sand-diver
- Crystallodytes pauciradiatus Nelson & Randall, 1985
- Cottunculus nudus Nelson, 1989 — Bonyskull toadfish
- Psychrolutes microporos Nelson, 1995 — Blobfish/fathead
- Ambophthalmos eurystigmatephoros Jackson & Nelson, 1999
- Neophrynichthys heterospilos Jackson & Nelson, 2000
- Ebinania australiae Jackson & Nelson, 2006

Species named after Nelson:

- Barilius nelsoni Barman, 1988
- Bembrops nelsoni Thompson & Suttkus, 2002
- Granulacanthus joenelsoni Hanke, Wilson, & Lindoe, 2001
- Myopsaron nelsoni Shibukawa, 2010
