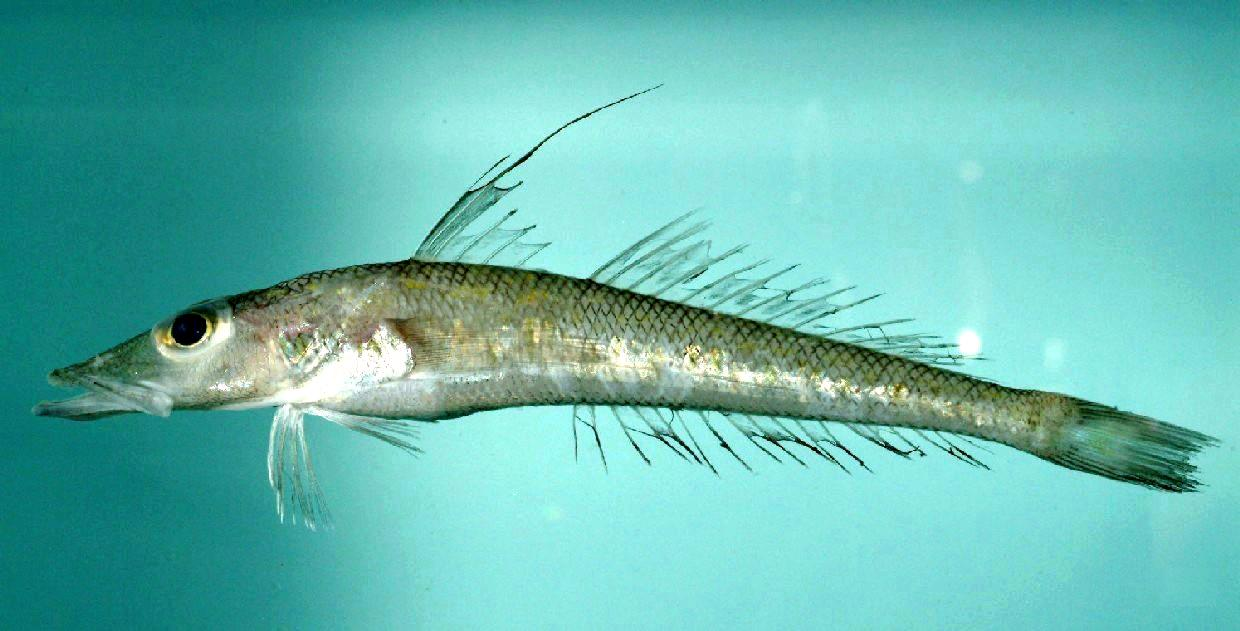
- Longnose duckbill Bembrops anatirostris

Scientific classification
- Kingdom: Animalia
- Phylum: Chordata
- Class: Actinopterygii
- Order: Perciformes
- Suborder: Percoidei
- Family: Bembropidae; Regan, 1913

Genera
- see text

= Bembropidae =

Family of ray-finned fishes

Bembropidae is a family of marine ray-finned fishes in the order Perciformes, native to the Atlantic, Indian, and Pacific Oceans.

== Taxonomy ==
They were formerly placed within the family Percophidae within the now-defunct order Trachiniformes. More recent phylogenetic studies have placed both these families within different clades in the Perciformes: the Percophidae are most closely related to Antarctic icefishes in the Notothenioidei, while the Bembropidae are more closely related to true perches, groupers and seabasses within the Percoidei.

=== Genera ===
There are two genera within the family:

- Bembrops Steindachner, 1876
- Chrionema Gilbert, 1905

== Description ==
The species in the family Bembropidae are elongated, benthic fishes with an anteriorly depressed head, a broad flat snout which gives rise to the common name duckbills. The mouth is large with a prognathous lower jaw and exposed maxilla. They have large closely placed eyes. There are two spines on the opercula and one on subopercula. They have tiny conical teeth on the mandibles and on the vomer and palatine bones. There are two dorsal fins an anterior dorsal fin with 6 slender spines and a posterior dorsal fin with 13 to 18 soft rays, the pelvic fins have 1 weak spine and 5 branched rays and these are positioned anteriorly to the pectoral fins with their bases widely separated. The anal fin has only 15 to 25 soft rays and the pectoral fins have between 20 and 28 rays. They body is covered in ctenoid scales and the lateral line curves underneath the anterior dorsal fin to below the middle of the flank with the 2 or 3 scales nearest the head being keeled. They are generally brownish in colour with indistinct dark blotches along the body. They are benthic, carnivorous fish which are found at depths of 100–600 metres (330–1,970 ft). They are relatively small and uncommon and are of no interest to fisheries.
