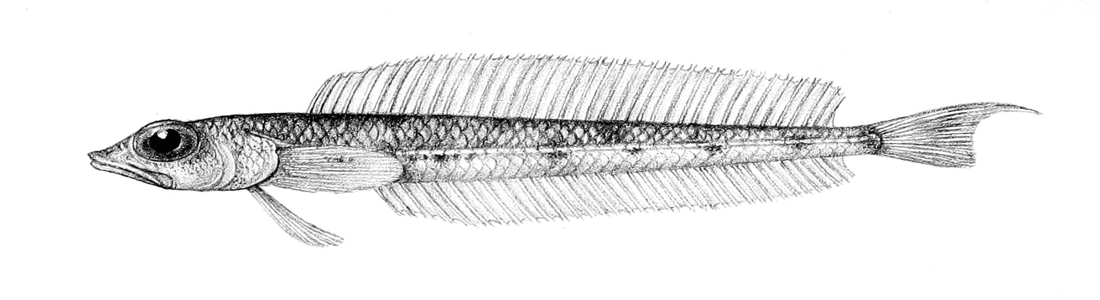
- Hemerocoetes macrophthalmus

Scientific classification
- Kingdom: Animalia
- Phylum: Chordata
- Class: Actinopterygii
- Order: Acropomatiformes
- Family: Hemerocoetidae; Kaup, 1873

= Hemerocoetidae =

Family of ray-finned fishes

Hemerocoetidae is a family of percomorph ray-finned fishes belonging to the order Acropomatiformes.

== Genera ==
The following genera are included within the Hemerocoetidae:

- Acanthaphritis Günther, 1880
- Dactylopsaron Parin, 1990
- Enigmapercis Whitley, 1936
- Hemerocoetes Valenciennes, 1837
- Matsubaraea Taki, 1953
- Osopsaron Jordan & Starks, 1904
- Pteropsaron Jordan & Snyder, 1902
- Squamicreedia Rendahl, 1921
