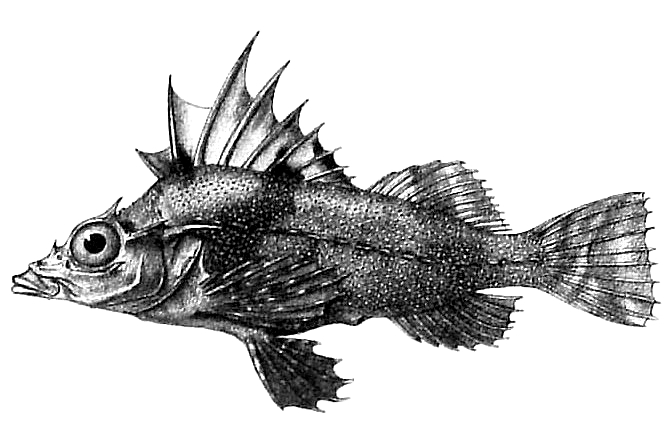
- Zanclorhynchus spinifer

Scientific classification
- Kingdom: Animalia
- Phylum: Chordata
- Class: Actinopterygii
- Order: Perciformes
- Suborder: Scorpaenoidei
- Family: Zanclorhynchidae; Andriashev, 1993

Genera
- Alertichthys Moreland, 1960; Zanclorhynchus Günther, 1880

Synonyms
- Zanclorhynchinae

= Zanclorhynchidae =

Family of fishes

Zanclorhynchidae, the horsefishes, is a family of marine scorpaenoid fish. It contains two genera formerly placed in Congiopodidae. They are native to the Southern Ocean.

== Taxonomy ==
- Family Zanclorhynchidae
  - Genus Alertichthys Moreland, 1960
  - Genus Zanclorhynchus Günther, 1880
