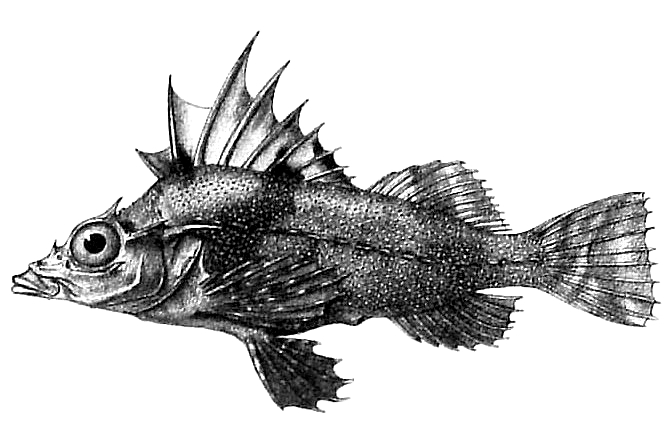

Conservation status
- Least Concern (IUCN 3.1)

Scientific classification
- Kingdom: Animalia
- Phylum: Chordata
- Class: Actinopterygii
- Division: Teleostei
- Order: Perciformes
- Family: Zanclorhynchidae
- Genus: Zanclorhynchus
- Species: Z. spinifer

Binomial name
- Zanclorhynchus spinifer Günther, 1880

= Zanclorhynchus spinifer =

Species of fish

Zanclorhynchus spinifer, also known as the Antarctic horsefish or spiny horsefish, is a species of marine ray-finned fish belonging to the family Congiopodidae, the horsefishes or pigfishes. This fish is found in the Southern Ocean where it occurs at depths of from 5 to 400 metres (16 to 1,312 ft). This species grows to a length of 40 centimetres (16 in) TL and is of minor importance to the commercial fishery industry.

== Taxonomy ==
Zanclorhynchus spinifer was first formally described in 1880 by the German-born British ichthyologist Albert Günther With the type locality given as Kerguelen Island. Günther classified the newly described species in a new monotypic genus, Zanclorhynchus, which remained monotypic until Chereshnev's horsefish (Z. chereshnevi) was described in 2016.

=== Subspecies ===
Zanclorhynchus spinifer has a number of subspecies proposed, these are:

- Zanclorhynchus spinifer armatus Zhukov, 2019 Prince Edward Islands, Crozet Islands
- Zanclorhynchus spinifer heracleus Zhukov & Balushkin, 2018 Hercules Ridge, Central (Umanova) Bank
- Zanclorhynchus spinifer macquariensis Zhukov, 2019 Macquarie Island
- Zanclorhynchus spinifer spinifer Günther, 1880 Kerguelen Island, Heard Island

=== Etymology ===
The specific name spinifer means "bearing spines" referring to the bones of the head having spines on them.

== Description ==
Zanclorhynchus spinifer has between 7 and 10 spines in the first dorsal fin and 12-15 soft rays in the second dorsal fin, the dorsal fin is divided by a deep incision. The anal fin has 10 or 11 soft rays but no spines. There are rows of minute teeth in the jaws. The snout has a spine over each nostril, there are obvious spine at the rear of the bone over the eye, under the eye and to the rear of the eye. There is a highly elongated spine above the operculum. The operculum has three low, radiating ridges ending in spines and there is a further spine on the body at the base of the pectoral fins. There are scattered scales on the upper body and flanks but none on the lower areas. The overall colour is brownish, purple or ochre with small black spots. A black bar runs from the second dorsal fin to the anal fin with another on the front part of the caudal fin. There is a black spot at the base of the first two dorsal fin spines with a black bar extending from the rear of the first dorsal fin down onto the lower body. The fins are yellow with black bars in the centres of the caudal, pectoral and pelvic fins. The maximum recorded total length of this species is 40 cm (16 in).

== Distribution and habitat ==
Zanclorhynchus spiniferis found in the Southern Ocean in the Indian and Pacific sectors. It has been recorded in Australian territories of Macquarie Island and the Heard and McDonald Islands, in the French Southern Territories at Crozet, Kerguelen; and from the South African Marion and Prince Edward Islands. They are also found on seamounts such as the Hercules Rudge and Kara-Dag Seamount. The Antarctic horsefish is a benthic species which has been captured by trawls at depths between 5 and 400 m (16 and 1,312 ft).

== Biology ==
Zanclorhynchus spinifer spends most of the time on the seabed where it hunts for benthic invertebrates, particularly amphipods and it has been recorded from beds of kelp. The post larval juveniles are pelagic and have been found offshore in waters where the sea is 1,500 m (4,900 ft) deep. They have been recorded as prey in the diet of Hooker's sea lions (Phocarctos hookeri) at Macquarie Island.

== Fisheries ==
Zanclorhynchus spinifer is abundant, and is caught as bycatch by trawlers. The flesh is not normally marketed for food but it is converted to fish meal.
