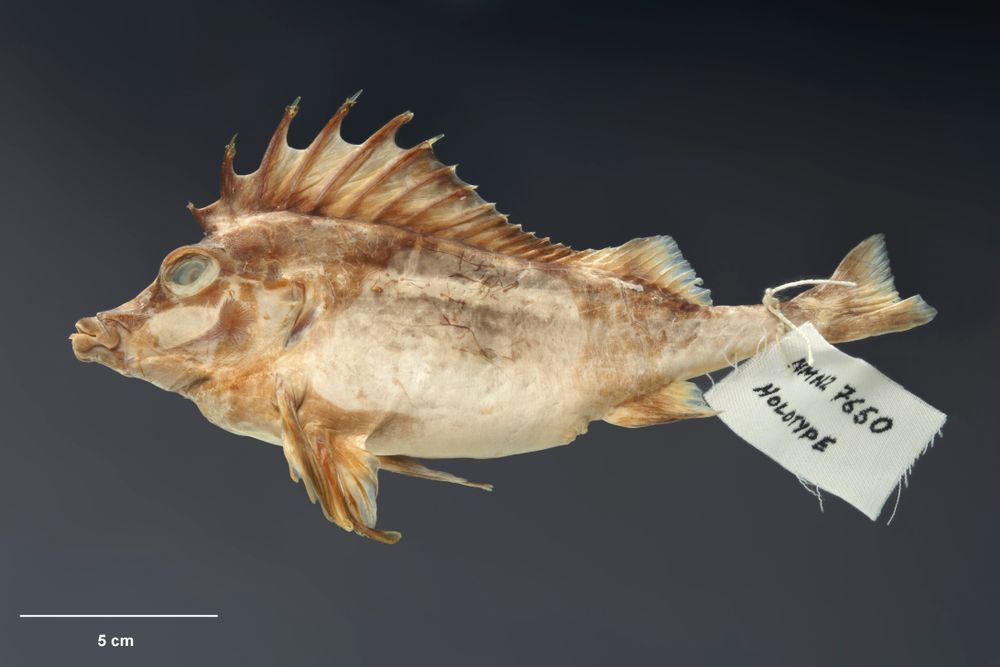

Scientific classification
- Kingdom: Animalia
- Phylum: Chordata
- Class: Actinopterygii
- Order: Perciformes
- Family: Congiopodidae
- Genus: Congiopodus
- Species: C. coriaceus

Binomial name
- Congiopodus coriaceus Paulin & Moreland, 1979

= Deepsea pigfish =

Species of fish

The deepsea pigfish (Congiopodus coriaceus) is a species of marine ray-finned fish belonging to the family Congiopodidae, the horsefishes or pigfishes. It is found around New Zealand, and has been recorded off southern Australia.

== Taxonomy ==
The deep sea pigfish was first formally described in 1979 by Chris D. Paulin and John M. Moreland with the type locality given as the Campbell Island Rise at 52°56.1'S, 169°55.1'E. The specific name coriaceus means "leathery", an allusion to the authors' description of this species as having "thick, smooth, leathery skin".

== Description ==
The deepsea pigfish has smooth skin on the body and its anal fin contains no spines. the profile of the head between the eye and the origin of the dorsal fin is angled at around 45° from the horizontal. It has a light coloured horizontal stripe along the flanks running from just behind the head and petering out on the caudal peduncle. The overall colour is brownish ading to cream ventrally. There are 16 to 18 spines, the fifth spine being the longest, and 12 to 14 soft rays in the dorsal fin while the anal fin has between 9 and 11 soft rays. This species reaches a maximum fork length of at least 32 cm (13 in),

== Distribution and habitat ==
The deepsea pigfish is found in the south western Pacific Ocean in the waters off New Zealand as far north as the Chatham Rise, it has also been recorded in the Great Australian Bight where it may have been previously misidentified as the Southern pigfish which has been claimed to occur there but there are no specimens of that species in Australian museums. This is a bathydemersal species found in deep waters, at depths between 140 and 390 m (460 and 1,280 ft).
