= John Yaldwyn =

New Zealand carcinologist and director of the National Museum of New Zealand

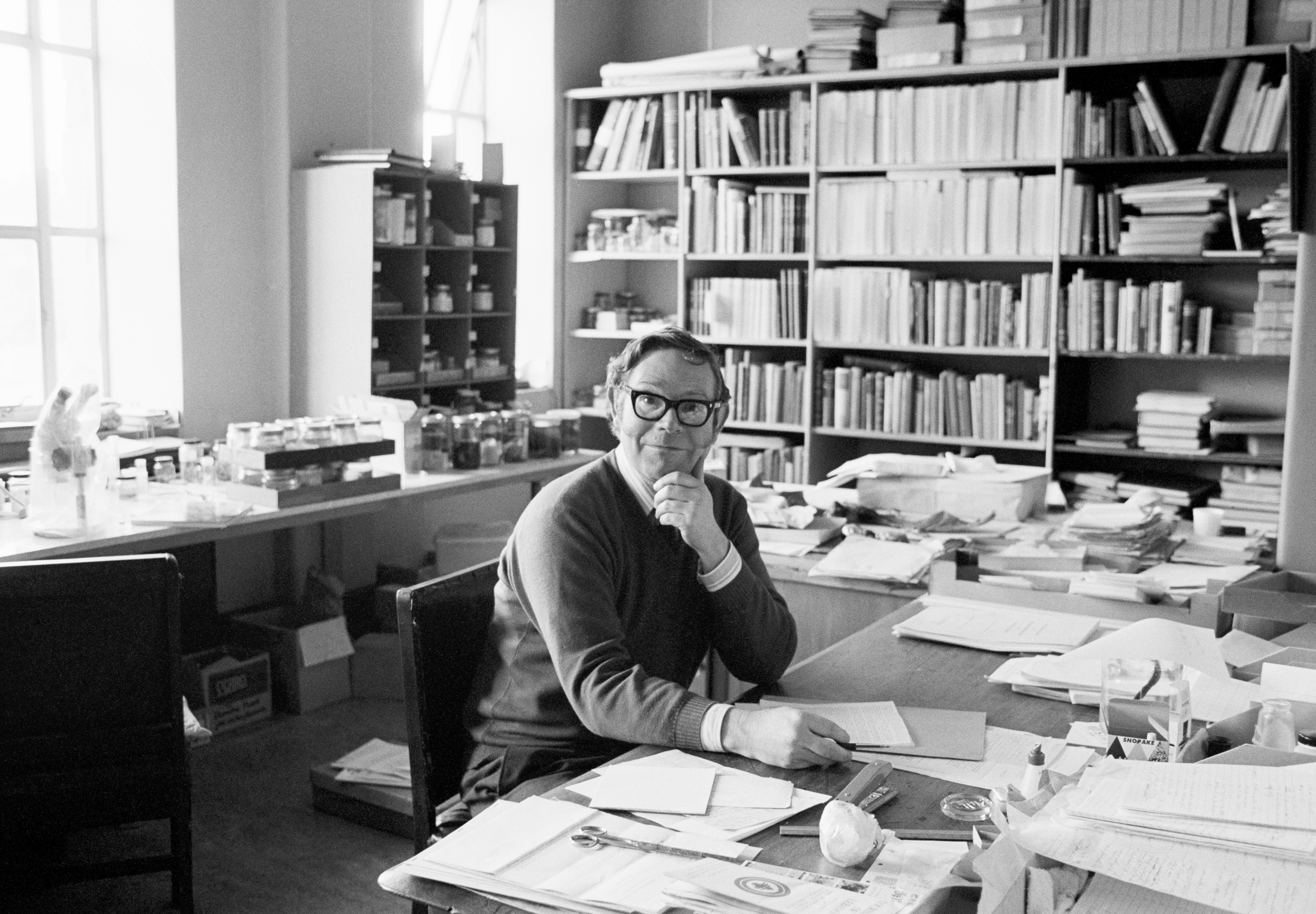
- John Yaldwyn, when Assistant Director of the National Museum, 1976.
- Born: John Cameron Yaldwyn; 31 December 1929; Wellington, New Zealand
- Died: 9 October 2005 (aged 75); Wellington, New Zealand
- Education: Victoria University of Wellington; University of Southern California,
- Partner: Barbara Mary Haldane (m. 1956–2003)
- Scientific career
- Fields: Carcinology
- Workplaces: Australian Museum; National Museum of New Zealand

John Cameron Yaldwyn (31 December 1929 – 9 October 2005) was a New Zealand carcinologist who made significant contributions to the study of New Zealand crustacea and was the director of the National Museum of New Zealand, leading that institution from 1980 to 1989, prior to its reformation as Te Papa.

== Early life and education ==
John Yaldwyn was born in Wellington to John Bradley Yaldwyn, a barrister and chairman of the Local Government Commission, and Flora Morison Yaldwyn. From an early age his interest in natural history was fostered by the local environment of eastern Wellington.

From 1949 to 1958 Yaldwyn studied zoology at Victoria University under the parasitologist and ichthyologist L. R. Richardson. His MSc and PhD theses on New Zealand shrimps and prawns were published in 1954 and 1959.

== Career ==
In 1954 Yaldwyn was a member of the 1954 Chatham Islands expedition where he studied crustacea. He returned to the Dominion Museum as Assistant Director in 1969. The Dominion Museum was renamed the National Museum of New Zealand in 1973, and Yaldwyn became its Director in 1980.

He retired as Museum Director in 1989. He continued working at Te Papa as an Honorary Research Associate until shortly before his death, managing to finish several projects that been started earlier in his career.

== Selected publications ==
- John S Garth; Janet Haig; J C Yaldwyn (16 February 1967). "The Decapod Crustacea of the Royal Society Expedition to Southern Chile, 1958-59*". Transactions of the Royal Society of New Zealand, zoology. 8 (16): 169–186. ISSN 0372-1396. Wikidata Q88303924.
- John Cameron Yaldwyn (1954), A preliminary survey of the New Zealand crustacea Decapoda Natantia with an appendix on the Reptant Genus Nephrops..., Victoria University of Wellington, Wikidata Q127415457
- John Cameron Yaldwyn (1959), The New Zealand natant decapod crustacea ; systematics, distributionand relationships, Victoria University of Wellington, Wikidata Q127415804

== See also ==
- List of carcinologists
