= Rosemary Rock =

Coordinates: 34°10′55″S 172°03′22″E

Rosemary Rock is a rugged islet, 170 m long by 40 m across at sea level, rising to about 50 m. It is the smallest of the Princes Chain of the Three Kings archipelago lying 57 km off the north-western tip of New Zealand’s North Island. It is named after the yacht Rosemary, which transported researchers to the Three Kings group in the late 1940s and early 1950s.

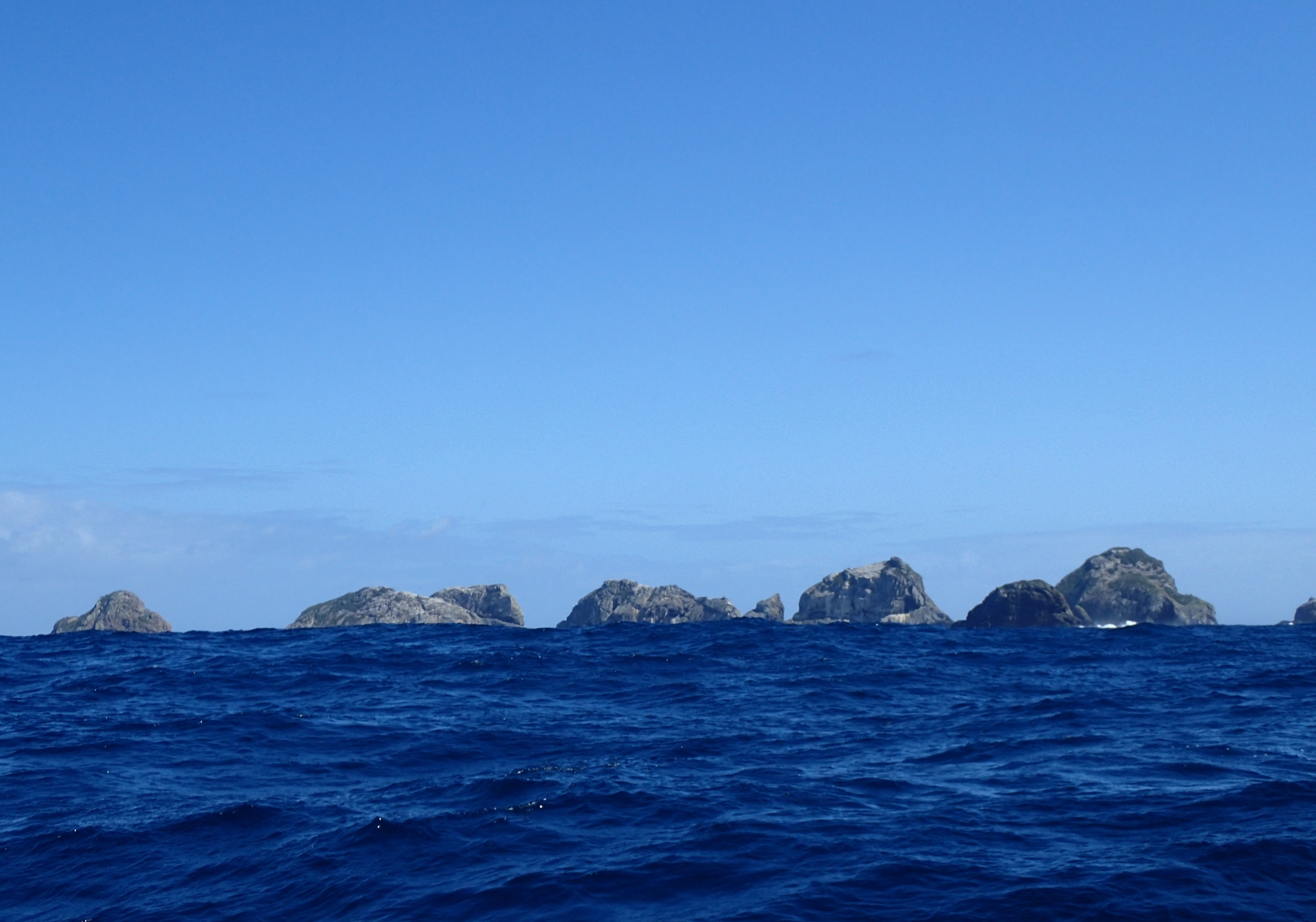
Rosemary Rock - Dark Dome-Shaped Island in the foreground of the island group, 4/5 of the way across the horizon

== Flora and fauna ==
Plants recorded from the islet include a glasswort (Salicornia australis), New Zealand iceplant, shore groundsel, taupata and a goosefoot (Chenopodium allanii). It is a breeding site for a small colony, only discovered in 1983, of about 20 pairs of northern Buller's albatrosses (Thalassarche bulleri platei), the only known breeding site for the subspecies away from the Chatham Islands. It also has a large colony of red-billed gulls.

== See also ==
- Desert island
- List of islands
