= MV Alert =

Vessel operated in New Zealand

MV Alert was a vessel launched in 1942 and originally constructed in Everett, Washington as a harbour defence vessel. Alert arrived in New Zealand as a result of the American lend-lease scheme and was based in Wellington. After World War II she was laid up in Auckland. In 1946 Alexander J. Black purchased the vessel, overhauled her and then based her at Dunedin, where she was used in multiple research expeditions including the 1954 Chatham Islands expedition.
