= Forty-Fours =

Islands containing the easternmost point of New Zealand

Motchuhar (Moriori) Motuhara (Māori)
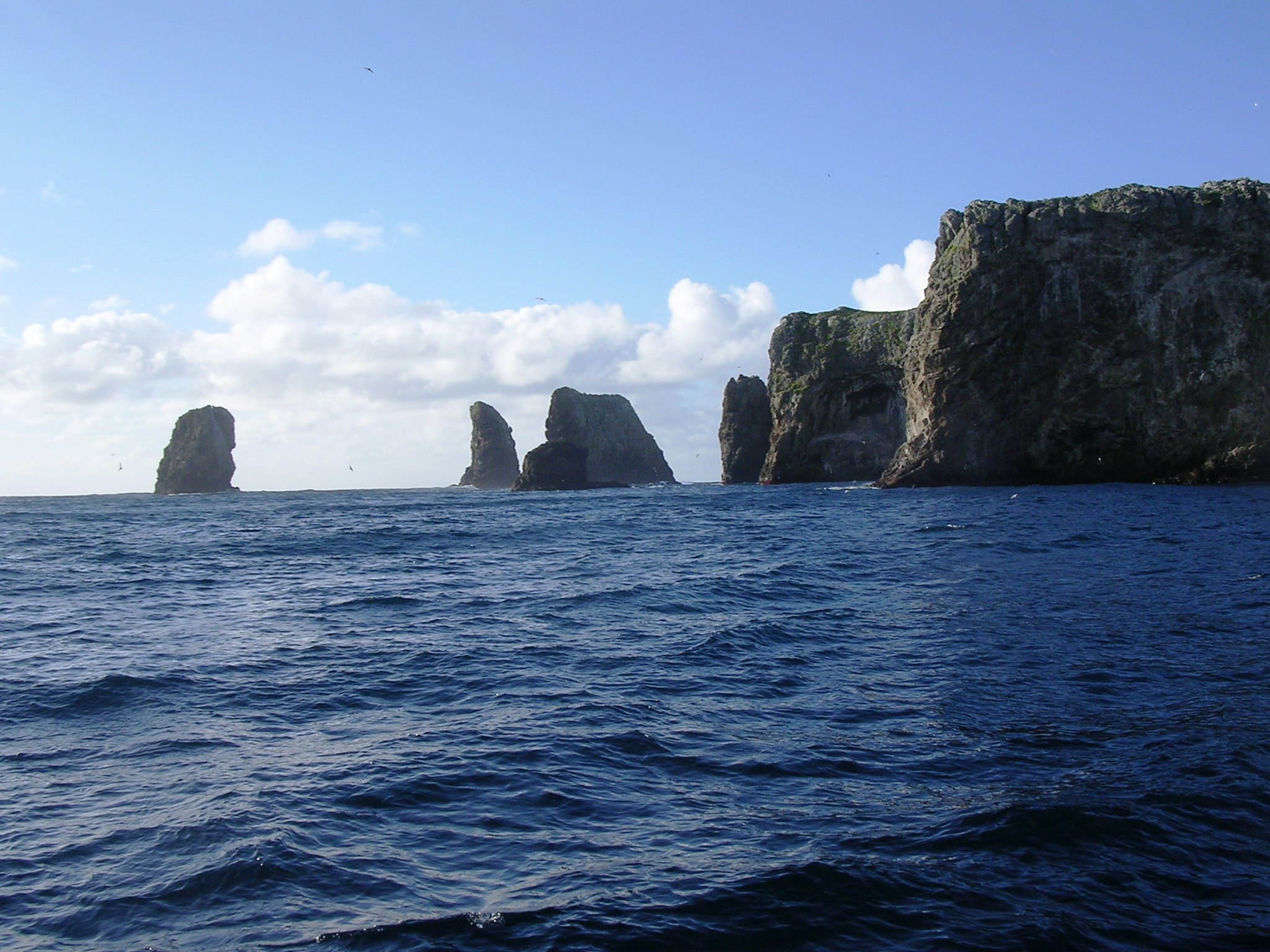
- Forty-Fours/Motuhara from the North

- Map showing location of Forty-Fours/Motuhara

Geography
- Coordinates: 43°57′44″S 175°50′01″W
- Archipelago: Chatham Islands

Administration
- New Zealand

The Forty-Fours are a group of islands in the Chatham Archipelago, about 50 kilometres (31 mi) east of the main Chatham Island. They are called Motchuhar in Moriori and Motuhara in Māori. The group includes the easternmost point of New Zealand, whose South Island is located about 800 kilometres (497 mi) to the west.

Scientists on the 1954 Chatham Islands expedition visited the islands recording prolific bird life including albatrosses and mollymawks.

The region is one of only two breeding sites for the Chatham fulmar prion. It has been identified as an Important Bird Area by BirdLife International due to it also supporting colonies of Buller's and northern royal albatrosses.

== See also ==
- Desert island
- List of islands
