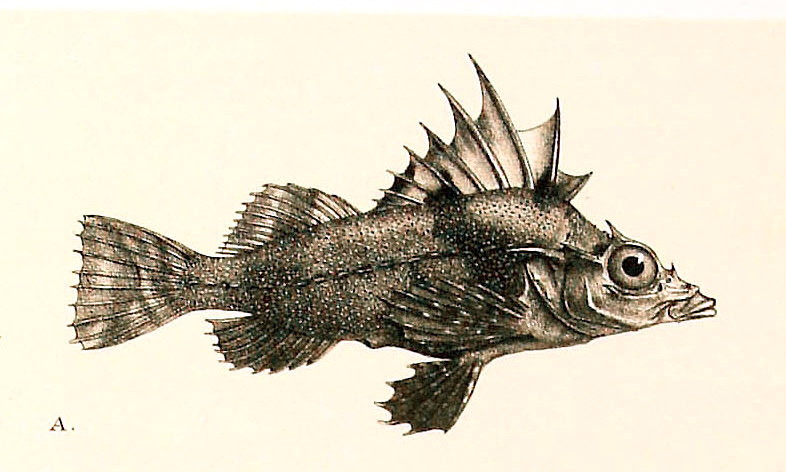

Scientific classification
- Kingdom: Animalia
- Phylum: Chordata
- Class: Actinopterygii
- Order: Perciformes
- Family: Zanclorhynchidae
- Genus: Zanclorhynchus; Günther, 1880

Type species
- Zanclorhynchus spinifer Günther, 1880

= Zanclorhynchus =

Genus of fishes

Zanclorhynchus is a genus of marine ray-finned fishes belonging to the family Congiopodidae, the pigfishes or horsefishes. These fishes are found in the Southern Ocean.

== Taxonomy ==
Zanclorhynchus was first described as a genus in 1880 by the German-born British ichthyologist Albert Günther as a monotypic genus, its only member being the new species Günther described in the same paper, Zanclorhynchus spinifer, with its type locality given as Kerguelen Island. The 5th edition of Fishes of the World classifies this genus in the family Congiopodidae but other authorities classify it within the family Zanclorhynchidae, alongside the genus Alertichthys. The genus name is a compound of zanklon, which means "sickle", and rhynchus, meaning "snout", assumed to be an allusion to the pointed snout of adult Z. spinifer.

== Species ==
Zanclorhynchus contains 2 recognised species:

- Zanclorhynchus chereshnevi Balushkin & Zhukov, 2016 (Chereshnev's horsefish)
- Zanclorhynchus spinifer Günther, 1880 (Antarctic horsefish)

== Characteristics ==
Zanclorhynchus horsefishes are characterised by having robust spines on the head. They have between 8 and 10 spines and 12 and 15 soft rays in the dorsal fin with a deep incision separating the spiny part from the soft rayed part. The origin of the dorsal fin sits over the operculum. There are no spines in the anal fin and the pelvic fins are located on the abdomen, halfway between the throat and the anus. They have scales embedded in the skin, the scales all having a central spine which is curved. The maximum recorded total length is 40 cm (16 in).

== Distribution and habitat ==
Zanclorhynchus horsefishes are found in the Southern Ocean where they have been recorded from Prince Edward Islands, Crozet Islands, Kerguelen Islands, Heard Island and Macquarie Island as well as from the Kara-Dag Seamount to the north-east of the Prince Edward Islands. They are demersal fishes found at depths from 5 to 1,000 m (16 to 3,281 ft).
