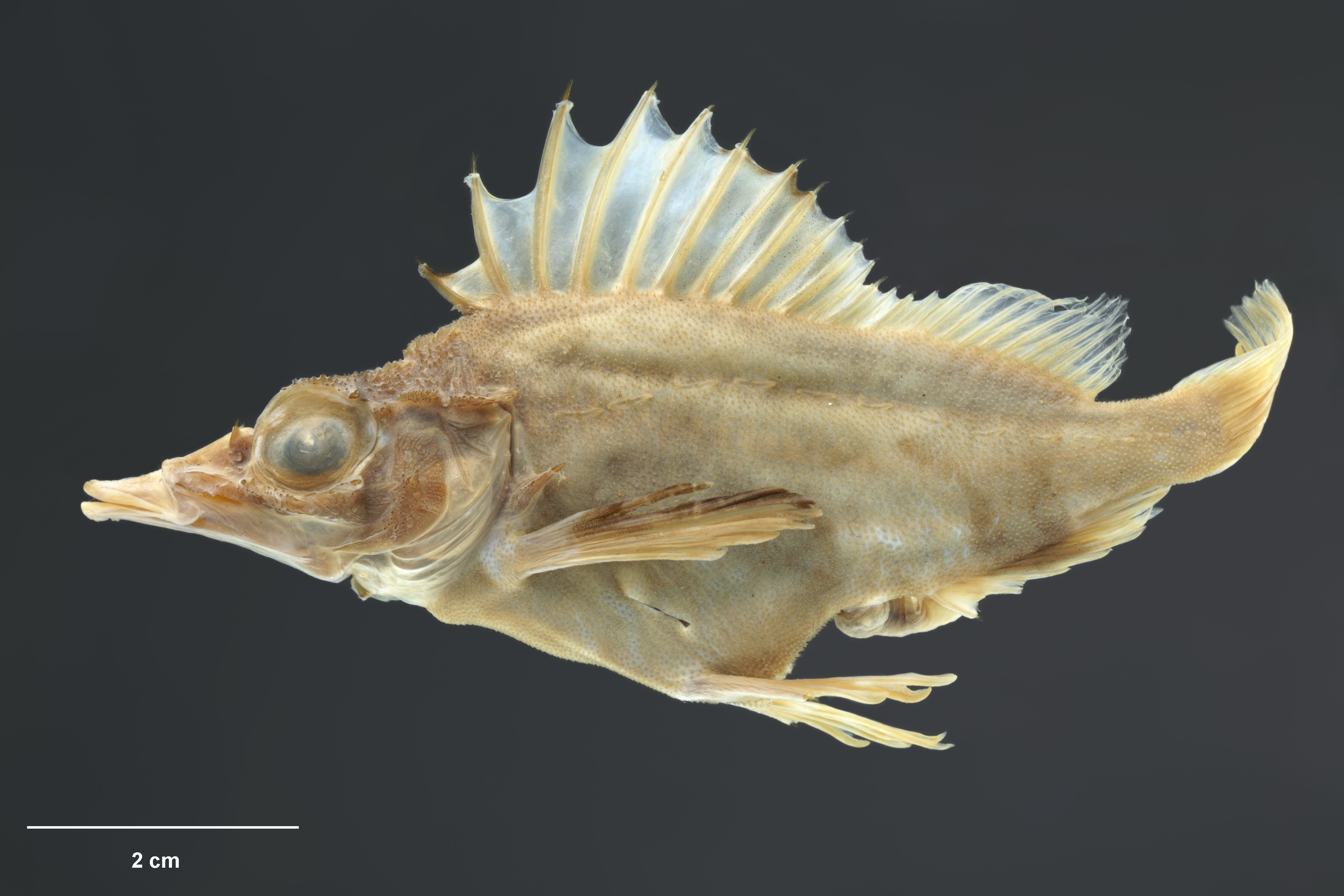
- specimen in the fish collection of Museum of New Zealand Te Papa Tongarewa

Scientific classification
- Kingdom: Animalia
- Phylum: Chordata
- Class: Actinopterygii
- Order: Perciformes
- Family: Zanclorhynchidae
- Genus: Alertichthys; Moreland, 1960
- Species: A. blacki

Binomial name
- Alertichthys blacki Moreland, 1960

= Alert pigfish =

Species of fish

The Alert pigfish (Alertichthys blacki) is a species of marine ray finned fish, a pigfish belonging to the family Congiopodidae. It is the only species in the monotypic genus Alertichthys. This species is endemic to the waters around New Zealand.

== Taxonomy ==
The Alert pigfish was first formally described in 1960 by the New Zealand ichthyologist John Munne Moreland with they type locality given as east of the Otago Peninsula at 45°47'S, 171°7'E. Moreland placed his new species in the monotypic genus Alertichthys. The 5th edition of Fishes of the World classifies Alertichthys within the family Congiopodidae but other authorities classify this genus and Zanclorhynchus within the family Zanclorhynchidae. These fishes are classified within the subfamily Scorpaenoidei within the order Scorpaeniformes. in the Fishes of the World but other authorities place the Scorpaenoidei within the Perciformes. The genus name is a combination of Alert, the name of the research vessel the holotype was collected on, and ichthys, Greek for "fish", while the specific name honours Alex J. Black of Dunedin, the owner and captain of the M/V Alert.

== Description ==
The Alert pigfish has a relatively long snout with a small terminal mouth. The body has rough, leathery skin with no no scales. The continuous dorsal fin is long based. The 2 anal fin spines are absent in the sympatric Congiopodus species. The maximum total length is 20 cm (7.9 in). The overall colour is silvery grey, paler on the lower body and with a dark forward margin to the pectoral fins.

== Distribution and habitat ==
The Alert pigfish is known only from the waters of southern and central New Zealand as far north as the Chatham Rise. It is a demersal fish which lives at depths between 100 and 600 m (330 and 1,970 ft).
