= 1954 Chatham Islands expedition =

Research expedition to the Chatham Islands in 1954

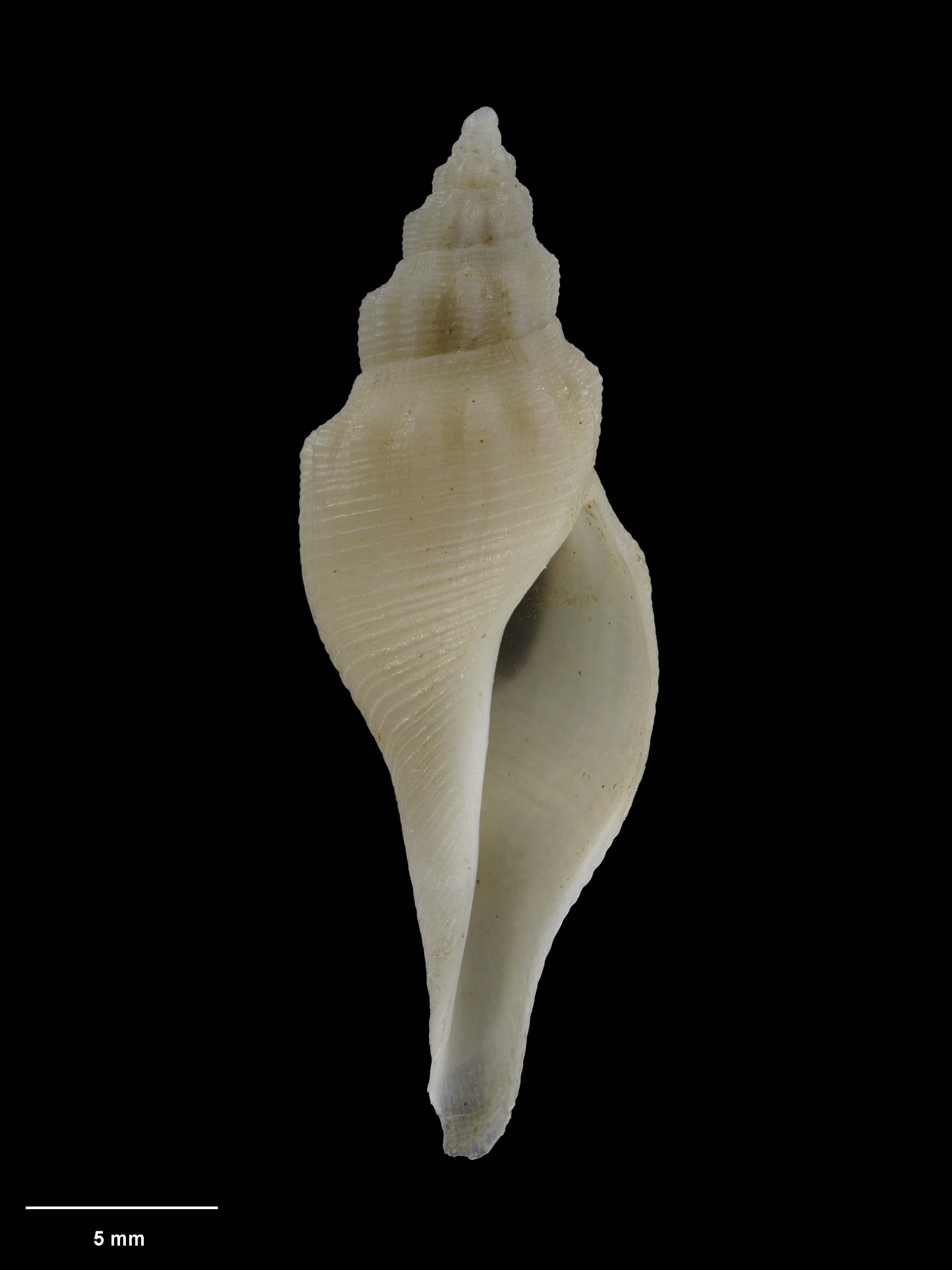
- Country: New Zealand
- Location: Chatham Islands
- Country of origin: New Zealand
- Start: Lyttelton; 22 January 1954
- End: Lyttelton; 12 February 1954
- Leader: George Knox
- Organiser: George Knox
- Funder: Council of Scientific and Industrial Research; University of Canterbury; Canterbury Museum; Dominion Museum; Royal Society of New Zealand Canterbury Branch; Royal Society of New Zealand Southland Branch
- Vessels: MV Alert
- Participants: John Yaldwyn; Richard Dell; Betty Batham; George Knox; Ray Forster; Elliot Watson Dawson; John Munne Moreland; David McNiven Garner

The 1954 Chatham Islands expedition was a research expedition organised by George Knox of the University of Canterbury to explore the distribution of benthic and pelagic marine fauna living between the Chatham Islands / Rēkohu and the eastern coast of New Zealand.

== Origin ==
The idea for the expedition came from George Knox. Funding was received from the New Zealand Oceanographic Committee, via the Department of Scientific and Industrial Research (DSIR).

== Expedition ==
The expedition took place in January and February 1954. The vessel used to undertake this expedition was the MV Alert. The Alert, which had been used for other scientific expeditions, was specially fitted out for this expedition with dredging and trawling equipment, a winch and specially designed sorting benches.

On its way to the Chathams the expedition did oceanographic work on the Mernoo Bank on the Chatham Rise, the area of sea bed between Banks Peninsula and the Chatham Islands. They visited a number of locations on Rekohu (the main island) including Owenga, Kaingaroa, Waitangi, Petre Bay, Te Whanga Lagoon and Port Hutt. Scientists also landed on the smaller islands of South East (Rangatira) Island, Pitt Island, The Sisters and the Forty-Fours.

== Members ==
- John Yaldwyn, crustacea
- Richard Dell, molluscs
- George Alexander Knox, polychaetes
- David McNiven Garner, hydrology
- Ray Forster, terrestrial invertebrates
- Betty Batham, marine biology
- Daphne Marshall, photographer
- John Munne Moreland, marine ichthyologist
- John McIntyre, marine biology
- Elliot Watson Dawson, oceanography and birds
- A.J. Black, ship's master

Members of the expedition came from several different institutions: University of Canterbury, Canterbury Museum, Dominion Museum, Victoria University, the DSIR, Portobello Marine Laboratory and the University of Otago Medical School.

== Results ==
The expedition collected thousands of specimens of both land and marine fauna including over 150 new species. Over 1200 specimens from the expedition are held by Te Papa. Photographs taken by Dawson are held in the Alexander Turnbull Library.

Dell named a deep water snail after the expedition ship and its master Alertalex blacki while another snail was named Chathamidia expeditionis after the expedition.

== Bibliography ==
The following publications resulted from the expedition:

- Yaldwyn, John (1954). "Nephrops challengeri Balss, 1914, (Crustacea, Decapoda, Reptantia) from New Zealand and Chatham Island Waters". Transactions and Proceedings of the Royal Society of New Zealand. 82: 721 – via Papers Past.
- Knox, G. A. (1954). "The Intertidal Flora and Fauna of the Chatham Islands". Nature. 174 (4436): 871–873. doi:10.1038/174871a0. ISSN 0028-0836.
- Dawson, E.W. (1955). "Birds of the Chatham Islands". Notornis. 6 (3): 78–82.
- Brewin, Beryl I. (1956). "Ascidians from the Chatham Islands and the Chatham Rise". Transactions and Proceedings of the Royal Society of New Zealand. 84: 121 – via Papers Past.
- Knox, G. A. (1957). General account of the Chatham Islands 1954 expedition by G.A. Knox. New Zealand. Department of Scientific Industrial Research.
- Pike, R. B. (1961). A new bopyrid parasite collected by the Chatham Islands 1954 expedition. New Zealand. Marine Department.
- Biological results of the Chatham Islands 1954 expedition. (1960–1972). Wellington: New Zealand Department of Scientific and Industrial Research. Parts 1–7.

== See also ==
- 1924 Chatham Islands expedition
