= David McNiven Garner =

New Zealand physicist and oceanographer (1928–2016)

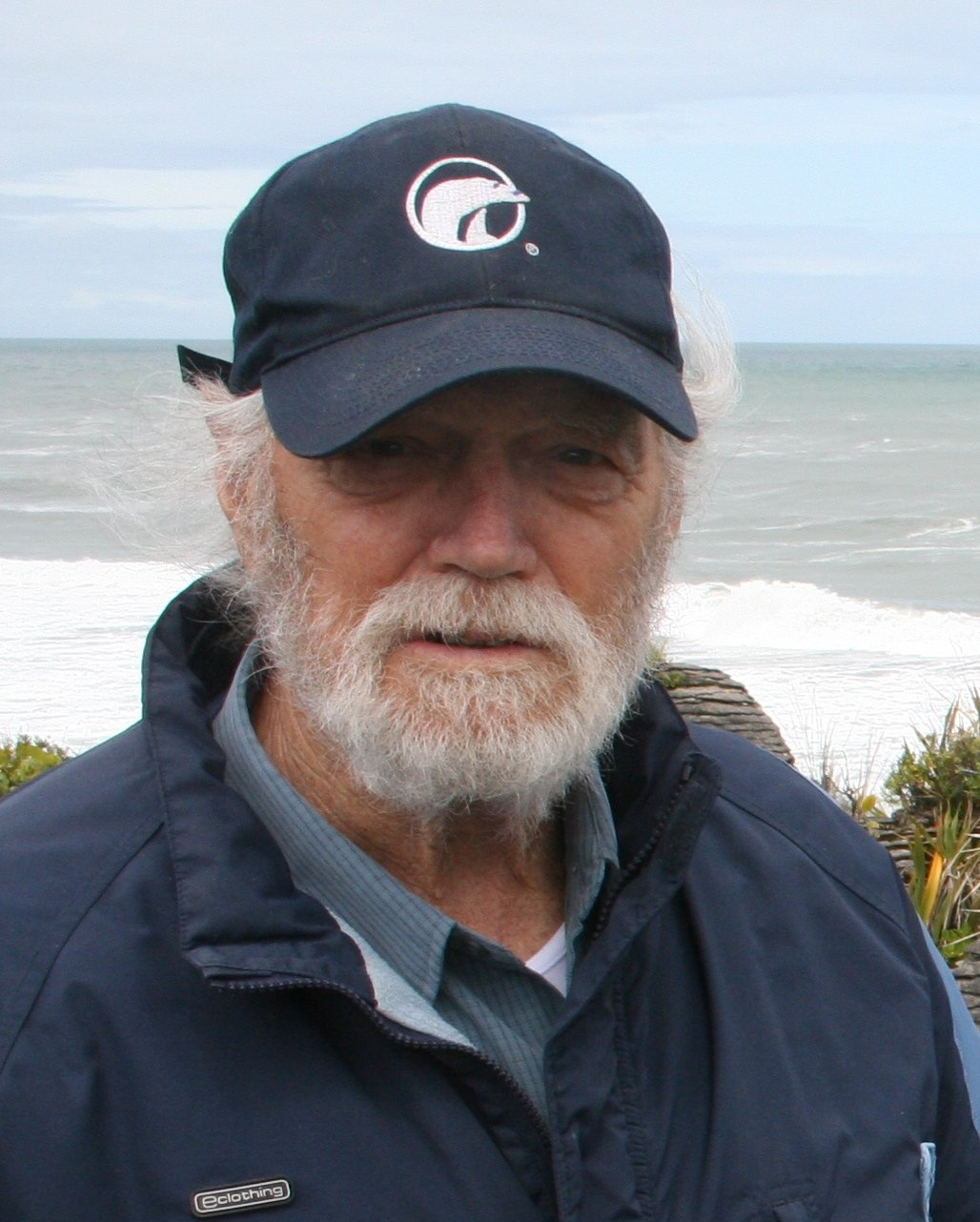
- Garner, taken at Pancake Rocks, near Punakaiki, Westland, New Zealand in 2008
- Born: 26 November 1928; Wanganui, New Zealand
- Died: 13 May 2016 (aged 87); Dunedin, New Zealand
- Education: Victoria University; New York University
- Scientific career
- Fields: Physical oceanography
- Workplaces: Department of Scientific and Industrial Research, New Zealand; Bedford Institute of Oceanography; University of Auckland

David McNiven Garner (26 November 1928 – 13 May 2016) was a New Zealand research physicist, with a focus in physical oceanography and ocean circulation.

== Biography ==
After leaving secondary school in 1946, Garner could not get into university because of a preference for World War II returned servicemen, so he got a job for a year (1946–47) on the Meteorological Sounding Team Canterbury Project on radar meteorology with the Department of Scientific and Industrial Research, based at the Ashburton Aerodrome. The New Zealand National Film Unit made a short film of the activities for its Weekly Review which showed in cinemas as a short subject. The film shows him getting into an Avro Anson, and working with a kite on the back of a truck, and a trawler.

Garner attended Canterbury College, then moved to Wellington where he graduated BSc and MSc from the Victoria College of the University of New Zealand. After graduation he was employed doing sunspot research at the Carter Observatory in Kelburn, Wellington, from where he published his first scientific paper. In 1954 while employed by the Oceanographic Institute of the Department of Scientific and Industrial Research Garner was an hydrologist on the 1954 Chatham Islands expedition. He attended New York University from 1959 to 1962, where he graduated with a PhD in physics on 22 October 1962. He returned to New Zealand in 1962, joining a team of scientists that founded the New Zealand Oceanographic Institute of the Department of Scientific and Industrial Research (today known as National Institute of Water and Atmospheric Research), then located in Hobson Street, Wellington, New Zealand.

Garner immigrated with his family to Canada in 1968, as a physical oceanographer in the ocean circulation department at the Bedford Institute of Oceanography in Nova Scotia, Canada from February 1968 to July 1971, where his topics of research included effects around the Mid-Atlantic Ridge. He worked extensively on the oceanographic research vessels CSS Dawson and CSS Hudson (Canadian Scientific Ship, painted Survey Ship white, and run by the Bedford Institute of Oceanography), which today is the CCGS Hudson. His voyages included a portion of the first ever circumnavigation of North and South America by the CSS Hudson in 1970, on which he was a watch keeper, not a scientist.

Garner returned with his family to New Zealand in 1971, where he was a senior lecturer at the University of Auckland Physics Department from approximately July 1971 to 1974. During his tenure, he worked on the physical oceanographic aspects of an ecological impact report by the university for Shell BP Todd Maui in their offshore drilling operations.

== Personal ==
Garner was the father of three children by Edna Jean Garner: including Mary Ann Garner, John David Garner and Steven James Garner. His wife was Kirsty Garner. Garner died on 13 May 2016.

== Scientific publications ==
- 1952: Seasonal Variation in the Aurora Australis, NZ J Sci Tech
- 1953: Physical Characteristics of Inshore surface waters between Cook Strait and Banks Peninsula, New Zealand, N.Z. J. Sci. Tech. B35: 239–46.
- 1957: Hydrology of Chatham Rise, in N.Z. Department of Scientific and Industrial Research Bulletin 122: 18–27
- 1959: The Sub-tropical Convergence in New Zealand Coastal Waters. New Zealand Journal of Geology and Geophysics. 2: 315–37
- 1959: A section of Carbon-14 activities of sea water between 9 deg south and 66 deg south in the south-west Pacific Ocean. New Zealand Journal of Geology and Geophysics
- 1960: Hydrology of New Zealand Coastal Waters 1955. N.Z. Department of Scientific and Industrial Research Bulletin 138.
- 1962: Biological results of the Chatham Islands 1954 expedition: Part 5 Bergquist, PR; Pike, RB; Hurley, DE; Ralph, PM; Garner, DM New Zealand Oceanographic Institute Memoir [N.Z. Oceanogr. Inst. Mem.]. no. 13, 60 pp. 1961.
- 1962: Analysis of hydrological observations in the New Zealand region, 1874–1955.
- 1962: The average horizontal wind driven mass transport of the Atlantic for February as obtained by numerical methods. Scientific report under contract Nonr 285(03), New York University, College of Engineering, Research Division.
- 1962: Some Studies on the Ocean Circulation Dissertation in the Department of Meteorology and Oceanography submitted to the faculty of the Graduate School of Arts and Science in partial fulfillment of the requirements for the degree of Doctor of Philosophy at New York University.
- 1965: Hydrology of New Zealand offshore waters.
- 1967: Hydrology of the Hikurangi Trench region. Mere. N.Z. Oceanogr. Inst. 39, Wellington, 177 pp.
- 1967: Hydrology of the south-east Tasman Sea.
- 1967: The fauna of the Ross Sea. Part 5. General accounts, station lists, and benthic ecology. Bullivant, JS; Dearborn, JH; Garner, DM New Zealand Oceanographic Institute Memoir [N.Z. Oceanogr. Inst. Mem.]. no. 32, 77 pp. 1967.
- 1969: The geopotential topography of the ocean surface around New Zealand. N.Z.J. Mar. Freshwater Res., 3, 209 219.
- 1969: The Mid-Atlantic Ridge near 45 degrees N:(4) Water properties in the median valley. Garner, D.M., Ford, W.L. Canadian Journal of Earth Sciences, 1969, v.6 pp. 1359–1363
- 1969: Vertical surface acceleration in a wind-generated sea. Garner, D.M. Deutsche hydrographische zeitschrift, 1969, v.22 pp. 163–168
- 1970: Hydrological studies in the New Zealand region 1966 and 1967. Department of Scientific Industrial Research & Foundation for Research, Science & Technology.
- 1970: Vertical surface acceleration in a wind-generated sea. Ocean Dynamics Volume 22, Number 4 / July 1969. See also Deutsche hydrographische Zeitschrift 22(4): 163–8
- 1972: Flow through the Charlie-Gibbs fracture zone, Mid-Atlantic Ridge. Garner, D.M. Canadian Journal of Earth Sciences, 1972, v. 9, pp. 116–121
- 1973: The meridional distribution of silicate in the western Atlantic Ocean. Mann, C.R., Coote, A.R., Garner, D.M. Deep-Sea Research and Oceanographic Abstracts, 1973, v.20, pp. 791–801
