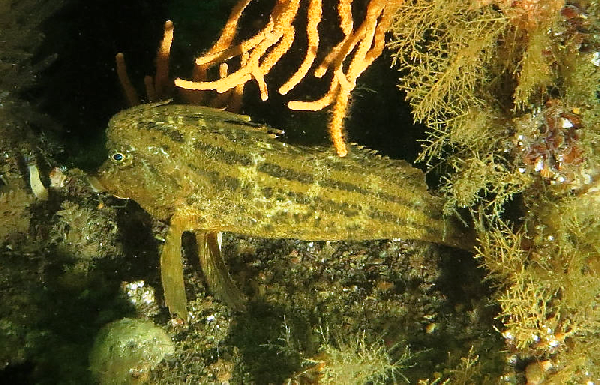

Conservation status
- Least Concern (IUCN 3.1)

Scientific classification
- Kingdom: Animalia
- Phylum: Chordata
- Class: Actinopterygii
- Order: Perciformes
- Family: Congiopodidae
- Genus: Congiopodus
- Species: C. torvus

Binomial name
- Congiopodus torvus (Gronow, 1772)

Synonyms
- Cephalinus glaber Gronow, in Gray, 1854; Blennius torvus Gronow, 1772; Congiopodus percatus Perry, 1811; Agriopus unicolor Burton, 1835; Agriopus verrucosus Cuvier, 1829

= Smooth horsefish =

Species of ray-finned fish

The smooth horsefish (Congiopodus torvus) is a species of marine ray-finned fish belonging to the family Congiopodidae, the horsefishes or pigfishes. It is found in the waters off Southern Africa.

== Taxonomy ==
The smooth horsefish was first formally described as Blennius torvus in 1772 by the Dutch zoologist Laurens Theodoor Gronow with the type locality given, probably in error, as the Indian Ocean. In 1811 the English naturalist George Perry described a new species, Congiopodus percatus which he classified in a new monotypic genus, Congiopodus. This taxon was subsequently considered to be a junior synonym of Gronow's Blennius torvus, so this species is the type species of its genus as C. percatus. The specific name torvus means "staring eyes", an allusion Gronow did not expand upon but which may refer to the placement of the eyes on the each side at the top of the head.

== Description ==
The smooth horsefish is a compressed fish with a long continuous dorsal fin that is very high over the head and which contains 20 or 21 spines and between 13 and 15 soft rays. The anal fin lacks any pines and has 7 or 8 soft rays. There is a projecting snout with a small, terminal mouth and a single nostril at each side. The adults are smooth skinned but the skin of juveniles is covered with small rough bumps. This species attains a maximum published total length of 76 cm (30 in) but a total length of 30 cm (12 in) is more typical. The juveniles are pale brown in colour broken with irregular darker brown markings, while the adults are plain dark brown.

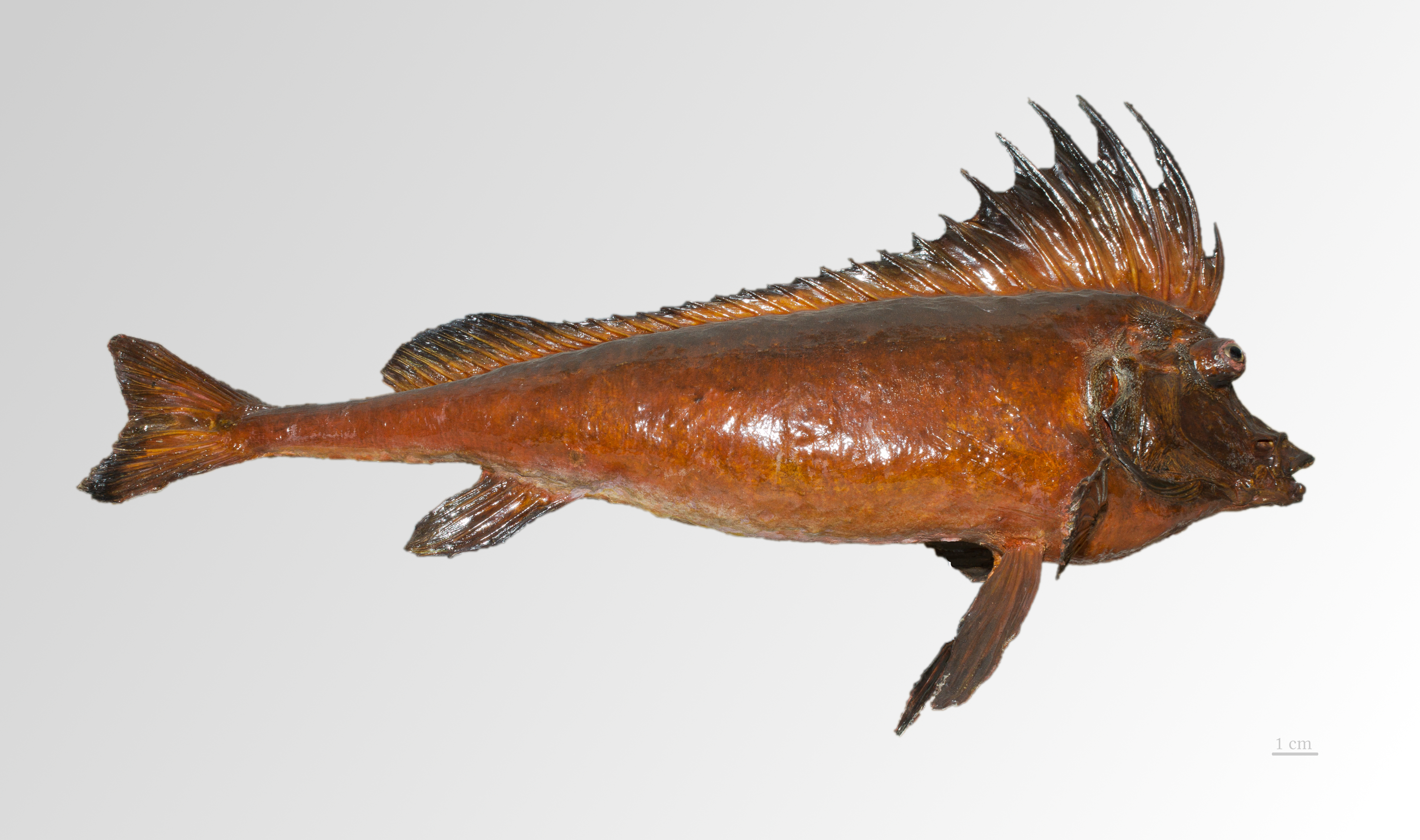

== Distribution and habitat ==
The smooth horsefish is endemic to the temperate waters of southern Africa where it is found from Namibia in the Atlantic Ocean around the Cape of Good Hope to the coast of KwaZulu-Natal in the Indian Ocean. This is a demersal fish which lives at depths of 10 to 146 m (33 to 479 ft) on rocky reefs and sandy seabeds.

== Biology ==
The smooth horsefish is more active during the night than in the day. It feeds on benthic invertebrates such as crustaceans, molluscs, sea urchins, brittle stars and worms. This species is reputed to be rather docile and approachable, even, occasionally, being handled by divers when they have been heard to give off a quiet "tok-tok-tok".

== Fisheries ==
The smooth horsefish has palatable flesh but is not subjected to commercial fisheries and any such fishery would require more information to be gained on the species biology and population before it could be considered. It is taken as bycatch by trawlers and there is evidence that even this has caused signs of overfishing in Namibia.
