= Eric Heath (artist) =

New Zealand artist, illustrator and cartoonist (1923–2025)

- Born: Eric Walmsley Heath; 23 November 1923; Wellington, New Zealand
- Died: 27 July 2025 (aged 101)
- Known for: Cartoons in The Dominion newspaper

Eric Walmsley Heath (23 November 1923 – 27 July 2025) was a New Zealand visual artist, illustrator, and cartoonist.

== Early life and work ==
Heath was born in Wellington and began his professional life working as a filing clerk for The Evening Post. He joined the Royal New Zealand Air Force during World War II and served with the Air Sea Rescue Catalina Squadron in the Solomon Islands.

After his military service, Heath returned to working for The Evening Post, training as a photo engraver. Subsequent to this he worked as a freelance artist. In 1965, Heath had his first cartoon published in The Dominion newspaper. He was the editorial cartoonist for The Dominion from 1964 until 1993 and produced five cartoons a week for 28 years.

Heath also produced illustrations for commissioned or collaborative books covering diverse subject matter.

== Personal life and death ==
Heath married his wife, Barbara, in 1950, and they had three children. In the 1990s, the couple moved from Paremata to Waikanae, and later moved into a retirement village in Paraparaumu. Heath celebrated his 100th birthday in 2023.

Heath participated in scuba diving and helped establish the Wellington Underwater Club in 1951. He also built stage sets for the Plimmerton Little Theatre group and replica bumboats.

Heath died on 27 July 2025, at the age of 101.

== Bibliography ==
- Marine Fishes of New Zealand by Eric Heath and John M. Moreland. Bailey Bros and Swinfen. 1969.
- Marine Fishes of New Zealand: Shoreline and Shallow Seas v. 1 (Mobil New Zealand nature series) by L. Paul and Eric Heath. Raupo Publishing (NZ) Ltd. 1997
- Marine Fishes of New Zealand: Deeper Coastal and Ocean Waters v. 2 (Mobil New Zealand nature series) by L. Paul and Eric Heath. Raupo Publishing (NZ) Ltd. 1997
- Seashore Life (Mobil New Zealand nature series) by Eric Heath and R.K. Dell. Raupo Publishing (NZ) Ltd. 1993
- Classic Steam Locomotives of New Zealand Vol 1 by Bob Stott and Eric Heath. Grantham House Publishing. 1994.
