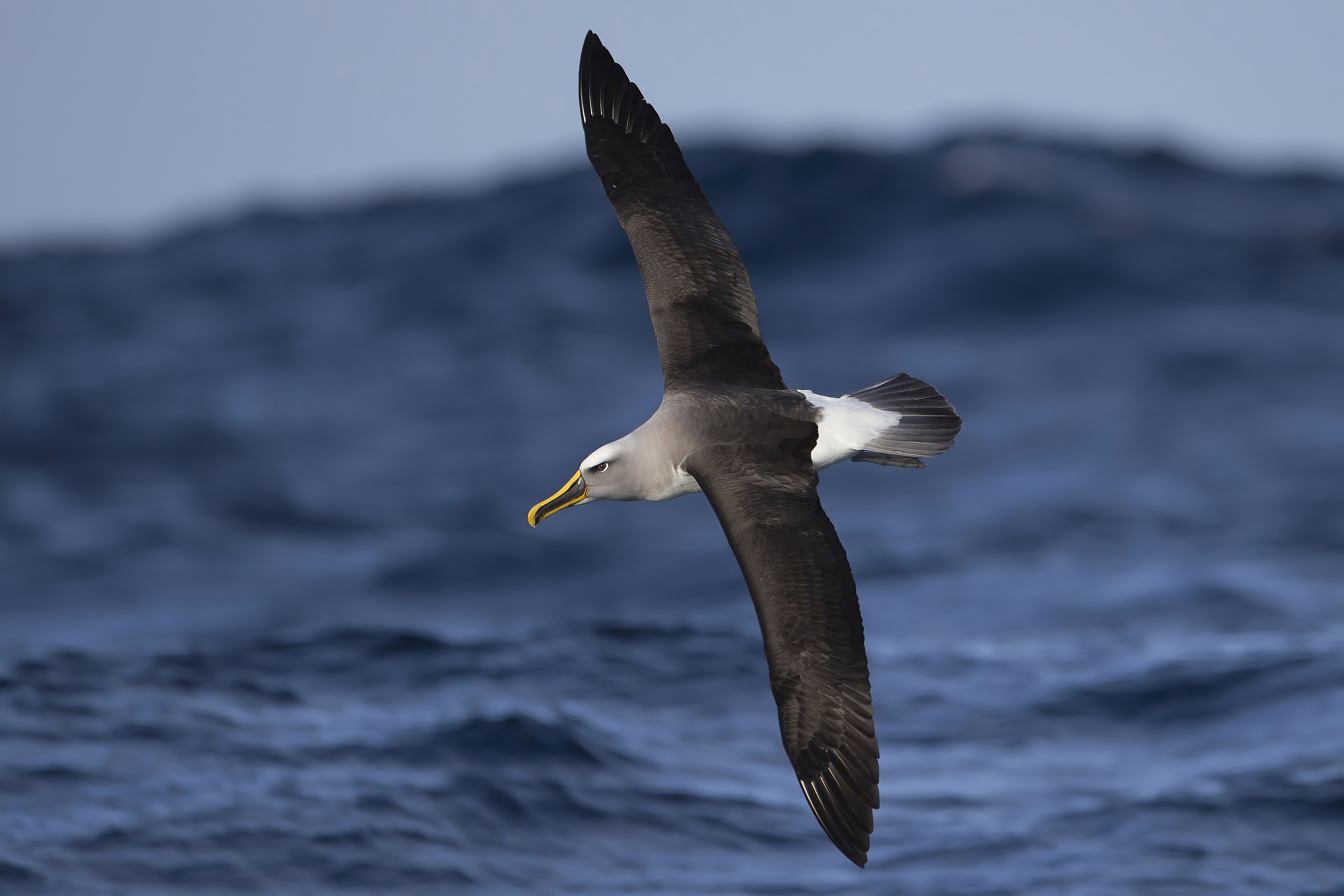

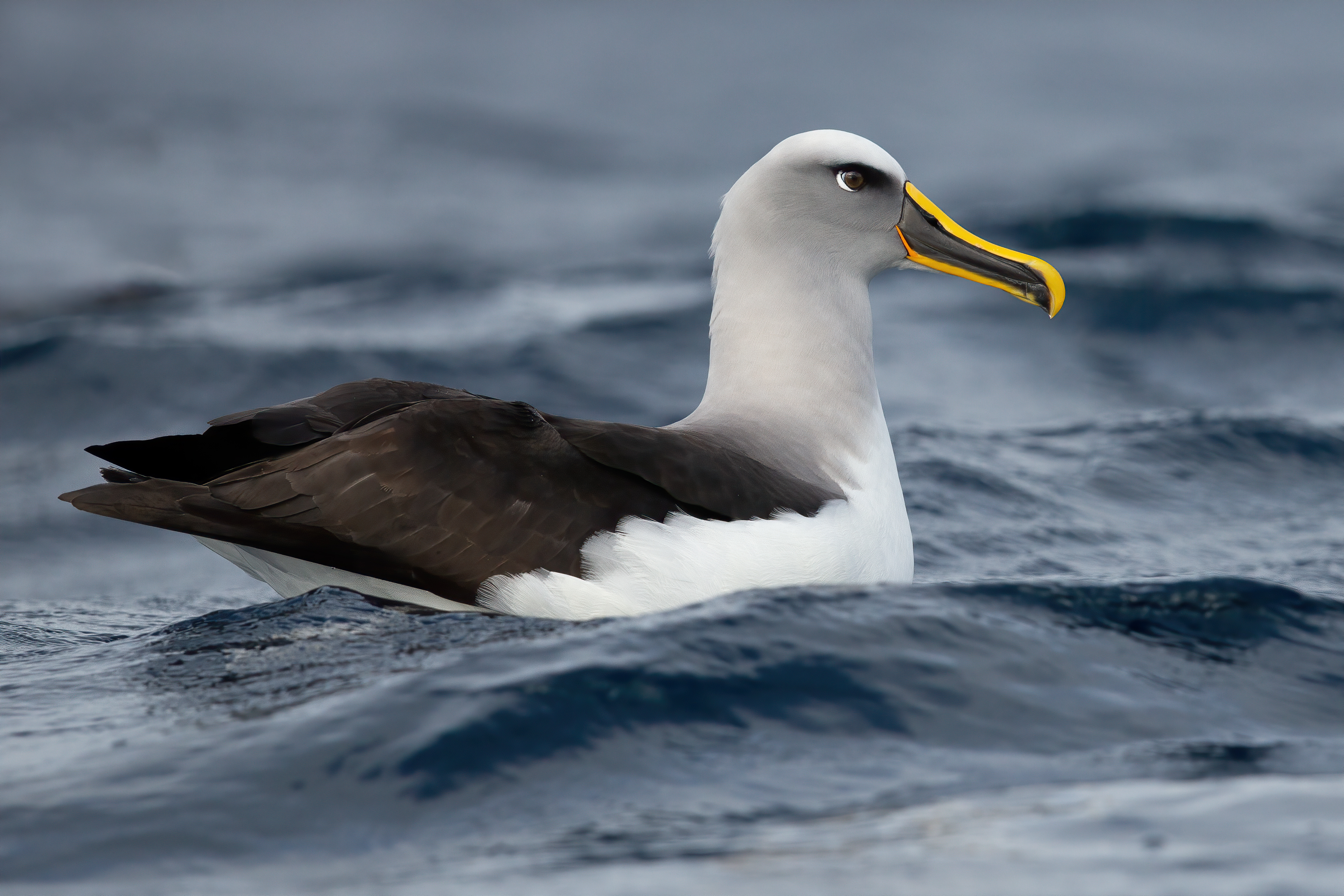

Conservation status
- Near Threatened (IUCN 3.1)

Scientific classification
- Kingdom: Animalia
- Phylum: Chordata
- Class: Aves
- Order: Procellariiformes
- Family: Diomedeidae
- Genus: Thalassarche
- Species: T. bulleri

Binomial name
- Thalassarche bulleri (Rothschild, 1893)

= Buller's albatross =

Species of bird

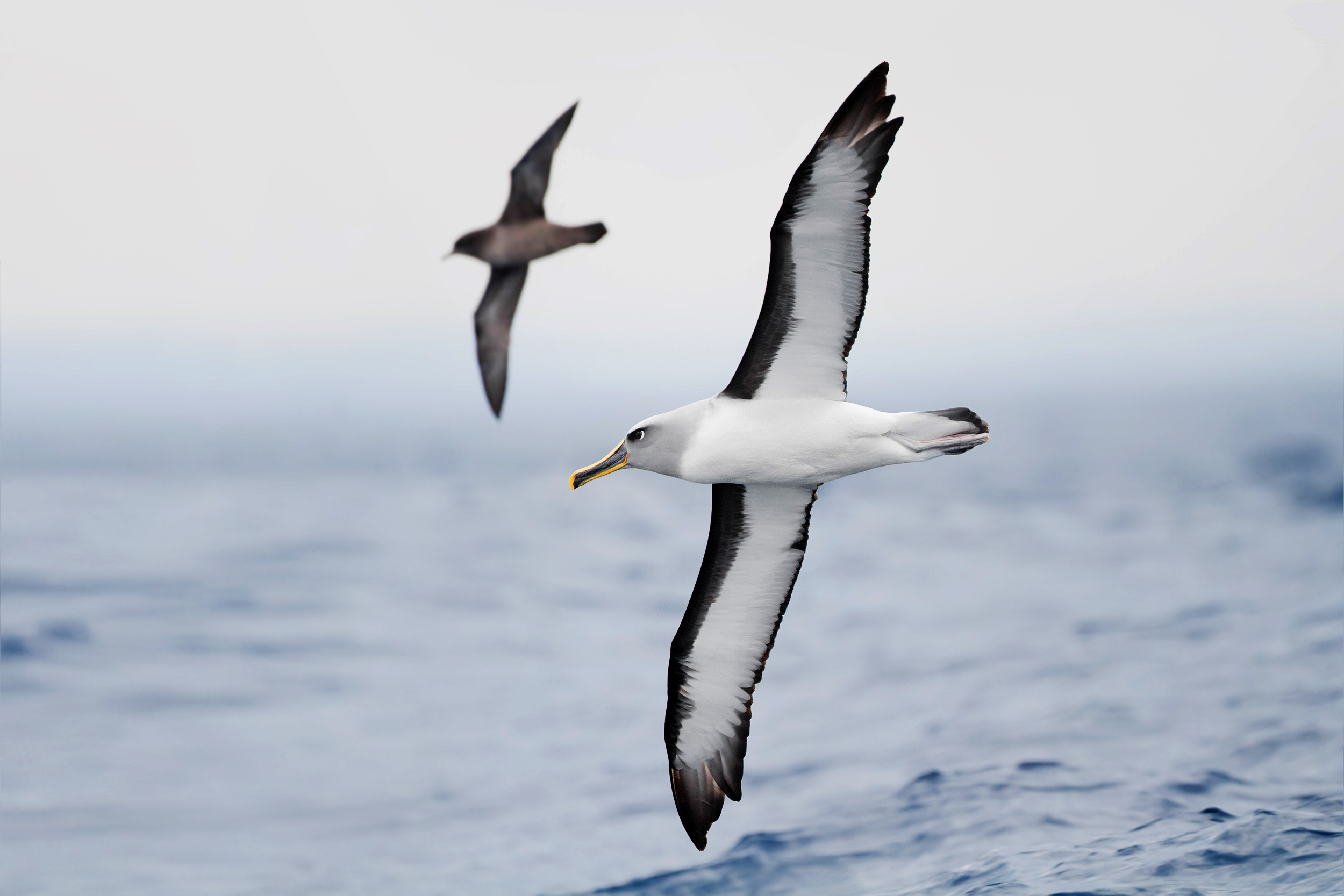
Buller's albatross with a short-tailed shearwater behind, East of the Tasman Peninsula, Tasmania, Australia

Buller's albatross (Thalassarche bulleri) or Buller's mollymawk is a small mollymawk in the albatross family.

It breeds on islands around New Zealand, and feeds in the seas off Australia and the South Pacific.

== Taxonomy ==
Mollymawks are a type of albatross that belong to the family Diomedeidae of the order Procellariiformes, along with shearwaters, fulmars, storm petrels, and diving petrels. They share certain identifying features. First, they have nasal passages called naricorns that attach to the upper bill, although the nostrils on the albatross are on the sides of the bill. The bills of Procellariiformes are also unique in that they are split into seven to nine horny plates. Finally, they produce a stomach oil made up of wax esters and triglycerides that is stored in the proventriculus. This is used against predators as well as an energy rich food source for chicks and for the adults during their long flights. They also have a salt gland that is situated above the nasal passage and helps desalinate their bodies, due to the large amount of ocean water that they imbibe. It excretes a highly saline solution from their nose.

In 1998, C.J.R. Robertson and G. B. Nunn split this species into two, Thalassarche (bulleri) bulleri, and Thalassarche (bulleri) platei, although the majority of authorities including ITIS, James Clements, BirdLife International, and Michael Brooke have not yet accepted this split

== Etymology ==
It was named for the New Zealand ornithologist Walter Buller.

== Description ==
Buller's albatross averages 79 cm (31 in). It has a silver-grey forehead, a grey head and throat. It has a black patch around the eyes with a white crescent behind and below the eye. Its back, upperwing, and tail are dark grey, and its rump and underparts are white. Its underwing is white with a black tip, with a broad sharply demarcated dark band at the leading edge. Its bill is large and black with yellow on the upper mandible, and the tip. The juvenile has a darker head and a brown bill.

== Behaviour ==
=== Reproduction ===
The Buller's albatross is colonial, nesting generally on cliffs, steep coastal terraces, grassy meadows, and tussock covered hills. Birds in the Snares Islands also nest under trees inland. The nest is mound of soil, grass and roots and is set into depressions in the breeding area. Breeding begins in December. Eggs on the Snares are laid in late January (around the 21–23 of January). incubation lasts around 60 days, with both parents sharing the responsibility. The average incubation shift is around 10 days. After hatching it takes 170 days to fledge the chick. They breed annually.

=== Feeding ===
Buller's albatross feeds on squid, fish, tunicates, octopus, and crustacea.

== Range and habitat ==
Breeding population and trends
Location	Population	Date	Trend
Snares Island	8,877 pairs	1999	Increasing
Solander Islands	4,912 pairs	1999	Increasing
Forty-Fours	16,000 pairs	1998	
Big Sister Island & Little Sister Island	2,130 pairs	1998	
Rosemary Rock	20 pairs	1998	
Total	64,000	1999	Stable

Buller's albatross is endemic to New Zealand. They breed on Snares Islands, Solander Island, Chatham Islands (Big and Little Sister and Forty-fours Island), and Three Kings Islands (Rosemary Rock). Adults forage between 40°S and 50°S from Tasmania to the Chatham Rise. Juveniles and adults that aren't breeding disperse across the South Pacific with a number feeding every year in the Humboldt Current off Chile and Peru.

== Conservation ==
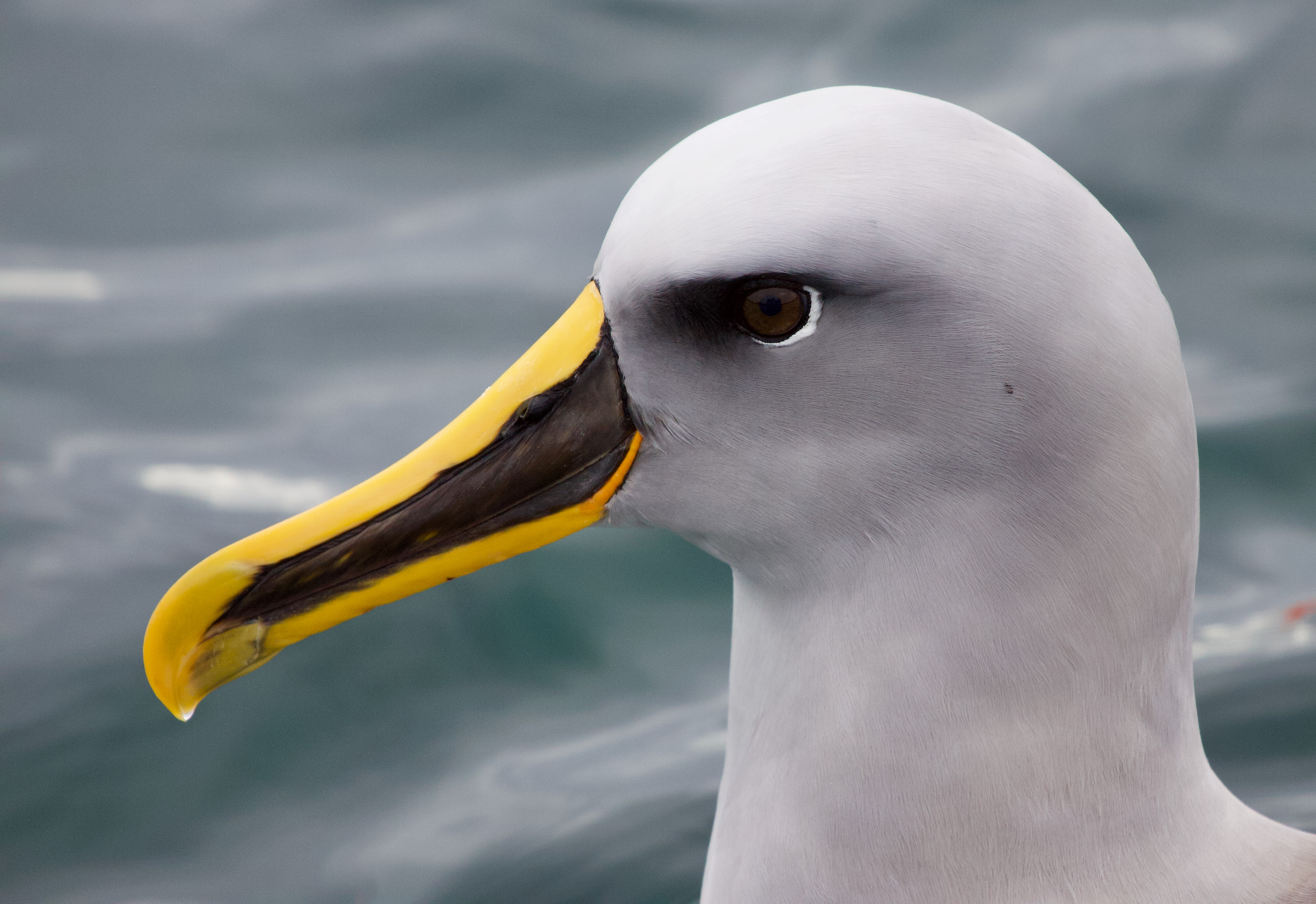
Buller's albatross (Thalassarche bulleri). Note the two parasites just under the feathers.

It was formerly classified as a vulnerable species by the IUCN. But new research has shown it to be not as rare as it was believed. Consequently, it was downlisted to near threatened status in 2008. It has an occurrence range of 16,100,000 km^{2} (6,200,000 sq mi) and a breeding range of 4 km^{2} (1.5 sq mi). According to a 1999 estimate, there are 64,000 birds and there are 31,939 breeding adults. These are located as follows: 8,877 pairs on the Snares Islands, 4,912 pairs on Solander Island, 16,000 pairs on Forty-fours Island, 2,130 pairs on Big and Little Sister, 20 pairs on Rosemary Rock in the Three Kings group.

The Snares Islands population has been increasing, but lately not as much as in the 1970s, whereas the Solander Island population which was stable from 1985 to 1996 has now shown about an 18% increase. The survival rate of adults on the Snares Islands increased to 95.5% and brooding success rate was 70.8%, whereas on Big and Little Sister, adult survival rate is 93.5% and the brooding success rate is between 57–60%.

Buller's albatross is the most common bycatch from longline fisheries out of New Zealand, and, even though net-sonde cables were banned in 1992, squid trawlers still catch them. Finally, weka Gallirallus australis was introduced to Big Sister and may take eggs and chicks. Most islands are legally protected, except for the Chatham Islands colonies which are on private land.
