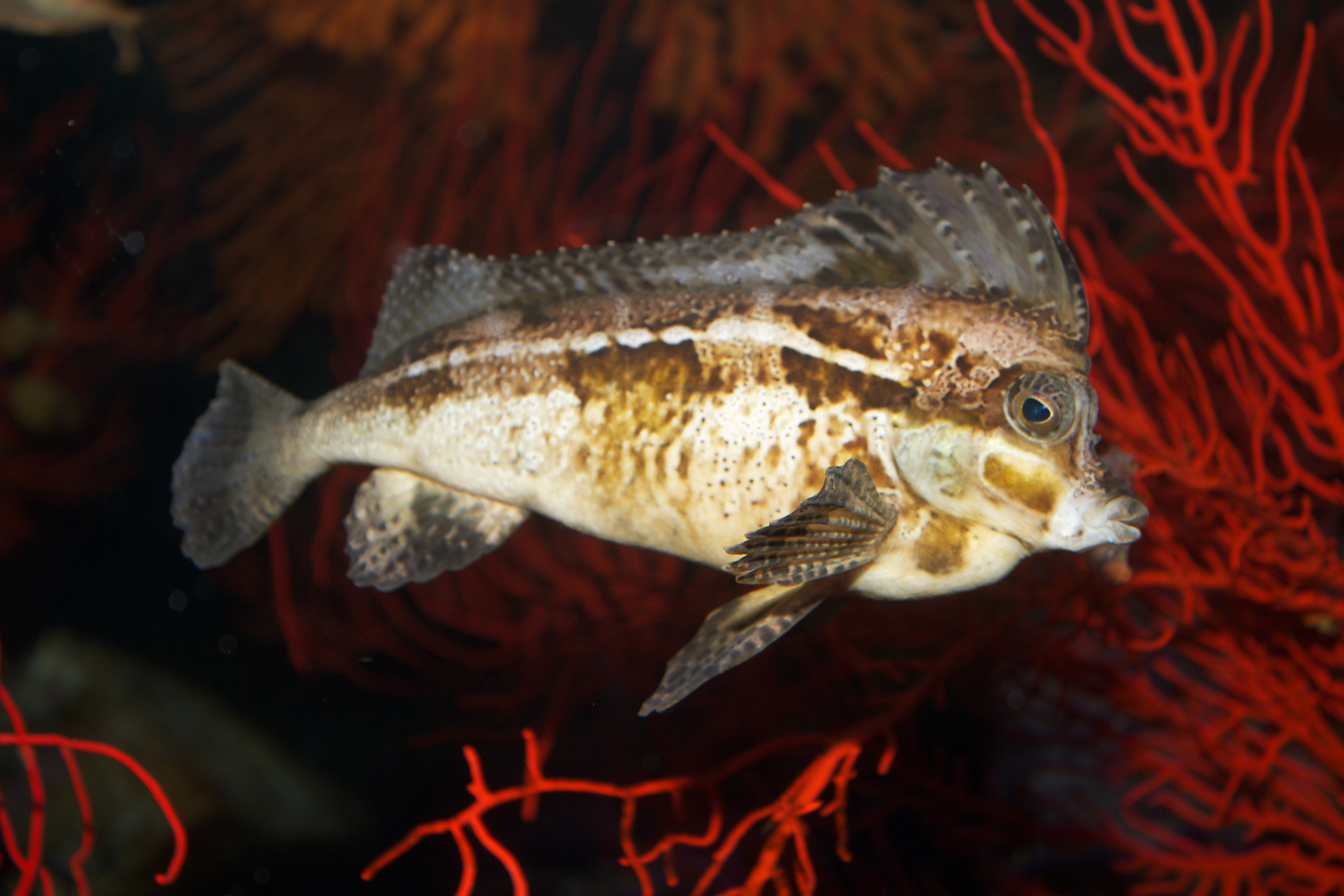
- Spinenose horsefish (C. spinifer)
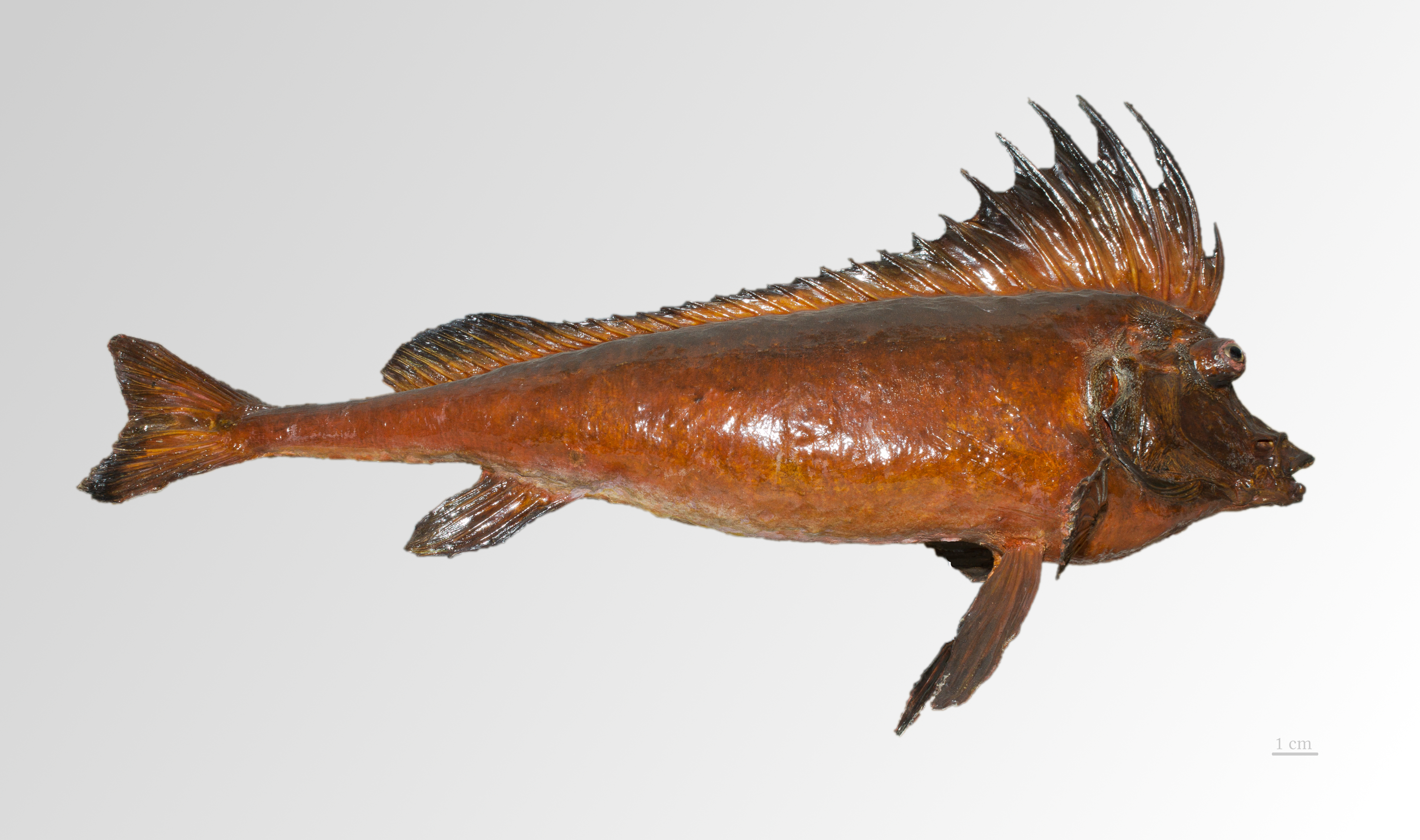
- Smooth horsefish (C. torvus)

Scientific classification
- Kingdom: Animalia
- Phylum: Chordata
- Class: Actinopterygii
- Order: Perciformes
- Suborder: Scorpaenoidei
- Family: Congiopodidae; Gill, 1889
- Genus: Congiopodus; Perry, 1811

Type species
- Congiopodus percatus, a synonym of Blennius torvus Perry, 1811

= Congiopodus =

Genus of fishes

Congiopodus, commonly known as pigfishes, horsefishes and racehorses, is a genus of marine ray-finned fishes, the only genus in the family Congiopodidae. These fishes are found in the southern Atlantic and Pacific oceans.

== Taxonomy ==
Congiopodus was first formally described as a genus in 1811 by the English naturalist George Perry when he described Congiopodus percatus, the type species by monotypy. Subsequently, Perry's species was shown to be a junior synonym of Blennius torvus which had been described by the Dutch zoologist Laurens Theodorus Gronow in 1772, with an erroneous type locality of the Indian Ocean given for this southern African species.

The genus is the type genus of the family Congiopodidae. In the past, three other genera (Perryena, Alertichthys, and Zanclorhynchus) were classified in this family, but more recent authorities have found such a placement to be paraphyletic and regard this family as monogeneric. The family is placed in the suborder Scorpaenoidei which in turn is classified within the order Scorpaeniformes in that book, but more recent authorities classify Scorpaenoidei within the Perciformes.

The name of the genus was not explained by Perry but may be a combination of the Greek gongulos, meaning "round", and podus, which means "foot", maybe referring to the roundish pelvic fins of C. percatus.

== Species ==
There are currently six recognised species in this genus:

- Congiopodus coriaceus Paulin & Moreland, 1979 (Deepsea pigfish)
- Congiopodus kieneri (Sauvage, 1878)
- Congiopodus leucopaecilus (J. Richardson, 1846) (Southern pigfish)
- Congiopodus peruvianus (G. Cuvier, 1829) (Horsefish)
- Congiopodus spinifer (A. Smith, 1839) (Spinenose horsefish)
- Congiopodus torvus (Gronow, 1772) (Smooth horsefish)

== Characteristics ==
Congiopodus pigfishes have a compressed body with a prominent snout, a terminal mouth and a single nostril on each side. It has small gill openings over the pectoral fins. They sometimes have no scales and, if they are present, they are tiny and spiny. The pelvic and pectoral fins have narrow bases and few unbranched fin rays. There are no sharp spines in the anal fin while the dorsal fin has between 14 and 21 spines and 11 and 14 soft rays. These are medium sized fishes with the largest species being C. torvus which has a maximum published total length of 76 cm (30 in).

== Distribution and habitat ==
Congiopodus pigfishes are found in the southern Pacific and southern Atlantic Oceans. They are demersal fishes with some species in shallow coastal waters and others living in deeper waters.

== Biology ==
One Congiopodid, Congiopodus peruvianus, is found in the shallow South American waters. In this species the adult's dorsal fin is relatively shorter than the juvenile's fin, but they all resemble yellow and orange dead tree leaves.
