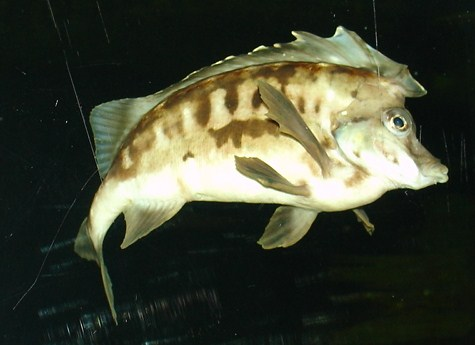

Scientific classification
- Kingdom: Animalia
- Phylum: Chordata
- Class: Actinopterygii
- Order: Perciformes
- Family: Congiopodidae
- Genus: Congiopodus
- Species: C. leucopaecilus

Binomial name
- Congiopodus leucopaecilus (J. Richardson, 1846)

Synonyms
- Agriopus leucopaecilus Richardson, 1846

= Southern pigfish =

Species of fish

The southern pigfish (Congiopodus leucopaecilus) is a species of marine ray-finned fish belonging to the family Congiopodidae, the horsefishes or pigfishes. It is found in the waters off southern Australia and New Zealand.

== Taxonomy ==
The Southern pigfish was first formally described in 1846 as Agriopus leucopaecilus by the Scottish naval surgeon, naturalist and Arctic explorer John Richardson with the type locality given as "South Australian seas", although this was probably New Zealand. The specific name combines leuco, meaning "white", and poecilius, meaning "mottled", an allusion to the purplish-white spots and blotches on the body of this fish.

== Description ==
The southern pigfish has smooth skin and no spines in the anal fin. The profile of the head is nearly vertical between the eye and the origin of the dorsal fin. The overall colour of the body is brownish above and cream below marked with a row of pale and dark blotches along the flanks while the remainder of the body is blotched. The maximum published total length for this species is 35 cm (14 in), although a total length of 20 cm (7.9 in) is more typical.

== Distribution and habitat ==
The Southern pigfish is found in the southwestern Pacific Ocean. It is known to occur in the waters off New Zealand, where it is rare north of the Cook Strait, and has been reported from southern Australia but there are no specimens collected in Australian waters in Australian museums. This is a demersal fish which occurs over the continental shelf at depths between 22 and 222 m (72 and 728 ft), although it is cot typically found deeper than 100 m (330 ft).

== Biology ==
The Southern pigfish is a sedentary species which swims slowly and rests on the substrate for long periods. The long snout is used to probe in crevices, seaweed and sand to find the crabs, worms, and other benthic invertebrates that this species feeds on.
