= John Munne Moreland =

New Zealand marine biologist and ichthyologist

John "Jock" Munne Moreland (b 11 January 1921 Wanganui d. June 2012) was a New Zealand marine biologist and ichthyologist who worked at the Dominion Museum, later the Museum of New Zealand Te Papa Tongarewa, in Wellington.

== Career ==
He was brought up and attended school in Wanganui before joining the 3rd Division (New Zealand) serving in the Pacific Theatre during and the 2nd Division (New Zealand) during World War 2. After demobilising he joined the staff of the Dominion Museum. He graduated with a Bachelor's degree in Biology from the Victoria University of Wellington in 1958.

He was appointed as an Assistant Zoologist, with Charles McCann, who was the only vertebrate Zoologist at the museum at the time. McCann's interest was in marine mammals so he tasked Moreland with curating the collection of seabirds. This resulted in him becoming responsible for the New Zealand Bird Banding Scheme, which the museum oversaw. This work resulted in the publication of A guide to the larger oceanic birds (albatrosses and giant petrel) of New Zealand waters. Also in the 1950s Moreland began to study fish. He was a member of the 1954 Chatham Islands Expedition. He curated the fish collection between 1949 until his retirement in 1981, developing it into a major collection of specimens which became the National Fish Collection of New Zealand.

== Publications ==
Moreland wrote no less than 12 research papers and his output included the following books:

- New Zealand Sea Anglers' Guide1960 (with R.B. Doogue and E. Heath)
- Native Sea Fishes 1963
- Marine Fishes 1965
- Marine Fishes of New Zealand 1967 (with E. Heath)
- Handbook of New Zealand Marine Fishes 1993 (with L.J. Paul)

== Legacy ==
Moreland described 2 fish species the Alert pigfish (Alertichthys blacki) and Congiopodus coriaceus. He had 3 fish species named in his honour, the New Zealand urchin clingfish (Dellichthys morelandi) and the duckbills Hemerocoetes morelandi and the New Zealand flathead (Bembrops morelandi), as well as 3 species of invertebrate.
